= List of the Paleozoic life of Alaska =

This list of the Paleozoic life of Alaska contains the various prehistoric life-forms whose fossilized remains have been reported from within the US state of Alaska and are between 538.8 and 252.17 million years of age.

== A ==
- †Abadehella
- †Acanthocladia
- †Acanthopecten
  - †Acanthopecten carbonifer – or unidentified related form
  - †Acanthopecten delawarensis – or unidentified related form
- †Acanthophyllum
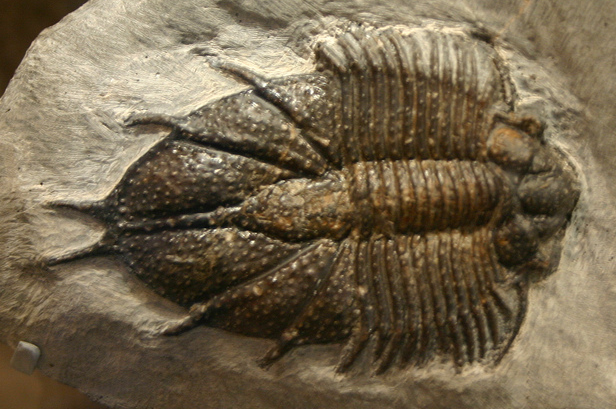
- Fossil of the Silurian-Middle Devonian trilobite Acanthopyge
  †Acanthopyge
- †Acervularia
- †Aclisina – tentative report
- †Acmarhachis
  - †Acmarhachis acutus
- †Acrosaccus
  - †Acrosaccus shuleri – or unidentified comparable form
- †Acrothele
- †Actinocystis – tentative report
  - †Actinocystis perfecta – or unidentified comparable form
- †Actinostroma
- †Adolfispirifer
  - †Adolfispirifer sanjuanensis
- †Afilasma
- †Agathammina
- †Agetolites
- †Aglaoglypta
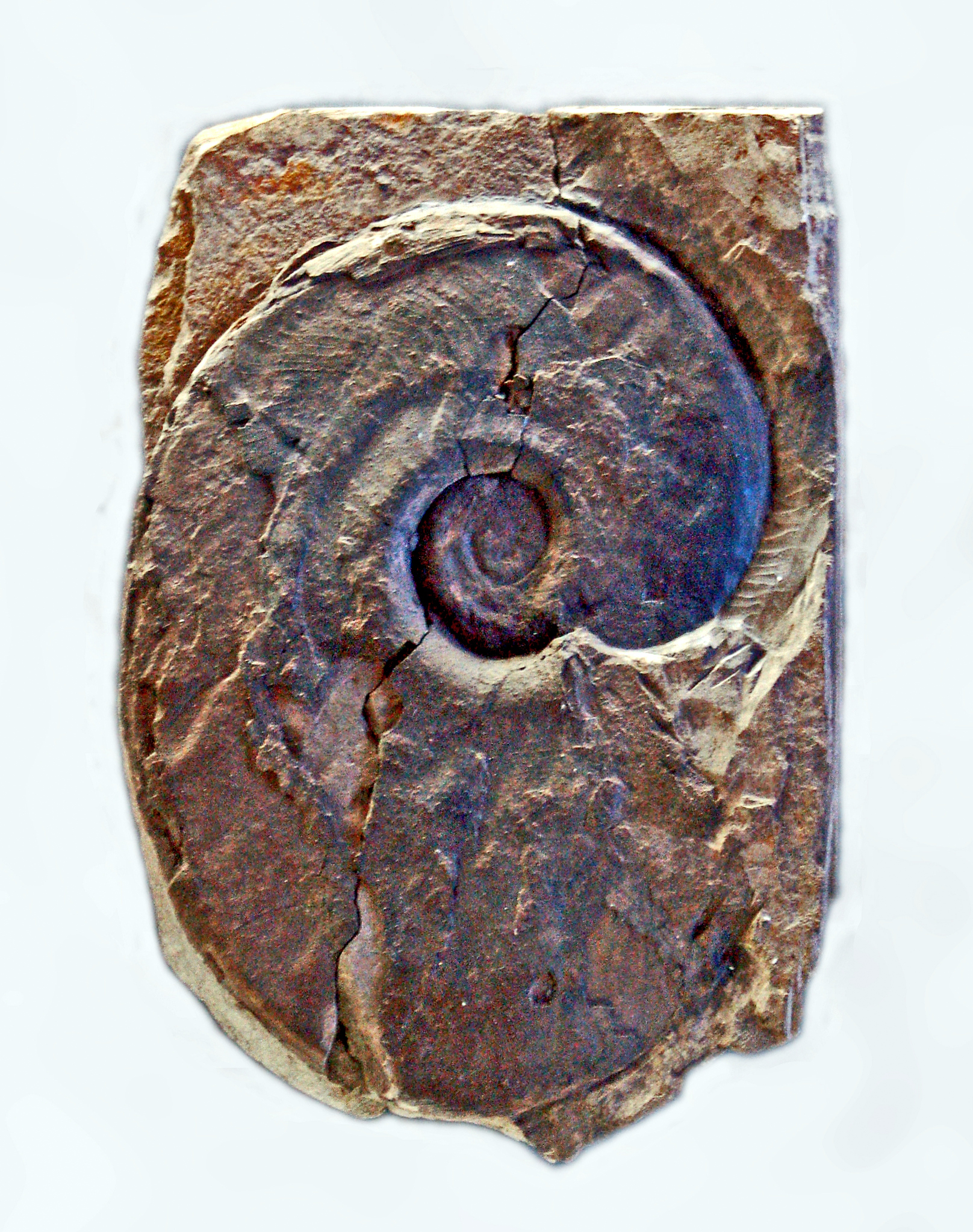
- Fossilized shell of the Middle Devonian ammonoid cephalopod, Agoniatites
  †Agoniatites – tentative report
- †Akidograptus
  - †Akidograptus acuminatus
- †Alaskacirrus – type locality for genus
  - †Alaskacirrus bandeli – type locality for species
- †Alaskaspongia
  - †Alaskaspongia nana
- †Alaskaspongiella – type locality for genus
  - †Alaskaspongiella laminosa – type locality for species
- †Alaskiella – type locality for genus
  - †Alaskiella medfraensis – type locality for species
- †Alaskodiscus
  - †Alaskodiscus donensis
- †Alaskospira
  - †Alaskospira dunbari
- †Alaskozygopleura
  - †Alaskozygopleura crassicostata
- †Albaillella
  - †Albaillella cartalla – or unidentified related form
- †Aldanispirifer
- †Allonema
  - †Allonema silurica
- †Allorhynchoides – type locality for genus
  - †Allorhynchoides kirki – type locality for species
- †Alokistocare – or unidentified comparable form
  - †Alokistocare lobatum
- †Alveolitella
- †Alveolites
- †Amblysiphonella
- †Ambocoelia
  - †Ambocoelia planiconvexa – or unidentified related form
  - †Ambocoelia umbonata
- †Amoenospirifer
  - †Amoenospirifer angustiplicata
  - †Amoenospirifer sulcalplicata
- †Amphipora
- †Amplexograptus
  - †Amplexograptus confertus – or unidentified comparable form
  - †Amplexograptus perexcavatus – or unidentified comparable form
- †Amplexoides
- †Amplexus
- †Anatrypa
  - †Anatrypa alinensis – or unidentified related form
  - †Anatrypa khavae – or unidentified comparable form
- †Ancillotoechia
  - †Ancillotoechia antiquaria
- †Ancyrognathus
  - †Ancyrognathus amana – or unidentified comparable form
- †Anematina
  - †Anematina rockymontanum
- †Anemonaria
  - †Anemonaria pseudohorrida
- †Angullongia
  - †Angullongia minuta
- †Anidanthus
- †Anisopleurella
  - †Anisopleurella tricostata – type locality for species
- †Anisotrypa – tentative report
- †Anomalograptus
- †Anomphalus – tentative report
- †Anopolenus
  - †Anopolenus henrici
- †Anoptambonites
  - †Anoptambonites grayae
  - †Anoptambonites pulchra
- †Antherosalpinx
- †Anthraconeilo – tentative report
- †Aparchitella – tentative report
- †Aphelognathus
  - †Aphelognathus divergens – or unidentified related form
- †Apheoorthis
- †Aphrosalpinx
  - †Aphrosalpinx nana – type locality for species
  - †Aphrosalpinx textilis
- †Aphyllum
- †Archaediscus
- †Archeocidaris – tentative report
- †Arctitreta
  - †Arctitreta kempei – or unidentified comparable form
- †Arctozone – type locality for genus
  - †Arctozone cooki – type locality for species
- †Arjamannia
  - †Arjamannia thraivensis – or unidentified related form
- †Aseptirhynchia
  - †Aseptirhynchia glabrata
- †Asgardaspira
  - †Asgardaspira gerulus – type locality for species
- †Astralites
  - †Astralites gamblei – type locality for species
- †Athabaskiella
  - †Athabaskiella ardis – type locality for species
- †Athyris
  - †Athyris lamellosa – or unidentified related form
- †Atomodesma – tentative report
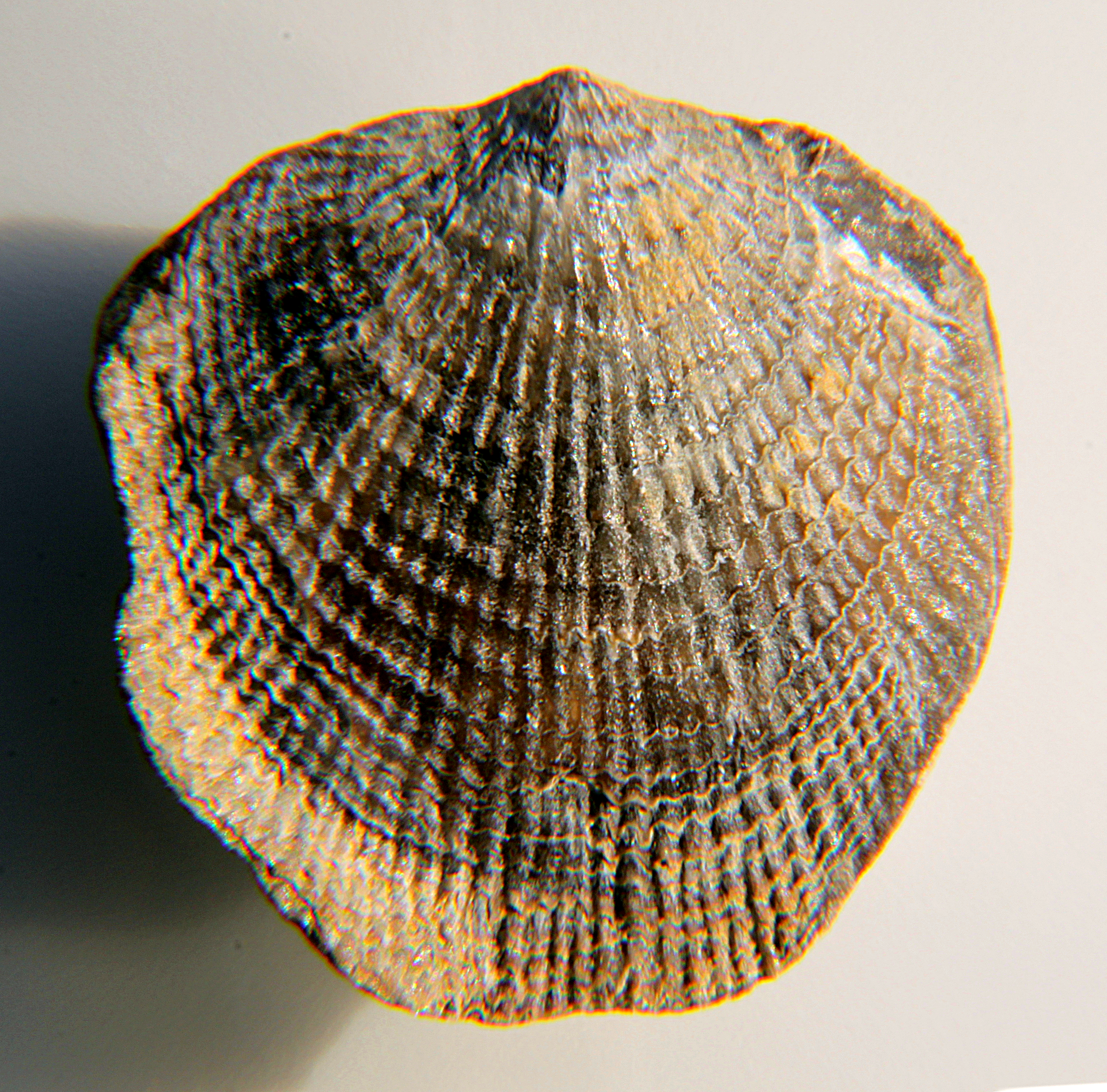
- Fossilized shell of the Late Ordovician-Carboniferous brachiopod Atrypa
  †Atrypa
  - †Atrypa hystrix
  - †Atrypa reticularis
- †Atrypella
  - †Atrypella borealis
  - †Atrypella scheii
  - †Atrypella tenuis
- †Atrypoidea
  - †Atrypoidea scheii
- †Attenuatella
- †Aulocystis
- †Aulopora
- †Australonema
- †Australophyllum
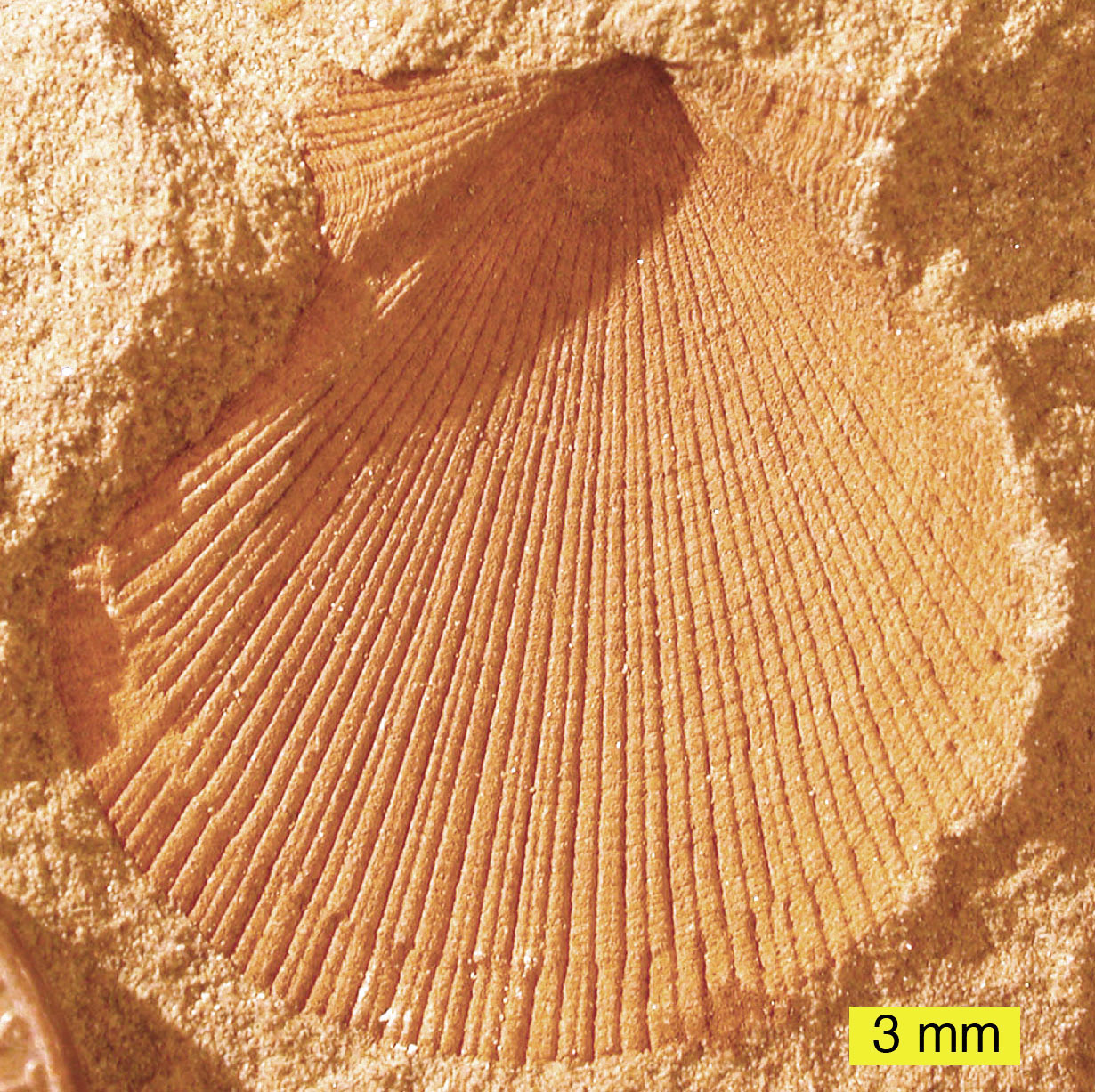
- Mold fossil of a shell of the Early Devonian-Late Triassic bivalve Aviculopecten
  †Aviculopecten
  - †Aviculopecten chesterensis – tentative report
  - †Aviculopecten delawarensis – or unidentified related form
  - †Aviculopecten edwardsi – or unidentified related form
  - †Aviculopecten fasciculatus – or unidentified related form
  - †Aviculopecten hardinensis – or unidentified related form
  - †Aviculopecten mccoyi – or unidentified related form
  - †Aviculopecten montpelierensis – or unidentified related form
  - †Aviculopecten occidentalis – or unidentified related form
  - †Aviculopecten similis – or unidentified related form
- † Avonia – tentative report

== B ==
- †Bailiaspis
  - †Bailiaspis picta
- Bairdia
- †Balbinipleura
  - †Balbinipleura krawczynskii – type locality for species
- †Barocospira
  - †Barocospira cindiprellerae – type locality for species
- †Bathyuriscidella
  - †Bathyuriscidella socialis
- †Bathyuriscus
  - †Bathyuriscus punctatus – type locality for species
- †Batostomella
- †Belemnites – tentative report
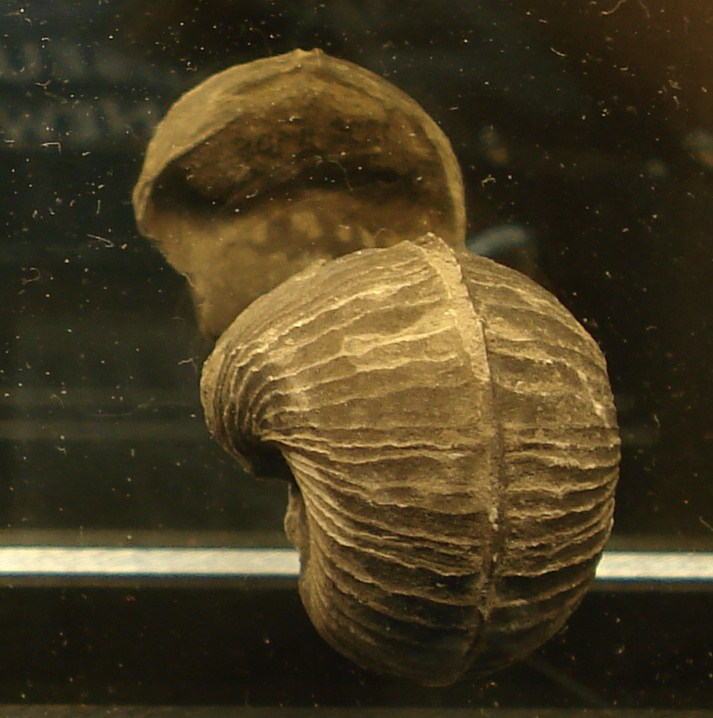
- Fossilized shell of the Silurian-Early Triassic mollusc Bellerophon
  †Bellerophon
  - †Bellerophon chapmani
  - †Bellerophon livengoodensis
  - †Bellerophon spergensis – or unidentified related form
- †Belodina
- †Belowea
  - †Belowea variabilis
- †Bembexia – tentative report
  - †Bembexia inumbilicata – type locality for species
- †Bensbergia
  - †Bensbergia subcostata – or unidentified related form
- †Beraunia
  - †Beraunia bifrons
  - †Beraunia bohemica
- †Betaneospirifer
  - †Betaneospirifer marcoui – or unidentified related form
- †Beyrichia
  - †Beyrichia churkini
- †Bicarinatina
  - †Bicarinatina kongakutensis – type locality for species
- †Bighornia
- †Bimuria
  - †Bimuria gilbertella
- †Blasispirifer
  - †Blasispirifer blasii – or unidentified related form
- †Bohemicardia
  - †Bohemicardia bohemica – or unidentified comparable form
- †Bolaspidella
  - †Bolaspidella wellsvillensis
- †Bothrodendron
  - †Bothrodendron kiltorkense
- †Boucotspira
  - †Boucotspira carinifer
- †Brachylasma – tentative report
- †Brachymetopus
  - †Brachymetopus pseudometopina
- †Brachyprion
- †Brachythyrina
  - †Brachythyrina rectangula – or unidentified related form
- †Brachythyris
  - †Brachythyris subcardiformis – or unidentified related form
  - †Brachythyris subcardiiformis – or unidentified related form
  - †Brachythyris suborbicularis – or unidentified related form
  - †Brachythyris ufensis – or unidentified related form
- †Breviphyllum
  - †Breviphyllum lindstromi – or unidentified comparable form
- †Briscoia – tentative report
- †Bronteus
- †Brooksina
  - †Brooksina alaskensis
- †Bruntonia
  - †Bruntonia granulifera
- †Bucanopsis
  - †Bucanopsis volgulica – or unidentified related form
- †Buechelia
  - †Buechelia nodosa
- †Bulimorpha
- †Bulimorphia
  - †Bulimorphia peracuta – or unidentified related form
- †Buthrotrephis – tentative report

== C ==
- †Calapoecia
- †Calceola
  - †Calceola sandalina – or unidentified comparable form
- †Callaiapsida
  - †Callaiapsida arctica
  - †Callaiapsida kekuensis – type locality for species
  - †Callaiapsida pentameroides – or unidentified related form
- †Calliprotonia – tentative report
- †Callistadia
- †Callograptus
- †Callositella – type locality for genus
  - †Callositella cheeneetnukensis – type locality for species
- †Callospiriferina
  - †Callospiriferina pinguis
- †Calymene
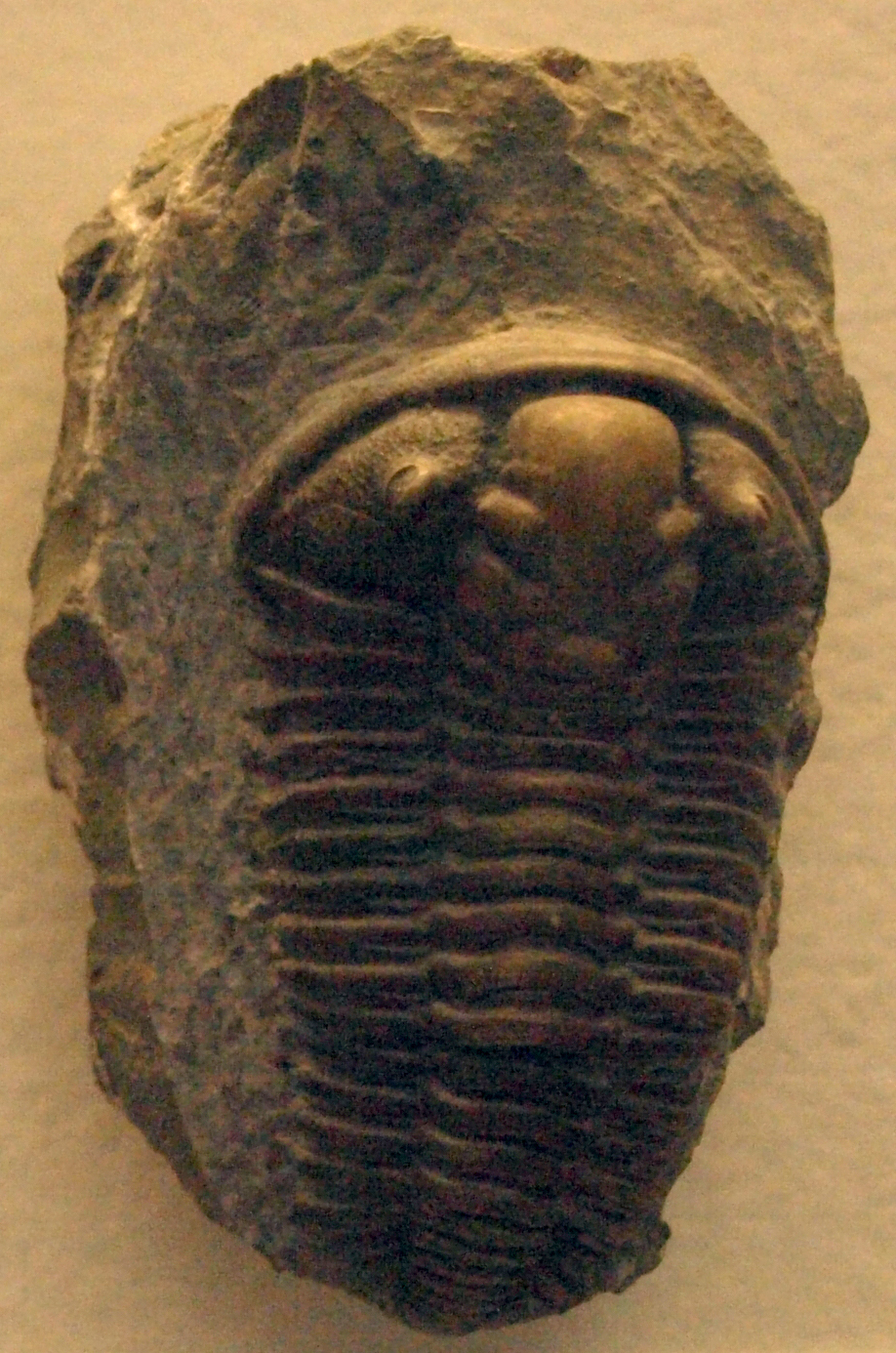
  - Fossil of the Silurian trilobite Calymene blumenbachii
    †Calymene blumenbachii
  - †Calymene iladon
- †Camarotoechia
  - †Camarotoechia billingsi – or unidentified comparable form
  - †Camarotoechia duplicata – tentative report
  - †Camarotoechia winiskensis – or unidentified comparable form
- †Campophyllum – tentative report
- †Cancrinella
  - †Cancrinella cancrini – or unidentified related form
  - †Cancrinella cancriniformis – or unidentified related form
  - †Cancrinella koninckiana – or unidentified related form
  - †Cancrinella tenuissima
- †Caneyella – tentative report
- †Capellinia
- Capulus
- †Cardiomorpha – tentative report
- †Carinatina
- †Caruthia – type locality for genus
  - †Caruthia borealis – type locality for species
- †Caryocaris
- †Catazyga
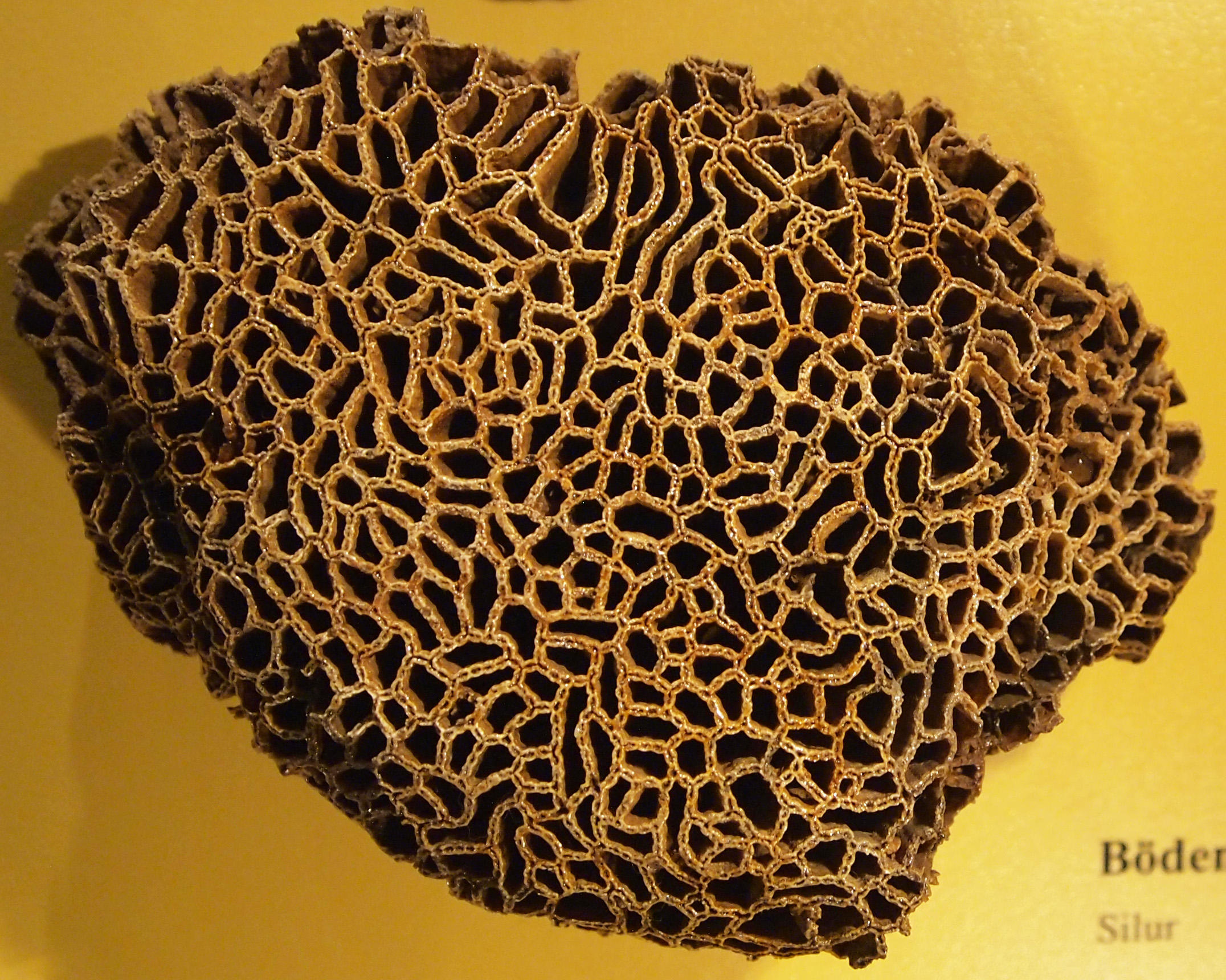
- Fossil of the Ordovician-Silurian tabulate coral Catenipora
  †Catenipora
  - †Catenipora jacovikii – or unidentified comparable form
  - †Catenipora robustus – or unidentified comparable form
  - †Catenipora rubra – or unidentified comparable form
- †Cedaria
- †Centronella
  - †Centronella navicella – or unidentified comparable form
- †Ceratiacaris
- †Ceratopea
  - †Ceratopea medfraensis – type locality for species
- †Cernuolimbus
  - †Cernuolimbus longifrons
- †Chaetetes
  - †Chaetetes milleporaceous
- †Chaetetipora
  - †Chaetetipora ellesmerensis – or unidentified comparable form
- †Chaoiella
  - †Chaoiella gruenewaldti – or unidentified related form
- †Chapinella – type locality for genus
  - †Chapinella bucareliensis – type locality for species
- †Charactophyllum
- †Cheeneetnukia – type locality for genus
  - †Cheeneetnukia frydai – type locality for species
- †Cheilocephalus
  - †Cheilocephalus expansus – type locality for species
- †Cheiropyge
  - †Cheiropyge himalayensis
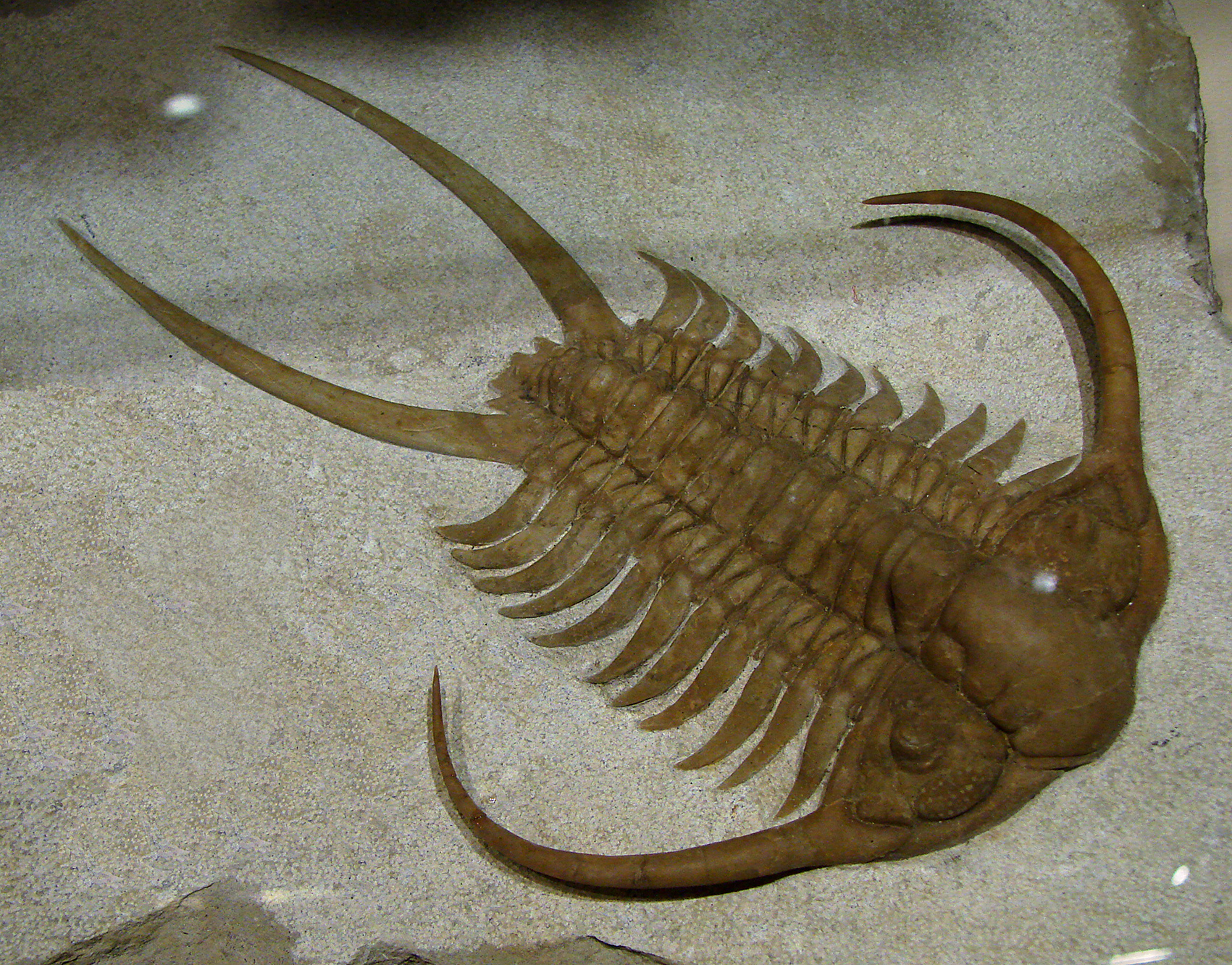
- Fossil of the Cambrian-Middle Devonian trilobite Cheirurus
  †Cheirurus
- †Chirognathus – tentative report
- †Chlupacispira – type locality for genus
  - †Chlupacispira spinosa – type locality for species
- †Chonetes
  - †Chonetes capax – or unidentified related form
  - †Chonetes illinoisensis – or unidentified related form
  - †Chonetes manitobensis – or unidentified comparable form
  - †Chonetes timanicus – or unidentified related form
  - †Chonetes verneuile – or unidentified comparable form
  - †Chonetes verneuilianus – or unidentified related form
- †Chonetina – report made of unidentified related form or using admittedly obsolete nomenclature
- †Chonetinella
- †Chonetipustula
  - †Chonetipustula concentrica
- †Chonetoidea – or unidentified related form
- †Chonophyllum
- †Choristites
- †Christiania
  - †Christiania aseptata – type locality for species
- †Chusenella
  - †Chusenella atlinensis – or unidentified loosely related form
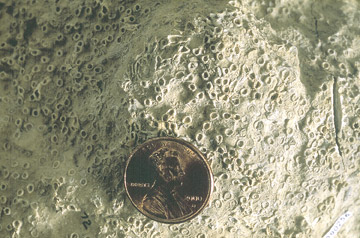
- Fossil of the Carboniferous tabulate coral Cladochonus
  †Cladochonus
- †Cladopora
- †Cladospongia – type locality for genus
  - †Cladospongia alaskensis – type locality for species
- †Clathronema
  - †Clathronema cingulata
  - †Clathronema cloughi
- †Cleiothyridina
  - †Cleiothyridina milleri – type locality for species
  - †Cleiothyridina sublamellosa – or unidentified related form
- †Cleiothyris
  - †Cleiothyris suborbiculoides – or unidentified related form
- †Cliefdenella
  - †Cliefdenella alaskaensis
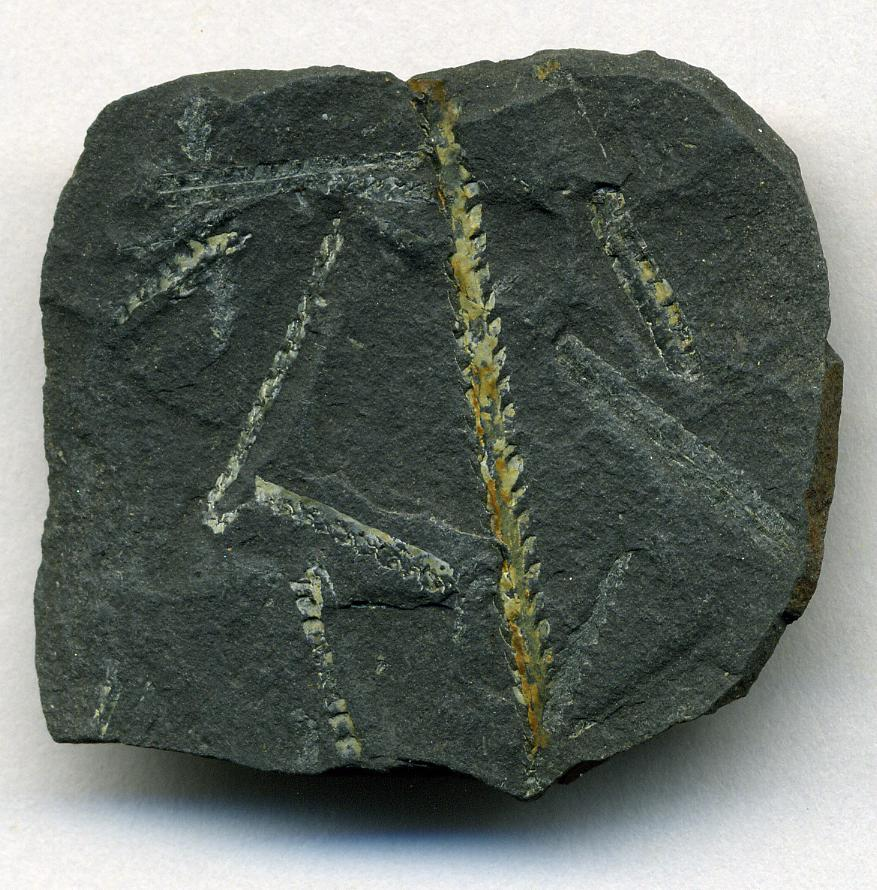
- Assemblage of fossils of the Cambrian graptolite Climacograptus
  †Climacograptus
  - †Climacograptus antiquus – or unidentified related form
  - †Climacograptus bicornis
  - †Climacograptus eximius – or unidentified comparable form
  - †Climacograptus hughesi – or unidentified comparable form
  - †Climacograptus indivisus
  - †Climacograptus innotatus
  - †Climacograptus medius
  - †Climacograptus minutus – tentative report
  - †Climacograptus phyllophorus – or unidentified comparable form
  - †Climacograptus pungens
  - †Climacograptus rectangularis
  - †Climacograptus scalaris
  - †Climacograptus stenotelus
  - †Climacograptus trifilis
- †Cliothyridina
  - †Cliothyridina incrassata – or unidentified related form
  - †Cliothyridina orbicularis – or unidentified related form
  - †Cliothyridina sublamellosa – or unidentified related form
- †Clisiophyllum
- †Clorinda
- †Codonofusiella
- †Coelocaulus
  - †Coelocaulus karlae – type locality for species
- †Coeloconus
- †Coelospira
- †Coelotrochium
- †Coenites
- †Colpomya – tentative report
  - †Colpomya audae – or unidentified related form
  - †Colpomya hugini – or unidentified related form
- †Compacoleus
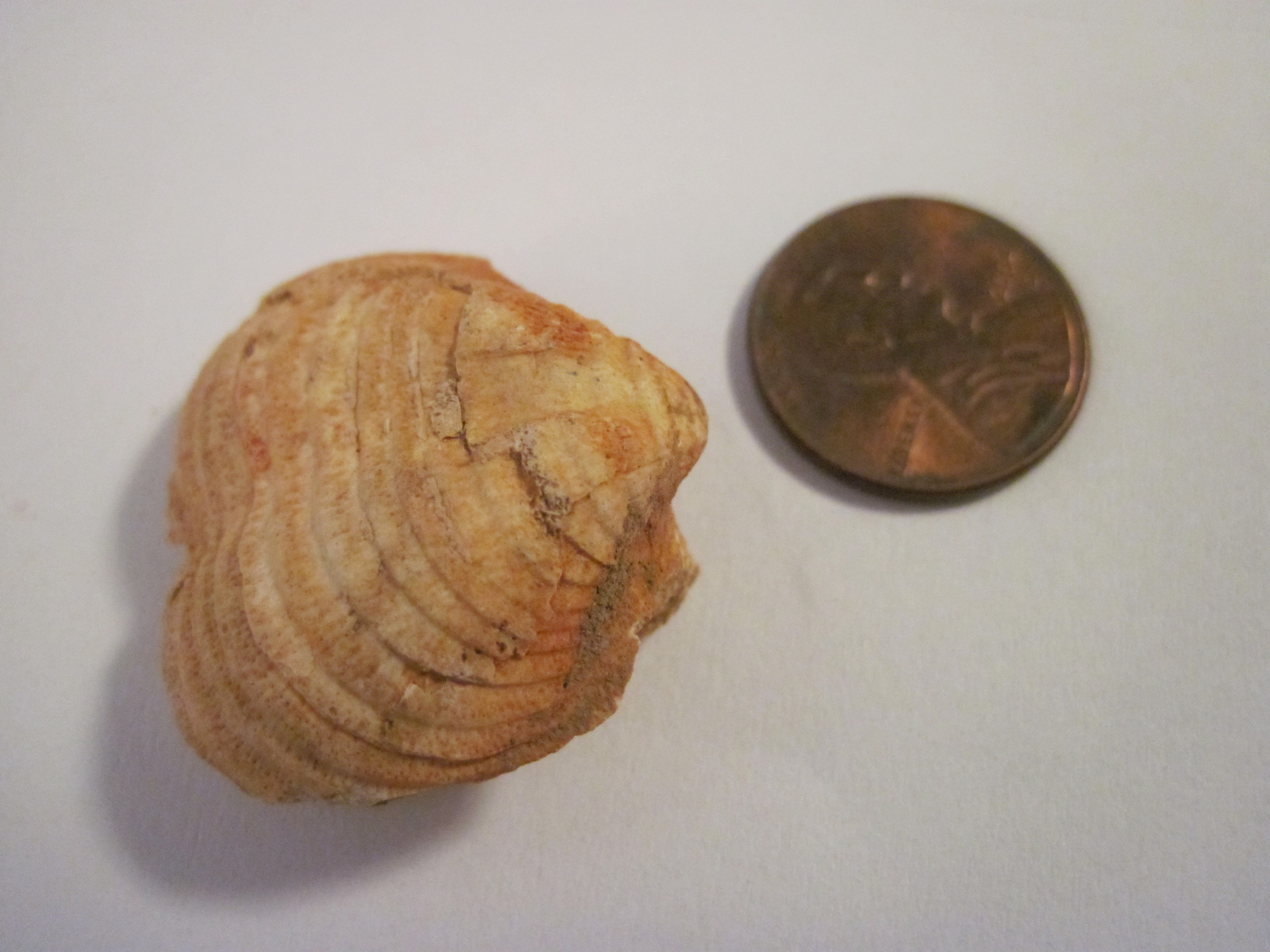
- Fossilized shell of the Late Devonian-Permian brachiopod Composita
  †Composita
  - †Composita ambigua – or unidentified comparable form
  - †Composita bellula – or unidentified related form
- †Comuquia
  - †Comuquia curvirostris – or unidentified related form
- †Conchidium
  - †Conchidium alaskense
  - †Conchidium knighti
- †Condrathyris
  - †Condrathyris perplexa
- †Conocardium
- †Contortophyllum
- †Cordylodus – tentative report
- †Corymbospongia
  - †Corymbospongia adnata
  - †Corymbospongia amplia – type locality for species
  - †Corymbospongia betella
- †Corynexochus
  - †Corynexochus perforatus
  - †Corynexochus plumula
- †Corynoides
  - †Corynoides tricornis
- †Cotalagnostus – or unidentified comparable form
  - †Cotalagnostus lens
- †Cranaena
  - †Cranaena romingeri – or unidentified comparable form
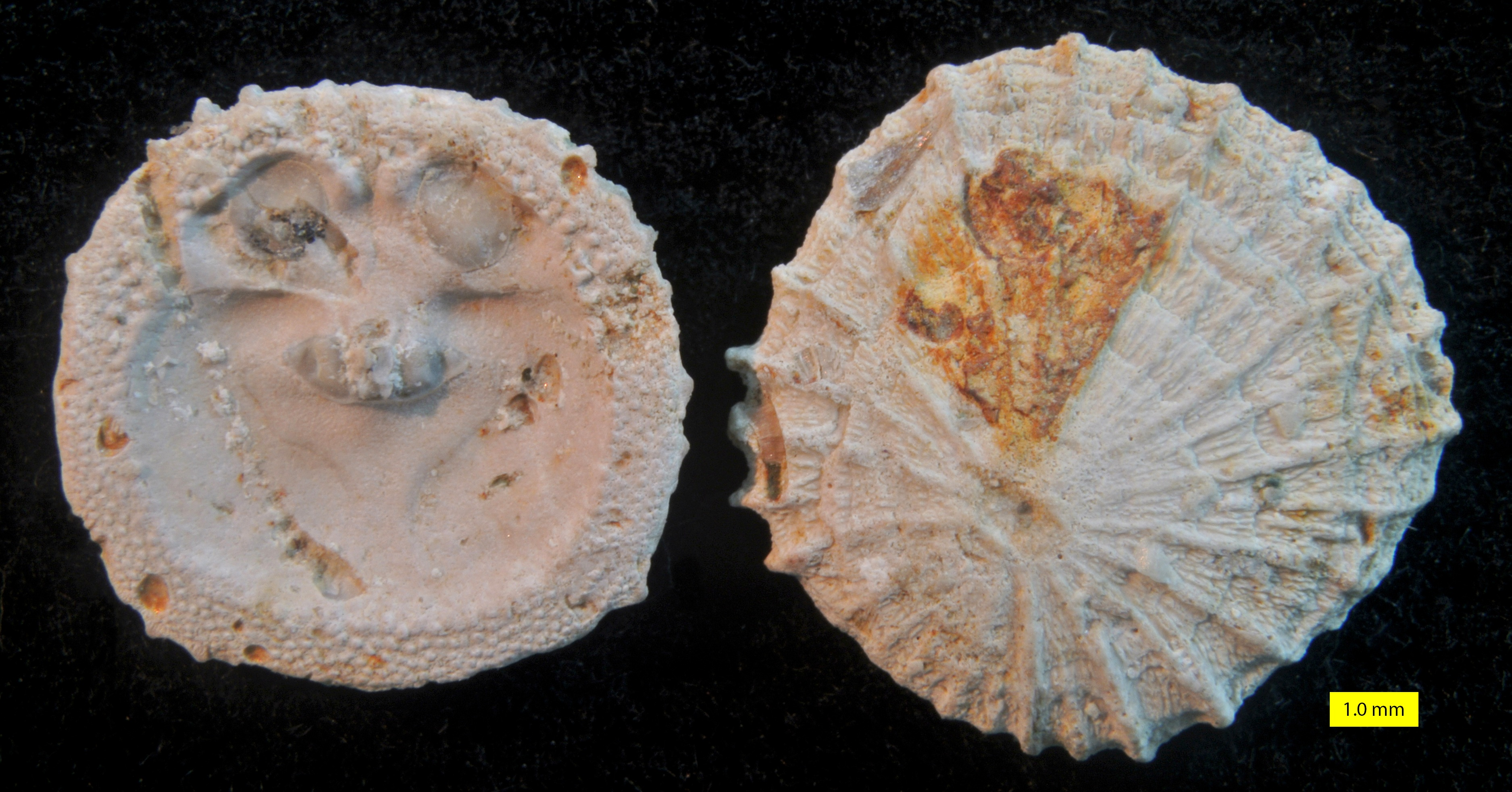
- Fossilized shell of the Late Cretaceous brachiopod Crania
  †Crania
- †Craspedalosia – tentative report
- †Craspedelia
  - †Craspedelia potterella – type locality for species
- †Crassialveolites
- †Craterophyllum – or unidentified comparable form
- †Craticula – report made of unidentified related form or using admittedly obsolete nomenclature
  - †Craticula gotlandica
- †Crurithyris
  - †Crurithyris alaskensis – type locality for species
- †Cryptacanthia
  - †Cryptacanthia compacta – or unidentified related form
- †Cryptograptus
  - †Cryptograptus centrifugus – or unidentified comparable form
  - †Cryptograptus schaferi
  - †Cryptograptus tricornis
- †Cyathactis
- †Cyathaxonia
- †Cyathodictya
- †Cyathophylloides
- †Cyathophyllum
- †Cyclonema
  - †Cyclonema servus
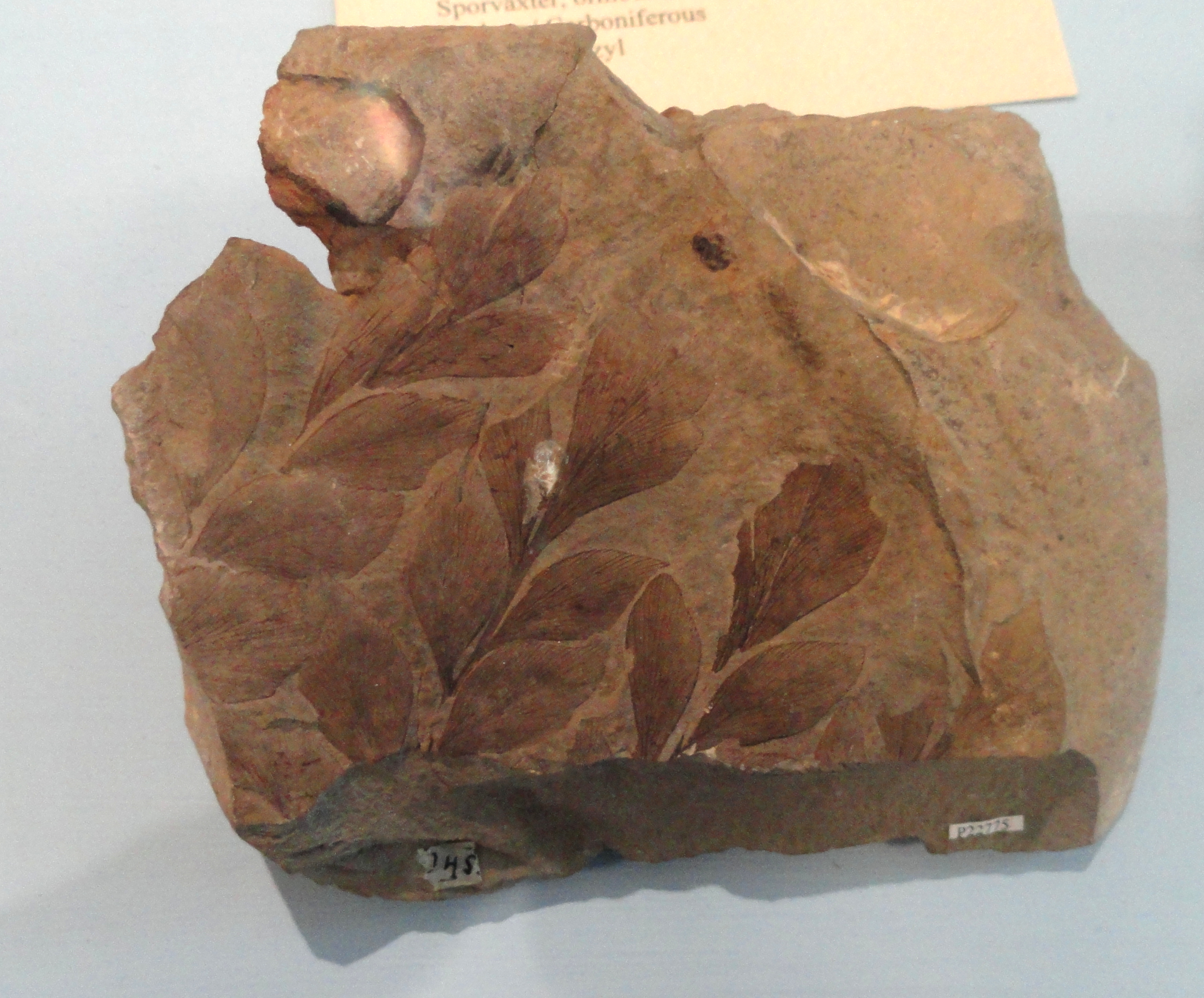
- Fossilized foliage from the Carboniferous seed fern Cyclopteris
  †Cyclopteris – tentative report
- †Cyclospira
  - †Cyclospira elegantula
  - †Cyclospira orbus
- †Cymbidium
  - †Cymbidium acutum
  - †Cymbidium retrorsum
- †Cymostrophia
  - †Cymostrophia costatula – or unidentified comparable form
- †Cyphaspis
- †Cypricardella
- †Cypricardina
  - †Cypricardina consimilis – or unidentified related form
- †Cypricardinia
  - †Cypricardinia contexta
- †Cyrolexis
  - †Cyrolexis superstes – or unidentified related form
- †Cyrtia
- †Cyrtina
  - †Cyrtina billingsi – or unidentified comparable form
- †Cyrtinaella
  - †Cyrtinaella undulata
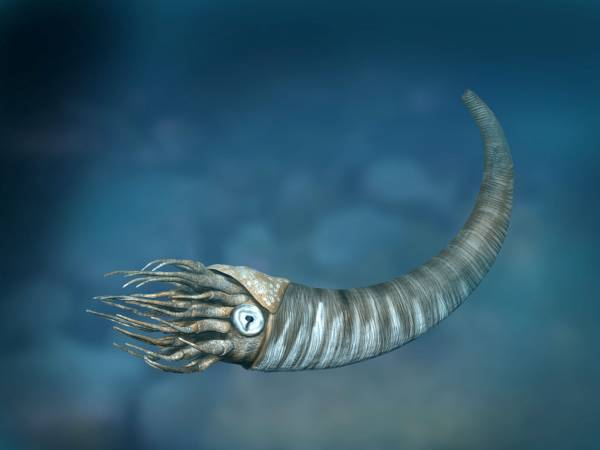
- Restoration of the Cambrian-Middle Devonian nautiloid cephalopod Cyrtoceras
  †Cyrtoceras
- †Cyrtospira
- †Cyrtospirifer
  - †Cyrtospirifer buddingtoni – type locality for species
  - †Cyrtospirifer paridaensis
- †Cystihalysites
- †Cystiphylloides
- †Cystiphyllum
- †Cystodictya
  - †Cystodictya lineata – or unidentified related form
  - †Cystodictya pustulosa – or unidentified related form
- †Cystostroma
- †Cystothalamiella
  - †Cystothalamiella alaskaensis
  - †Cystothalamiella ducta
  - †Cystothalamiella irregularis – type locality for species
  - †Cystothalamiella polyducta
- Cytherella – tentative report
- †Cyztograptus

== D ==
- †Daidia
  - †Daidia cerithioides
  - †Daidia sewardensis
- †Dalmanella
  - †Dalmanella occlusa
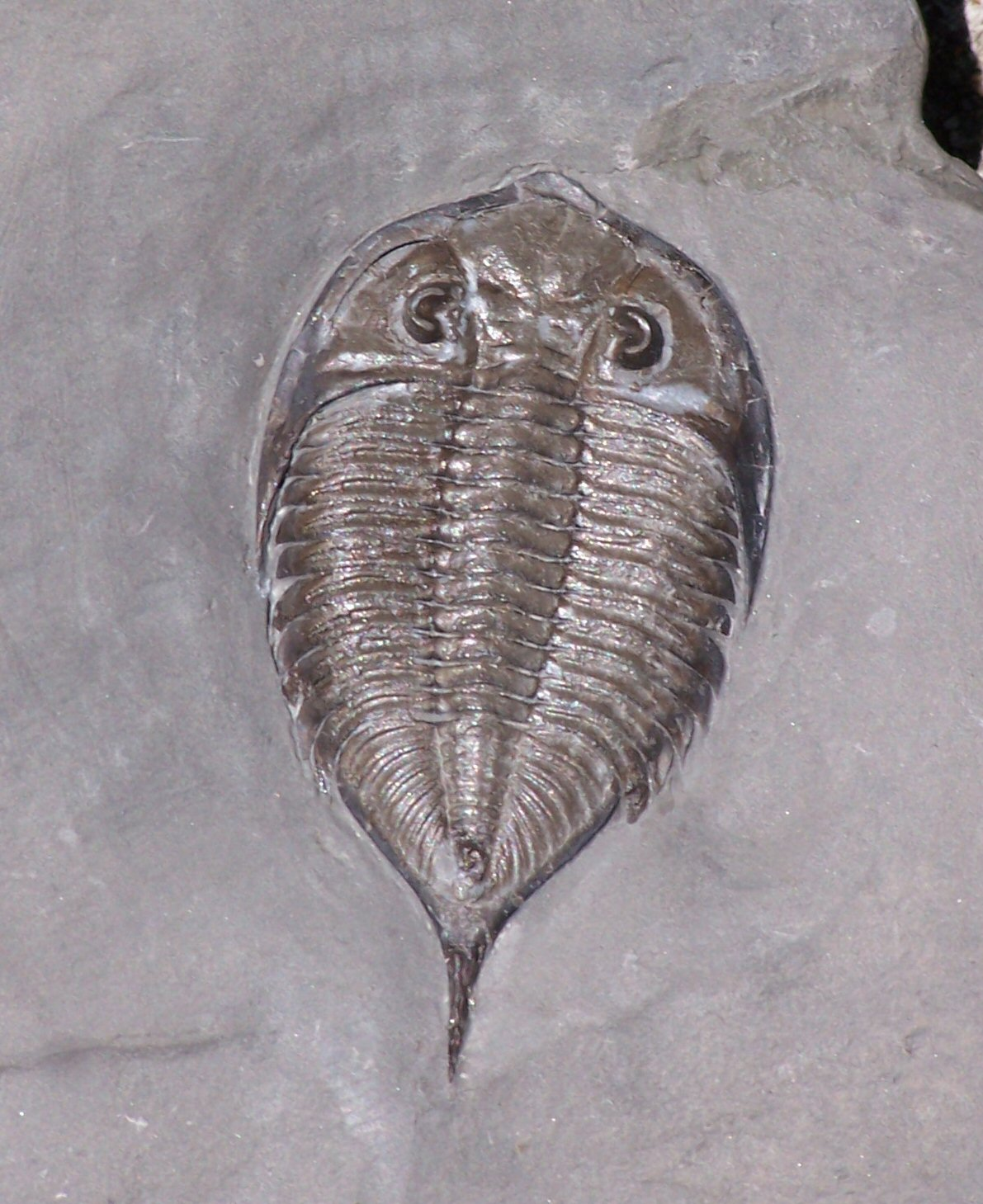
- Fossil of the Late Ordovician-Middle Devonian trilobite Dalmanites
  †Dalmanites
- †Dasometopus
  - †Dasometopus breviceps
- †Dechenella
- †Decorospira
  - †Decorospira lepaini – type locality for species
  - †Decorospira minutula – type locality for species
  - †Decorospira tasselli
- †Deiracorallium
- †Delthyris
  - †Delthyris sulcatus
- †Deltopecten
  - †Deltopecten caneyanus – or unidentified related form
  - †Deltopecten wyandotte – or unidentified related form
- †Dendrograptus
- †Dendrostella
  - †Dendrostella rhenana – or unidentified comparable form
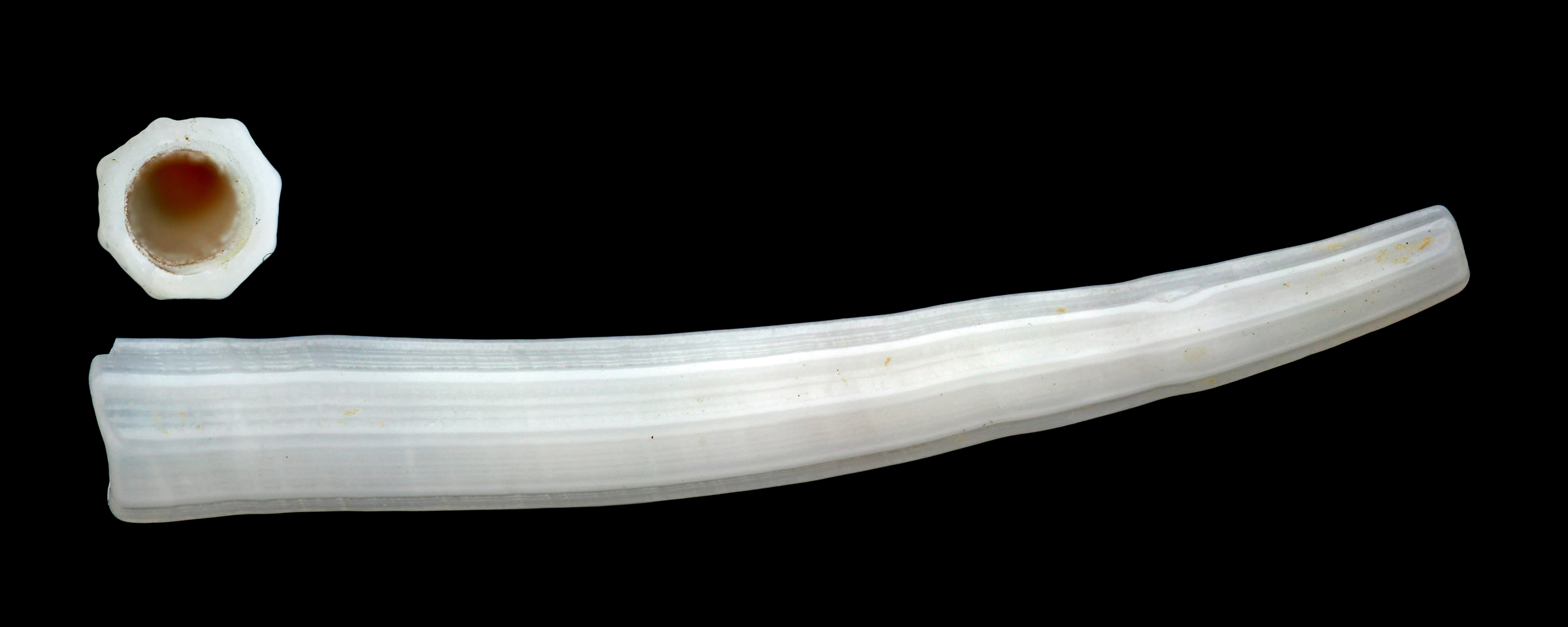
- Shell of a Dentalium tusk shell
  †Dentalium
  - †Dentalium hecetaensis
- †Derbyia
  - †Derbyia bennetti – or unidentified related form
  - †Derbyia grandis – or unidentified comparable form
  - †Derbyia robusta – or unidentified related form
- †Diambonia
  - †Diambonia discuneata
- †Diaphragmus
- †Dicellograptus
  - †Dicellograptus caduceus – or unidentified comparable form
  - †Dicellograptus elegans – or unidentified comparable form
  - †Dicellograptus gurleyi
  - †Dicellograptus sextans
  - †Dicellograptus smithi – or unidentified comparable form
- †Dicoelosia
  - †Dicoelosia jonesridgensis
- †Dicranograptus
  - †Dicranograptus contortus – tentative report
- †Dicricoconus
  - †Dicricoconus dutroi
  - †Dicricoconus mesodevonicus
  - †Dicricoconus triannulatus
- †Dictyoclostus
  - †Dictyoclostus gallatinensis – or unidentified related form
  - †Dictyoclostus semireticulatus
  - †Dictyoclostus tartaricus
- †Dictyonema
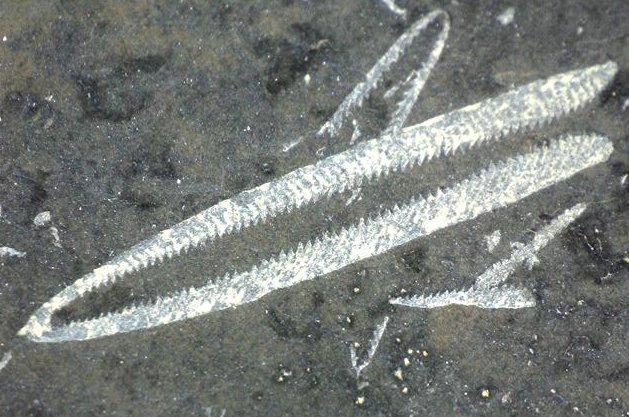
- Fossil of the Middle Ordovician graptolite Didymograptus
  †Didymograptus
  - †Didymograptus extensus – or unidentified comparable form
  - †Didymograptus nitidus – or unidentified comparable form
  - †Didymograptus sagitticaulis
  - †Didymograptus serratulus
- †Dielasma
  - †Dielasma arkansanum – or unidentified related form
  - †Dielasma bovidens – or unidentified related form
  - †Dielasma formosum – or unidentified related form
  - †Dielasma supracarbonicum – or unidentified related form
- †Digonophyllum
- †Dimorphograptus
  - †Dimorphograptus confertus
  - †Dimorphograptus physophora
- †Diorthelasma
  - †Diorthelasma parvum
- †Diparelasma
- †Diphyphyllum
- †Diplochone
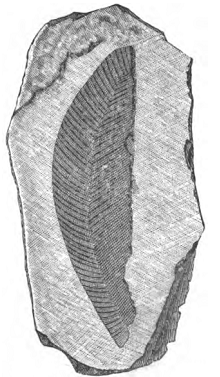
- Cambrian graptolite Diplograptus
  †Diplograptus
  - †Diplograptus cyperoides – or unidentified comparable form
  - †Diplograptus elongatus
  - †Diplograptus euglyptus
  - †Diplograptus hughesi
  - †Diplograptus inutilis
  - †Diplograptus modestus
  - †Diplograptus mucroterminatus
  - †Diplograptus multidens – or unidentified related form
  - †Diplograptus nicolsoni – or unidentified comparable form
- †Diplopora – tentative report
- †Disphyllum
  - †Disphyllum catenatum – or unidentified comparable form
  - †Disphyllum goldfussi – or unidentified comparable form
- †Disphyllym – tentative report
- †Diversograptus
- †Doleroides
  - †Doleroides panna – or unidentified related form
- †Donaldiella
- †Donaldospira
  - †Donaldospira pertusa
- †Dorypyge
  - †Dorypyge olenekensis – or unidentified comparable form
- †Drepanodus
- †Drepanoistodus
  - †Drepanoistodus suberectus
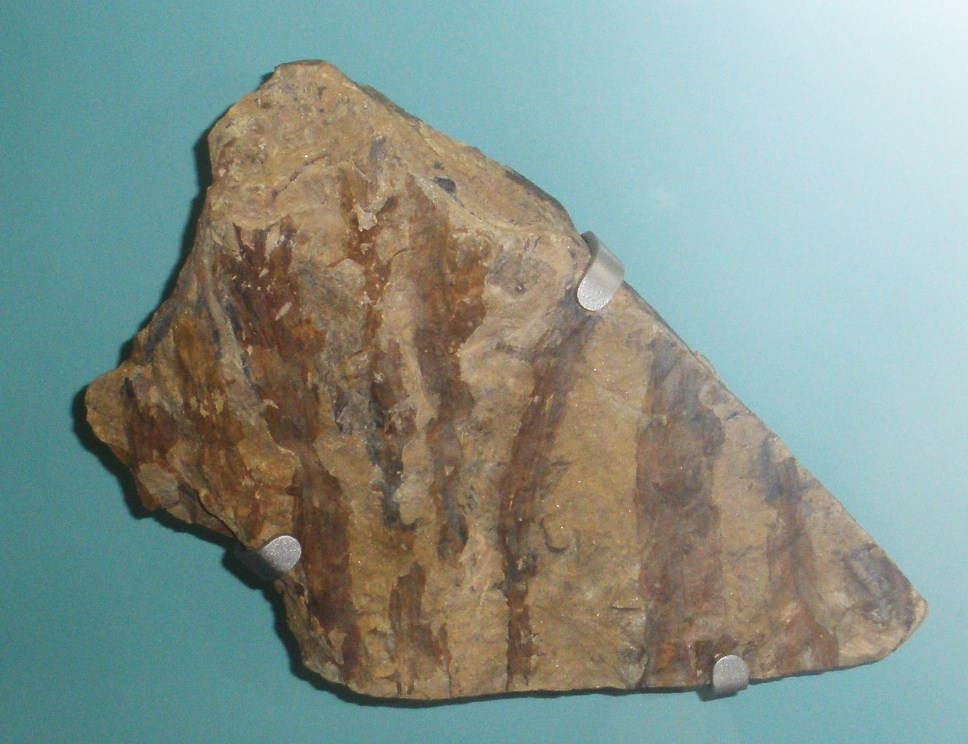
- Fossilized foliage from the Early-Late Devonian club moss relative Drepanophycus
  †Drepanophycus
- †Droharhynchia
  - †Droharhynchia rzhonsnitskayae – type locality for species
- †Dubovikovia
  - †Dubovikovia kuzmini – or unidentified comparable form
- †Dunbarula
- †Dunderbergia
  - †Dunderbergia seducta – type locality for species
- †Duolobella – type locality for genus
  - †Duolobella sandiae – type locality for species
- †Dutrochus – type locality for genus
  - †Dutrochus alaskensis – type locality for species
- †Dyoros
  - †Dyoros spitzbergianus – or unidentified comparable form
- †Dytremacephalus – tentative report

== E ==
- †Echinoconchus
  - †Echinoconchus punctatus
- †Echyropora – tentative report
- †Ectomaria
  - †Ectomaria orientalis
  - †Ectomaria pagoda – or unidentified comparable form
  - †Ectomaria prisca – or unidentified comparable form
- †Edmondia
- †Ekvasophyllum
- †Elburgia
  - †Elburgia disgranosa – type locality for species
- †Eleutherokomma
- †Eleutherospira
  - †Eleutherospira medfraensis
- † Ella – tentative report
  - †Ella simensis – or unidentified related form
- †Ellesmeroceras
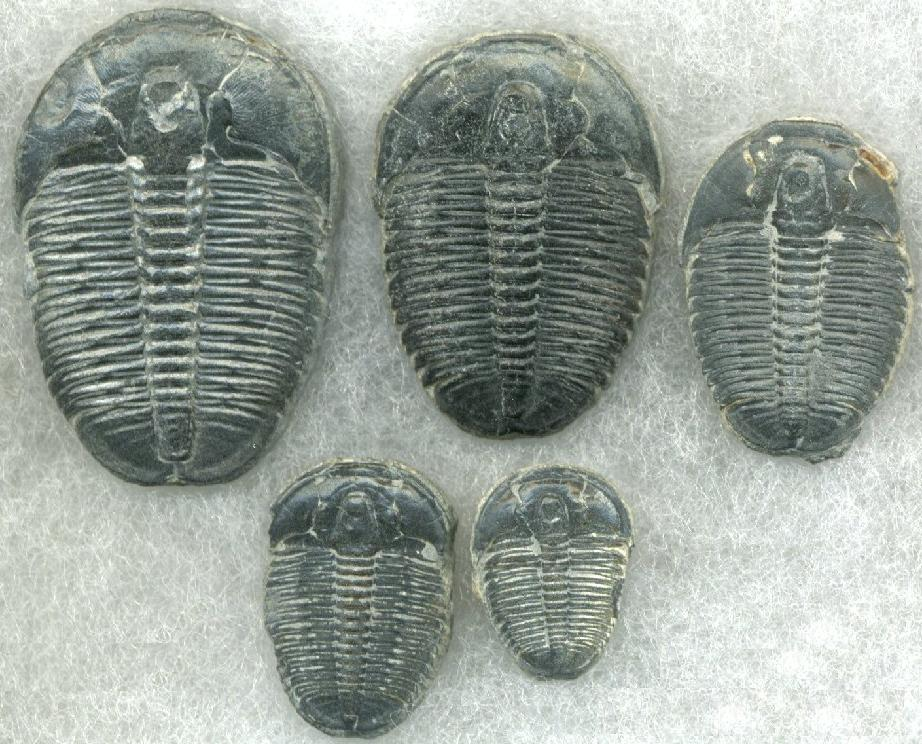
- Fossils at different stages of development of the Cambrian trilobite Elrathia
  †Elrathia
  - †Elrathia alaskensis – type locality for species
- †Emanuella
  - †Emanuella altus
  - †Emanuella neumani
- †Emmonsia
- †Endothyra
  - †Endothyra bowmani – or unidentified related form
- †Entactinia
  - †Entactinia modesta
- †Enteletes – tentative report
- †Entelophyllum – tentative report
- †Entomis
  - †Entomis pelagica
- †Eoasianites
- †Eoconchidium
- †Eognathodus
  - †Eognathodus sulcatus
- †Eomarginifera
  - †Eomarginifera longispinus
- †Eomoelleritia – tentative report
- †Eopteria
  - †Eopteria richardsoni
- †Eoreticularia – tentative report
- †Eoschuchertella
- †Eospirifer
- †Epiphyton
- †Epitomyonia
  - †Epitomyonia relicina
- †Euchondria – tentative report
  - †Euchondria neglecta – or unidentified related form
- †Euconospira
  - †Euconospira conula – or unidentified related form
- †Eumetria
  - †Eumetria verneuiliana
- †Eunema
  - †Eunema quadrisulcata – or unidentified comparable form
- †Euomphalopteris – tentative report
- †Euomphalopterus – type locality for genus
  - †Euomphalopterus liratus – type locality for species
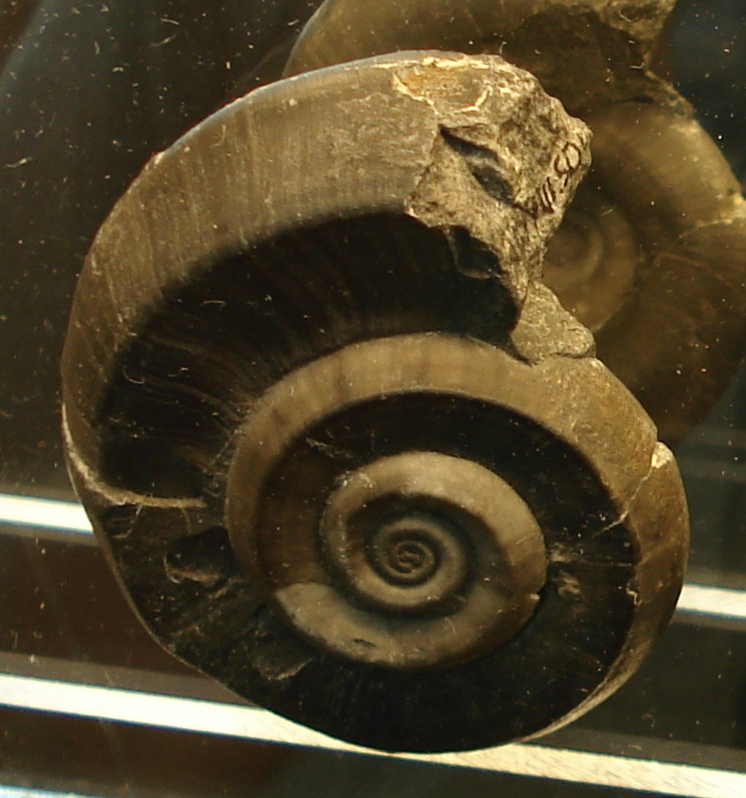
- Fossilized shell of the Silurian-Permian sea snail Euomphalus
  †Euomphalus
  - †Euomphalus brooksensis
  - †Euomphalus bundtzeni
  - †Euomphalus planodorsatus – or unidentified related form
  - †Euomphalus planorbis
  - †Euomphalus utahensis – or unidentified related form
- †Euphemites
  - †Euphemites carbonarius
- †Euryzone

== F ==
- †Faberophyllum
- †Falodus
- †Farewellia – type locality for genus
  - †Farewellia heidelbergerae – type locality for species
- †Fasciculatia
  - †Fasciculatia striatoparadoxa
- †Fasciphyllum – tentative report
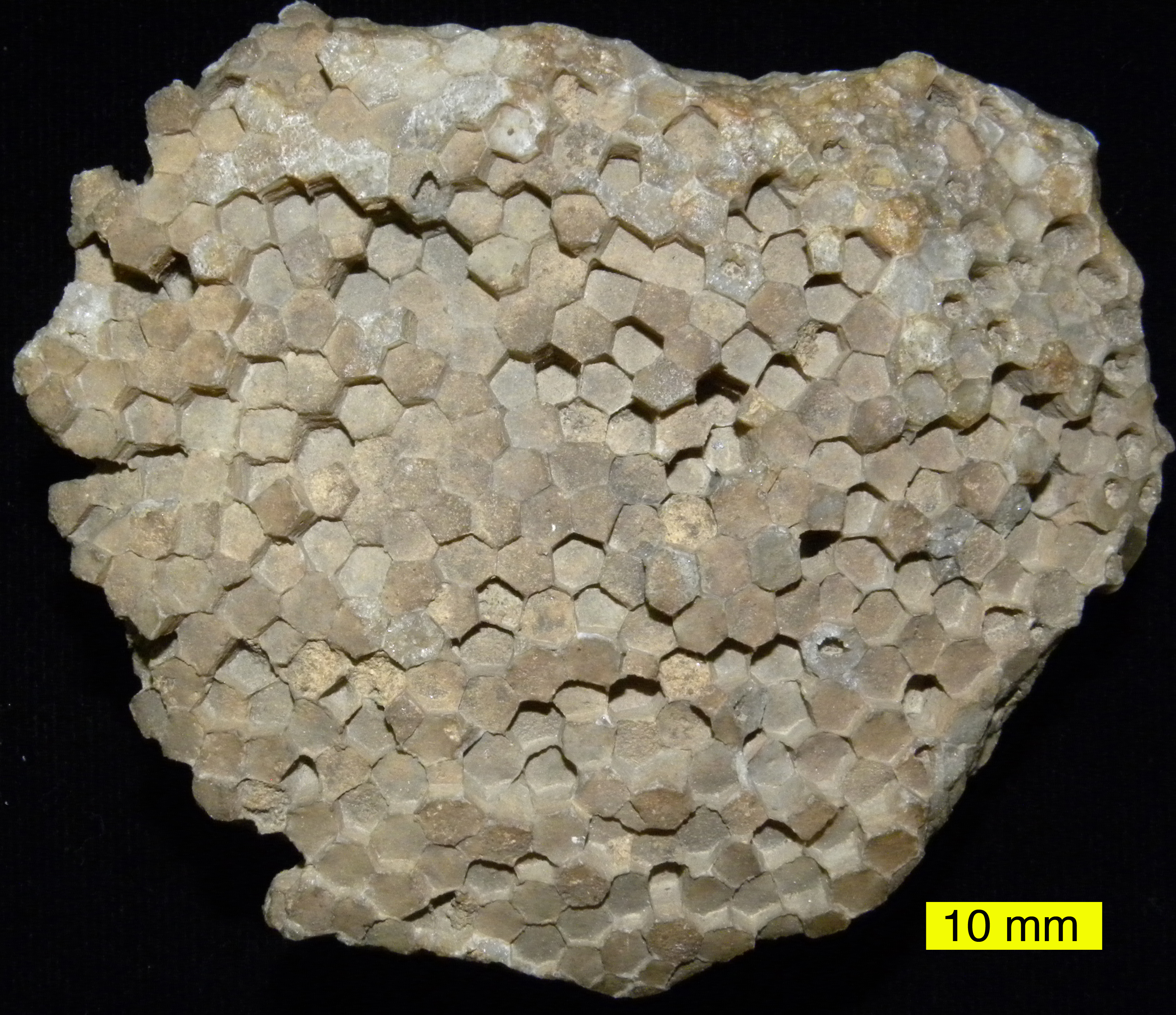
- Fossil of the Late Ordovician-Permian tabulate coral Favosites
  †Favosites
  - †Favosites emmonsi – or unidentified comparable form
  - †Favosites hemispericus
  - †Favosites hemisphericus
  - †Favosites limitaris
  - †Favosites radiciformis
- †Fenestella
- †Filigreenia
  - †Filigreenia circularis
- †Finkelnburgia
- †Fistulella
  - †Fistulella undosa
- †Fistulipora
- †Fletcheria – tentative report
- †Fluctuaria
  - †Fluctuaria undata – or unidentified related form
- †Follicucullus
  - †Follicucullus monacanthus – or unidentified related form
- †Foordites
  - †Foordites platypleura – or unidentified comparable form
- †Fusispira
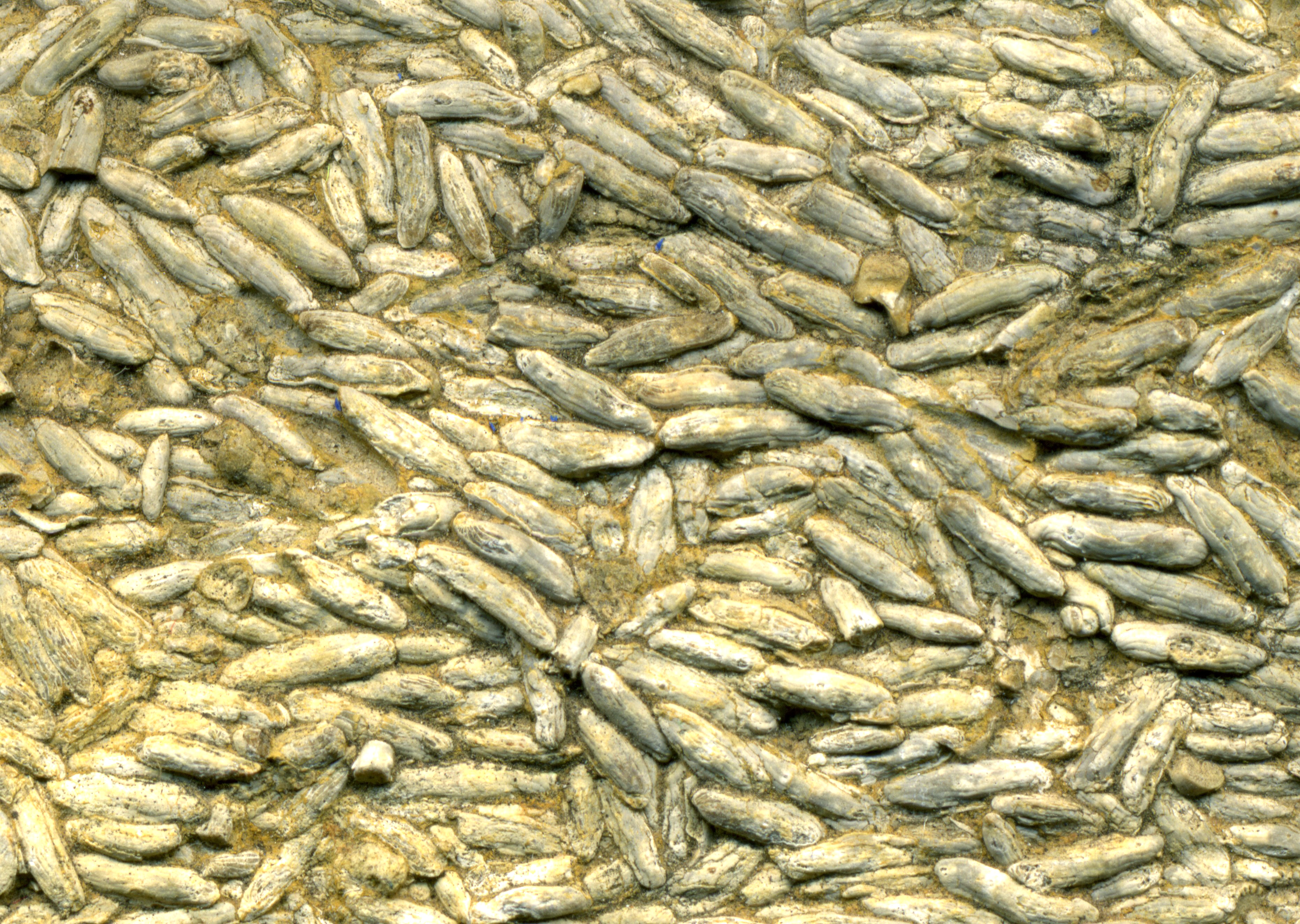
- Assemblage of fossils of Silurian-Permian fusulinid foraminiferans
  †Fusulina
  - †Fusulina elongata – or unidentified related form
- †Fusulinella
  - †Fusulinella eopulchra – or unidentified comparable form

== G ==
- †Gasterocoma – tentative report
  - †Gasterocoma bicauli
- †Gastrioceras
  - †Gastrioceras nolinense – or unidentified related form
- †Gelidorthis
  - †Gelidorthis perisiberiaensis
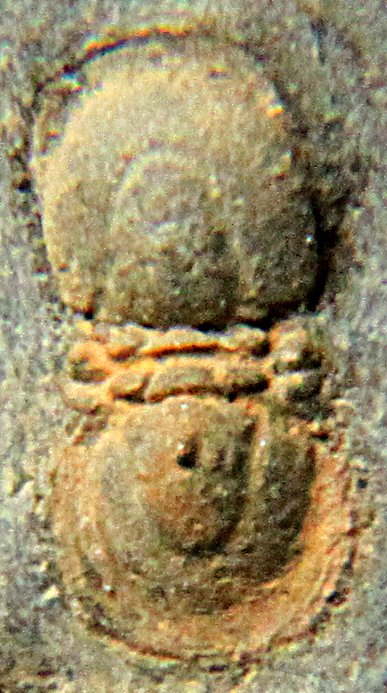
- Fossil of the Early-Late Ordovician trilobite Geragnostus
  †Geragnostus
- †Gervillia
  - †Gervillia longa – or unidentified related form
- †Girtyella
- †Girtyocoelia – type locality for genus
  - †Girtyocoelia epiporata
  - †Girtyocoelia minima
- †Girvanella
  - †Girvanella problematica
- †Glaberagnostus
  - †Glaberagnostus cicer
- †Glabrocingulum
  - †Glabrocingulum grayvillense – or unidentified related form
- †Globoendothyra
- †Glossograptus
  - †Glossograptus dentatus – or unidentified comparable form
  - †Glossograptus echinatus – or unidentified comparable form
  - †Glossograptus hincksii
  - †Glossograptus horridus
  - †Glossograptus hystrix – or unidentified related form
- †Glyptograptus
  - †Glyptograptus enodis – or unidentified comparable form
  - †Glyptograptus gnomus
  - †Glyptograptus incertus
  - †Glyptograptus laciniosus
  - †Glyptograptus lanpherei
  - †Glyptograptus tamariscus
- †Glyptopora
- †Gomphoceras
- †Goniatites
- †Goniocladia – tentative report
- †Goniophora
  - †Goniophora thula – type locality for species
- †Grammysia
- †Granularaspis
- †Graptospongia
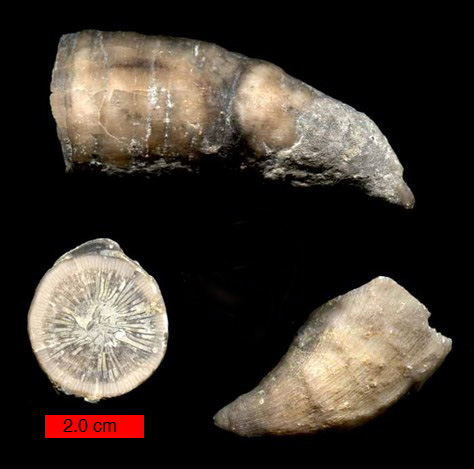
- Multiple views of a fossil of the Ordovician horn coral Grewingkia
  †Grewingkia
- †Grypophyllum
- †Gypidula
  - †Gypidula cornuta
  - †Gypidula intervenicus – or unidentified comparable form
  - †Gypidula optatus
  - †Gypidula orbitatus
  - †Gypidula pelagica
  - †Gypidula perryi
  - †Gypidula upatensis
- †Gypiduloides
  - †Gypiduloides craigenensis
- †Gypospirifer
  - †Gypospirifer condor
- †Gyronema

== H ==
- †Hallograptus
  - †Hallograptus mucronatus
- †Halysites
- †Haplistion – tentative report
- †Haplospira
  - †Haplospira craigi – type locality for species
- †Hardyoides
  - †Hardyoides aspinosa – type locality for species
- †Harperoides – type locality for genus
  - †Harperoides alaskensis – type locality for species
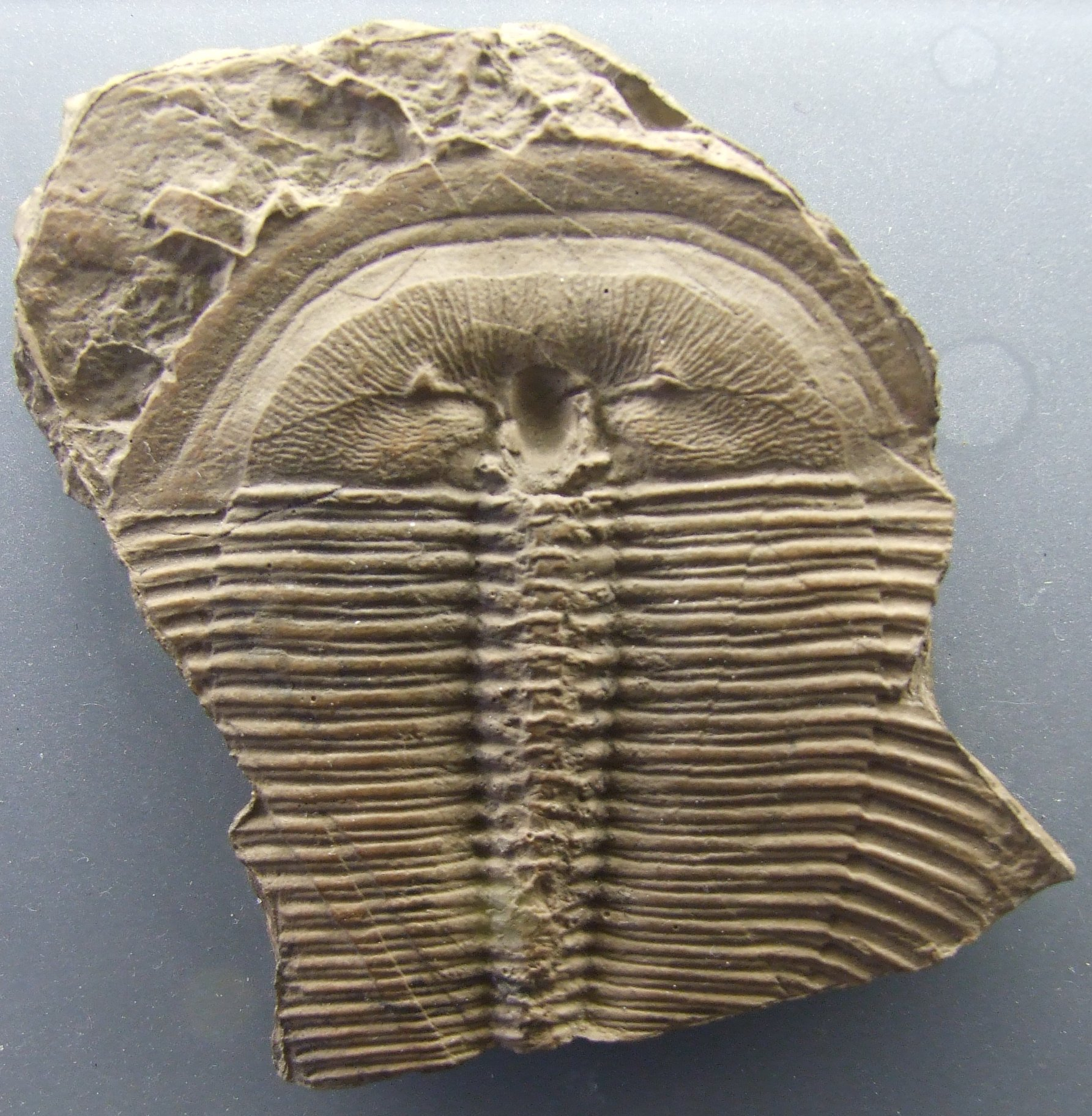
- Fossil of the Devonian trilobite Harpides
  †Harpides
- †Harpidium
  - †Harpidium insignis
  - †Harpidium latus
  - †Harpidium rotundus
- †Hartshillia
  - †Hartshillia clivosa
- †Hecetaphyton
  - †Hecetaphyton alaskense
- †Hecetastoma – type locality for genus
  - †Hecetastoma gehrelsi – type locality for species
- †Hedstroemia – tentative report
- †Hedstromophyllum
- †Helicotoma
  - †Helicotoma blodgetti – type locality for species
  - †Helicotoma robinsoni – type locality for species
- †Heliolites
- †Heliophyllum
- †Helioplasmolites
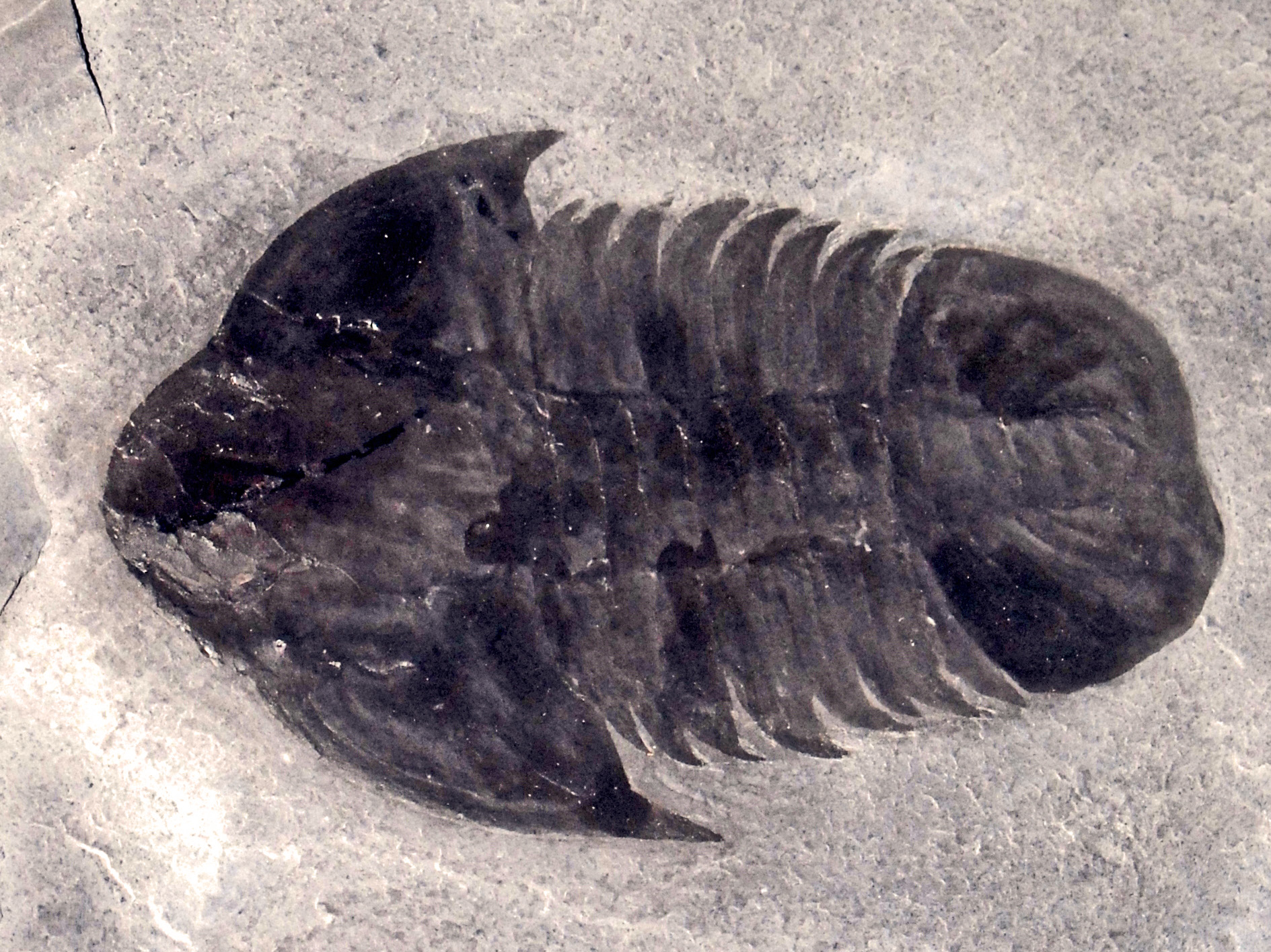
- Fossil of the Cambrian trilobite Hemirhodon
  †Hemirhodon
- †Hemitrypa
- †Hercynella
  - †Hercynella bohemica
  - †Hercynella nobilis
- †Hexagonaria
- †Hindeodus
- †Holopea
- †Holopella
- †Homagnostus
  - †Homagnostus alaskensis – type locality for species
- †Hormospongia – type locality for genus
  - †Hormospongia acara – type locality for species
  - †Hormospongia diarteria – type locality for species
  - †Hormospongia labyrinthica – type locality for species
- †Hormotoma
- †Horridonia
  - †Horridonia horrida
- †Hostimella
- †Howellella
  - †Howellella amsdeni
  - †Howellella nucula
  - †Howellella yacutica
- †Howellites
  - †Howellites amsdeni – type locality for species
- †Howittia
  - †Howittia haideri
- †Hustedia
  - †Hustedia meekana – or unidentified related form
  - †Hustedia remota – or unidentified related form
- †Hustedograptus
  - †Hustedograptus teretiusculus
- †Hypagnostus
- †Hypomphalocirrus
  - †Hypomphalocirrus rugosus – or unidentified comparable form
- †Hypothyridina
  - †Hypothyridina magister

== I ==
- †Icriodus
  - †Icriodus angustoides
  - †Icriodus taimyricus
- †Iddingsia
  - †Iddingsia relativa – type locality for species
- †Idiognathodus
- †Idiostroma
- †Imperatoria
  - †Imperatoria media
- †Iowaphyllum
  - †Iowaphyllum johanni – or unidentified comparable form
- †Iowatrypa
  - †Iowatrypa owenensis
- †Iskutella
  - †Iskutella gunningi
- †Isochilina
- †Isograptus
  - †Isograptus forcipiformis
  - †Isograptus manubriatus – or unidentified comparable form
- †Isorthis
- †Ivdelinia

== J ==
- †Janius
  - †Janius velatus – or unidentified comparable form
- †Jedria
  - †Jedria deckeri
- †Johnsonathyris – type locality for genus
  - †Johnsonathyris adrianensis – type locality for species
- †Juraspis
  - †Juraspis schabanovi
- †Juresania
  - †Juresania juresanensis – or unidentified related form

== K ==
- †Kahlerina
- †Karavankina
  - †Karavankina fasciata – or unidentified related form
- †Ketophyllum
- †Kindleina – type locality for genus
  - †Kindleina suemezensis – type locality for species
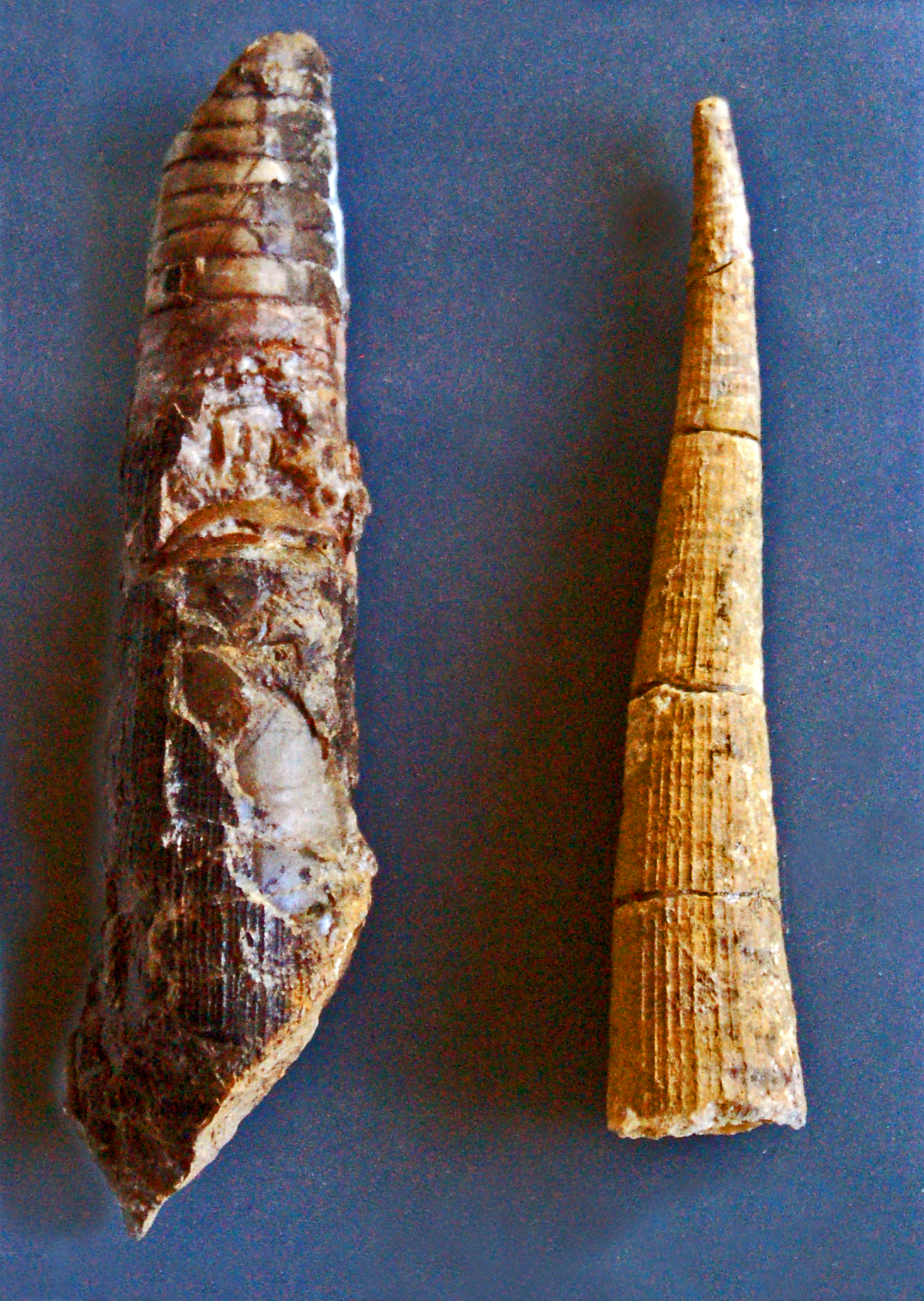
- Fossilized shells of the Middle Ordovician-Permian nautiloid cephalopod Kionoceras
  †Kionoceras
- †Kirkidium
- †Kirkirhynchus
  - †Kirkirhynchus reesidei
- †Kirkospira – type locality for genus
  - †Kirkospira glacialis – type locality for species
  - †Kirkospira tongassensis – type locality for species
- †Kitikamispira
  - †Kitikamispira ormistoni
- †Klakesia
- †Kochiproductus
  - †Kochiproductus porrectus – or unidentified related form
- †Komiella
  - †Komiella gilberti – type locality for species
  - †Komiella ostiolata – or unidentified related form
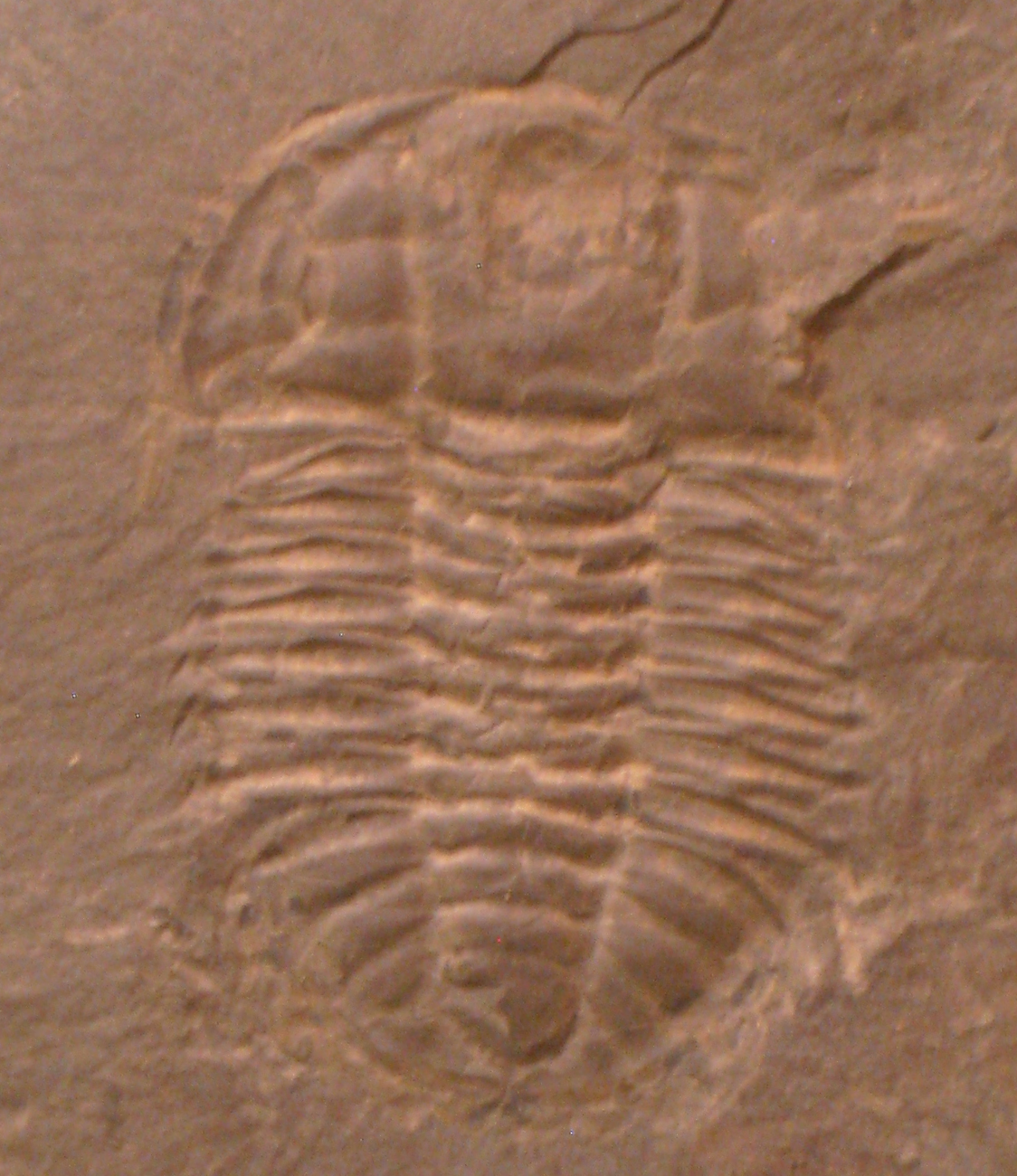
- Fossil of the Cambrian trilobite Kootenia
  †Kootenia
  - †Kootenia anabarensis – or unidentified comparable form
  - †Kootenia granulospinosa – type locality for species
  - †Kootenia serrata – or unidentified comparable form
- †Krausella
- †Krotovia
  - †Krotovia pustulata – or unidentified related form
- †Kuskokwimia – type locality for genus
  - †Kuskokwimia moorei – type locality for species
- †Kuvelousia
  - †Kuvelousia sphiva
  - †Kuvelousia weyprechti – or unidentified comparable form

== L ==
- †Labechia
- †Labyrinthites
- †Lacunoporaspis
- Laevidentalium
  - †Laevidentalium venustum – or unidentified related form
- †Laioporella
  - †Laioporella pyramidata – or unidentified related form
- †Lamprophyllum
- †Latentifistula
- †Laticrura
  - †Laticrura pionodema
- †Lecanospira – tentative report
- †Leioclema
- †Leiorhynchus
  - †Leiorhynchus greenianum – or unidentified related form
- †Lejopyge
  - †Lejopyge calva
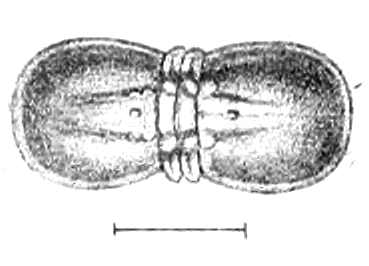
  - Illustration of a fossil of the Cambrian trilobite Lejopyge laevigata
    †Lejopyge laevigata
- †Leperditia
- †Lepidocoleus
  - †Lepidocoleus britannicus
- †Leptaena
  - †Leptaena alaskensis – type locality for species
- †Leptathyris
  - †Leptathyris borki
- †Leptellina
  - †Leptellina occidentalis
- †Leptelloidea
  - †Leptelloidea leptelloides
- †Leptodesma
- †Leptograptus
- †Leptostrophia
- †Libumella – tentative report
- †Licharewia
- †Lichas
- †Ligiscus
  - †Ligiscus smithi – type locality for species
- Lima
- †Linguagnostus
  - †Linguagnostus gronwalli
- †Lingula
  - †Lingula freboldi
- Linguopugnoides
  - †Linguopugnoides carens
- †Linograptus
  - †Linograptus posthumus – or unidentified related form
- †Linoproductus
  - †Linoproductus cora
  - †Linoproductus lineatus – or unidentified related form
  - †Linoproductus tenuistriatus – or unidentified related form
- †Liosotella
  - †Liosotella proboscidea – or unidentified comparable form
- †Liospira
  - †Liospira micula
  - †Liospira progne – or unidentified comparable form
- †Lissatrypa – tentative report
- †Lissochonetes
  - †Lissochonetes geinitzianus – or unidentified related form
  - †Lissochonetes morahensis – or unidentified related form
  - †Lissochonetes superba – or unidentified comparable form
- †Lithostrotion
  - †Lithostrotion mclareni
  - †Lithostrotion portlocki – or unidentified related form
  - †Lithostrotion sinuosum
  - †Lithostrotion warreni
- †Lithostrotionella
  - †Lithostrotionella banffensis
  - †Lithostrotionella birdi
- †Loganograptus
- †Lonsdaleia
- †Lophophyllum
- †Lophospira
  - †Lophospira perangulata – or unidentified comparable form
  - †Lophospira serrulata – or unidentified related form
- †Loxonema
- †Loyolophyllum
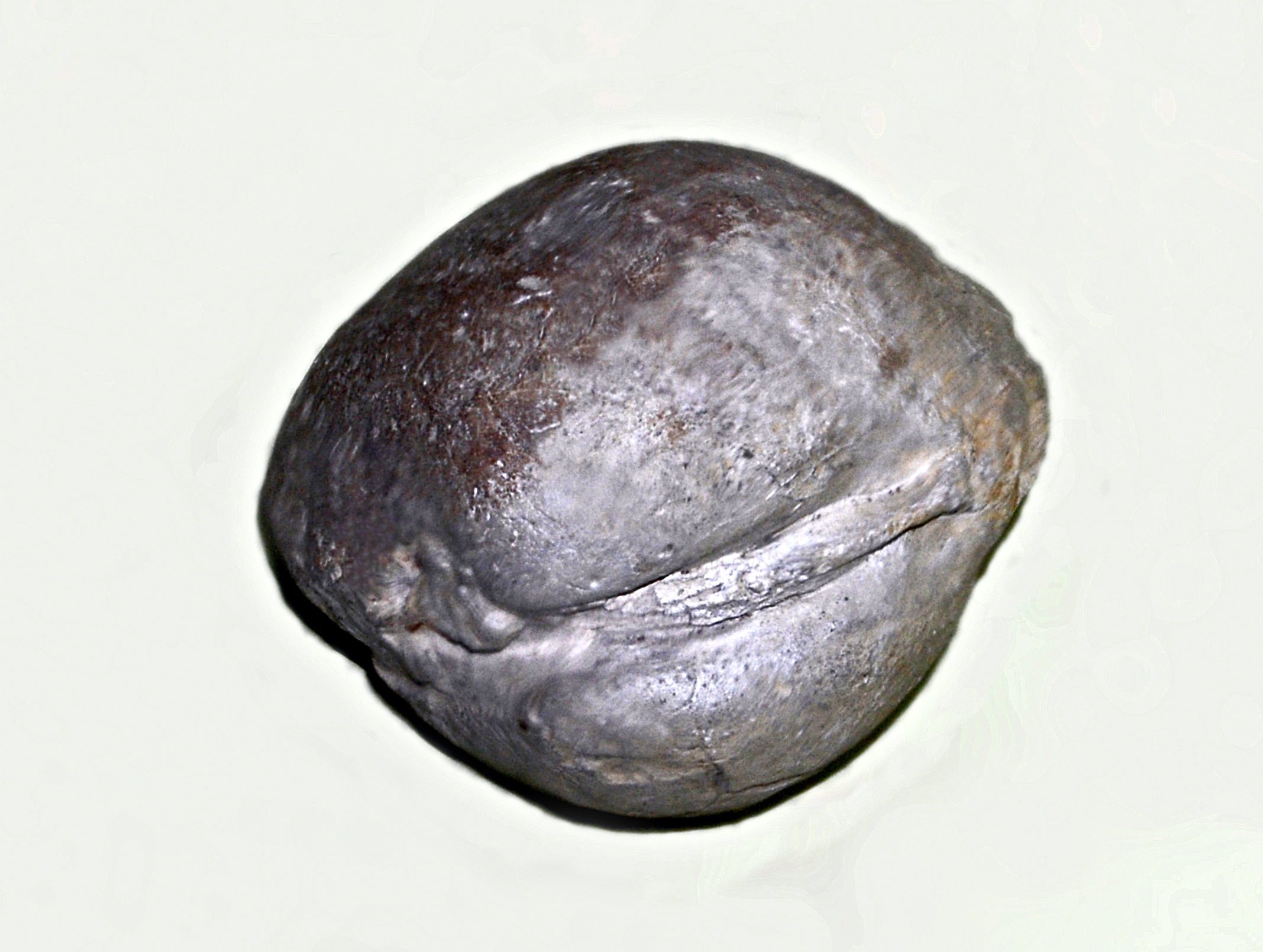
- Fossilized shell of the Devonian-modern marine bivalve Lucina
  †Lucina
  - †Lucina proavia – or unidentified comparable form
- †Ludlovia
  - †Ludlovia multispora
- †Lunucammina
- †Lunulazona
  - †Lunulazona sablei – type locality for species
- †Lykocustiphyllim – tentative report
- †Lyrielasma
- †Lytospira
  - †Lytospira subrotunda
- †Lytvophyllum – tentative report
  - †Lytvophyllum hongi

== M ==
- †Macgeea
- †Maclurina
  - †Maclurina manitobensis – or unidentified comparable form
- †Maclurites
  - †Maclurites magnus – or unidentified related form
- †Marginifera
  - †Marginifera involuta
  - †Marginifera juresanensis – or unidentified comparable form
  - †Marginifera lebedevi – or unidentified related form
  - †Marginifera splendens – or unidentified related form
  - †Marginifera typica – or unidentified related form
- †Marinurnula
  - †Marinurnula timanicum – or unidentified comparable form
- †Marjumia
  - †Marjumia callas
- †Martinia
  - †Martinia maia – or unidentified comparable form
- †Martiniopsis
- †Mastigospira
  - †Mastigospira weberae
- †Medfracaulus – type locality for genus
  - †Medfracaulus cooki – type locality for species
  - †Medfracaulus turriformis
- †Medfraspongia
  - †Medfraspongia tubulara
- †Medfrazyga – type locality for genus
  - †Medfrazyga clauticae – type locality for species
  - †Medfrazyga gilmulli – type locality for species
- †Medlicottia
  - †Medlicottia orbigiana – or unidentified related form
- †Meekella – tentative report
- †Meekospira
- †Megagnostus
  - †Megagnostus laevis
  - †Megagnostus resecta
- †Megalomus
- †Megousia
  - †Megousia aagardi
- †Mehlina
- †Menophyllum – tentative report
- †Mephiarges – tentative report
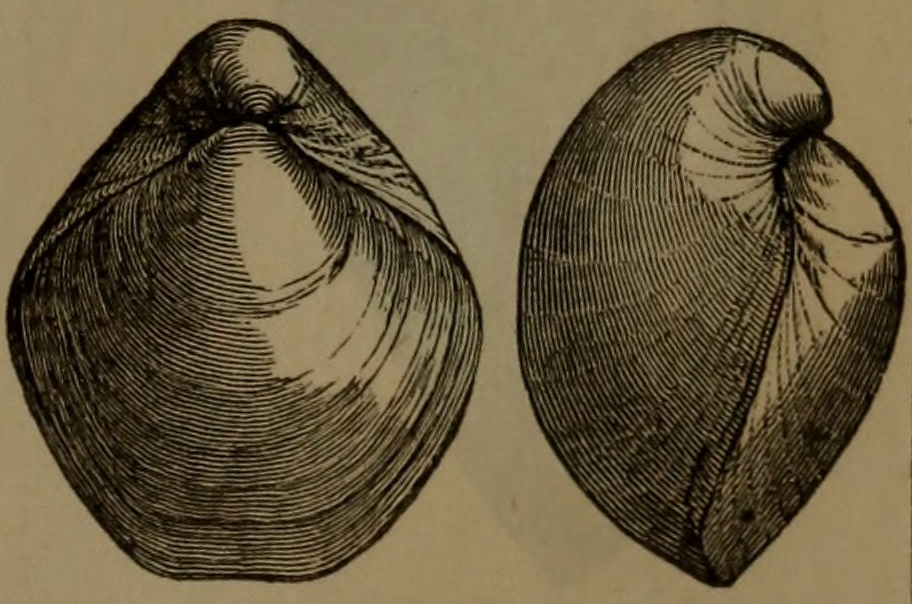
- Illustration (lower right, entry 15) of a fossilized shell in front and side views of the Silurian-Late Devonian brachiopod Meristella
  †Meristella
  - †Meristella barrisi – or unidentified comparable form
  - †Meristella ceras – or unidentified comparable form
  - †Meristella tumida – tentative report
- †Meristina
- †Mesodouvillina
- †Mesofavosites
- Mesophyllum
  - †Mesophyllum dachsbergi
- †Metadoliolina – tentative report
- †Michelinia
- †Michelinoceras – tentative report
- †Micidus
  - †Micidus stellae
- †Microplasma
- †Miculiella – or unidentified comparable form
- †Mizzia – tentative report
- †Modiolopsis
  - †Modiolopsis modiolaris – or unidentified related form
- †Modiolus – tentative report
- †Modiomorpha
- †Modocia
  - †Modocia compressa – type locality for species
  - †Modocia transversa – type locality for species
- †Moelleritia
  - †Moelleritia canadensis
- †Monadotoechia – tentative report
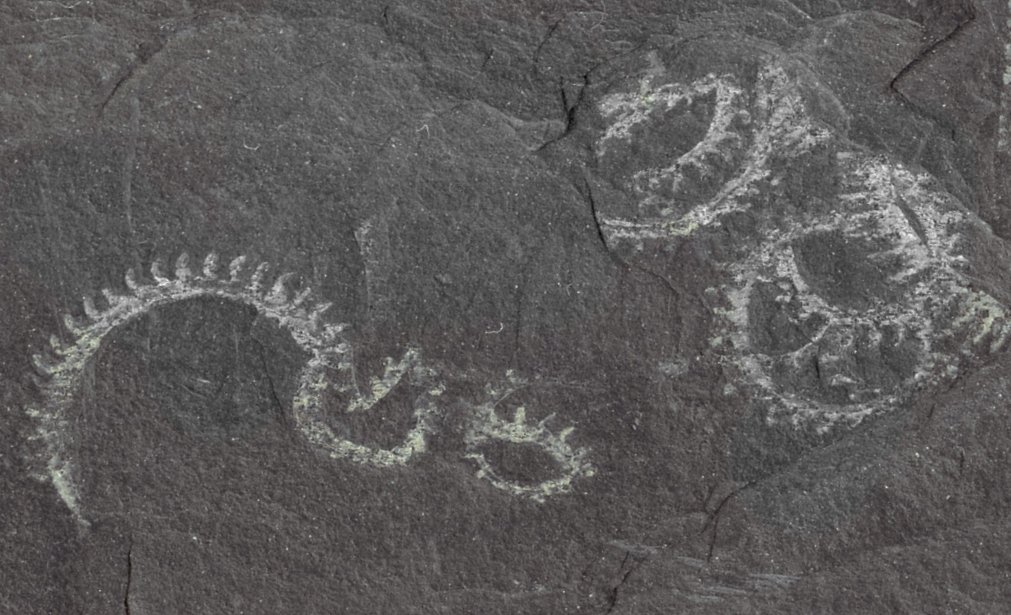
- Fossils of the Early Devonian graptolite Monograptus
  †Monograptus
  - †Monograptus acinaces
  - †Monograptus atavus
  - †Monograptus bohemicus
  - †Monograptus buddingtoni
  - †Monograptus calamistratus
  - †Monograptus clingani – or unidentified related form
  - †Monograptus convolutus
  - †Monograptus crenularis – or unidentified comparable form
  - †Monograptus crinitus
  - †Monograptus cyphus
  - †Monograptus difformis – or unidentified comparable form
  - †Monograptus dubius
  - †Monograptus gregarius
  - †Monograptus incommodus – or unidentified comparable form
  - †Monograptus involutus – or unidentified comparable form
  - †Monograptus nilssoni
  - †Monograptus noyesensis
  - †Monograptus pacificus
  - †Monograptus praedubius – or unidentified related form
  - †Monograptus priodon
  - †Monograptus pseudodubius
  - †Monograptus raitzhainesis – or unidentified related form
  - †Monograptus revolutus
  - †Monograptus scanicus
  - †Monograptus tenuis
  - †Monograptus thomasi – or unidentified related form
  - †Monograptus tumescens
  - †Monograptus uncinatus
  - †Monograptus undulatus
  - †Monograptus varians
  - †Monograptus vulgaris – or unidentified comparable form
  - †Monograptus yukonensis
- †Monolaminospongia – type locality for genus
  - †Monolaminospongia gigantia – type locality for species
- †Monorakos
  - †Monorakos kledos – type locality for species
- †Morania
  - †Morania nixonforkensis – type locality for species
  - †Morania wagneri – type locality for species
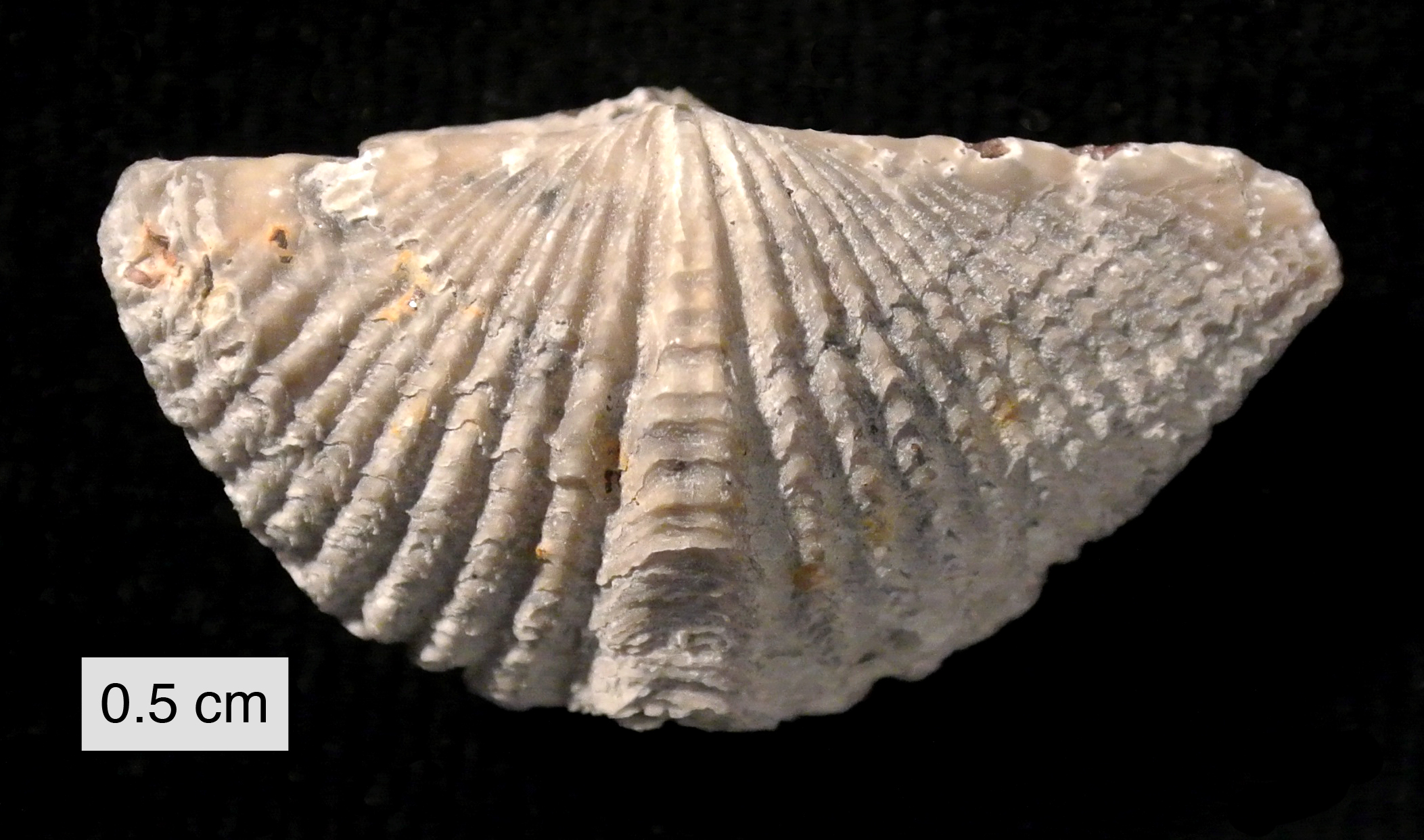
- Fossilized shell of the Devonian brachiopod Mucrospirifer
  †Mucrospirifer
  - †Mucrospirifer refugiensis – type locality for species
- †Multiconus
- †Multisolenia
- †Murchisonia
- †Myalina
- †Myriospirifer
  - †Myriospirifer myriofila – type locality for species
- †Mytilarca
  - †Mytilarca boucoti – type locality for species

== N ==
- †Nankinella
- †Nanochilina
  - †Nanochilina gubanovi – type locality for species
- †Nanukidium
  - †Nanukidium cunninghamensis – or unidentified comparable form
- †Naticella
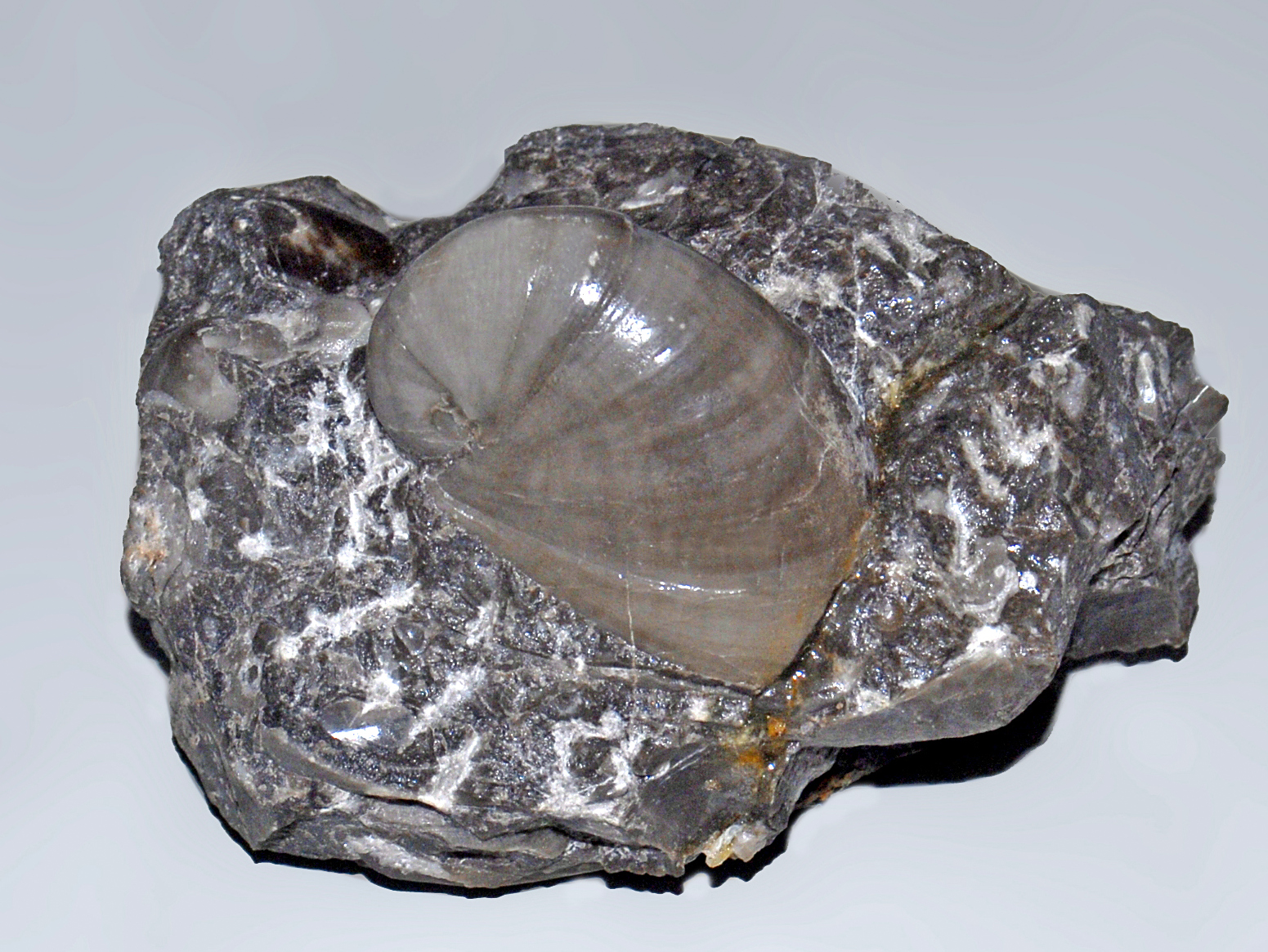
- Fossilized shell of the Early Devonian – Triassic sea snail Naticopsis
  †Naticopsis
  - †Naticopsis bowsheri
  - †Naticopsis carleyana – or unidentified related form
  - †Naticopsis suturicompta
- †Nazarovella
- †Nemagraptus
  - †Nemagraptus gracilis
- †Nematosalpinx
  - †Nematosalpinx dichotomica
  - †Nematosalpinx hormathodes – type locality for species
- †Neochonetes
  - †Neochonetes granulifer – or unidentified related form
- †Neogondolella
  - †Neogondolella idahoensis
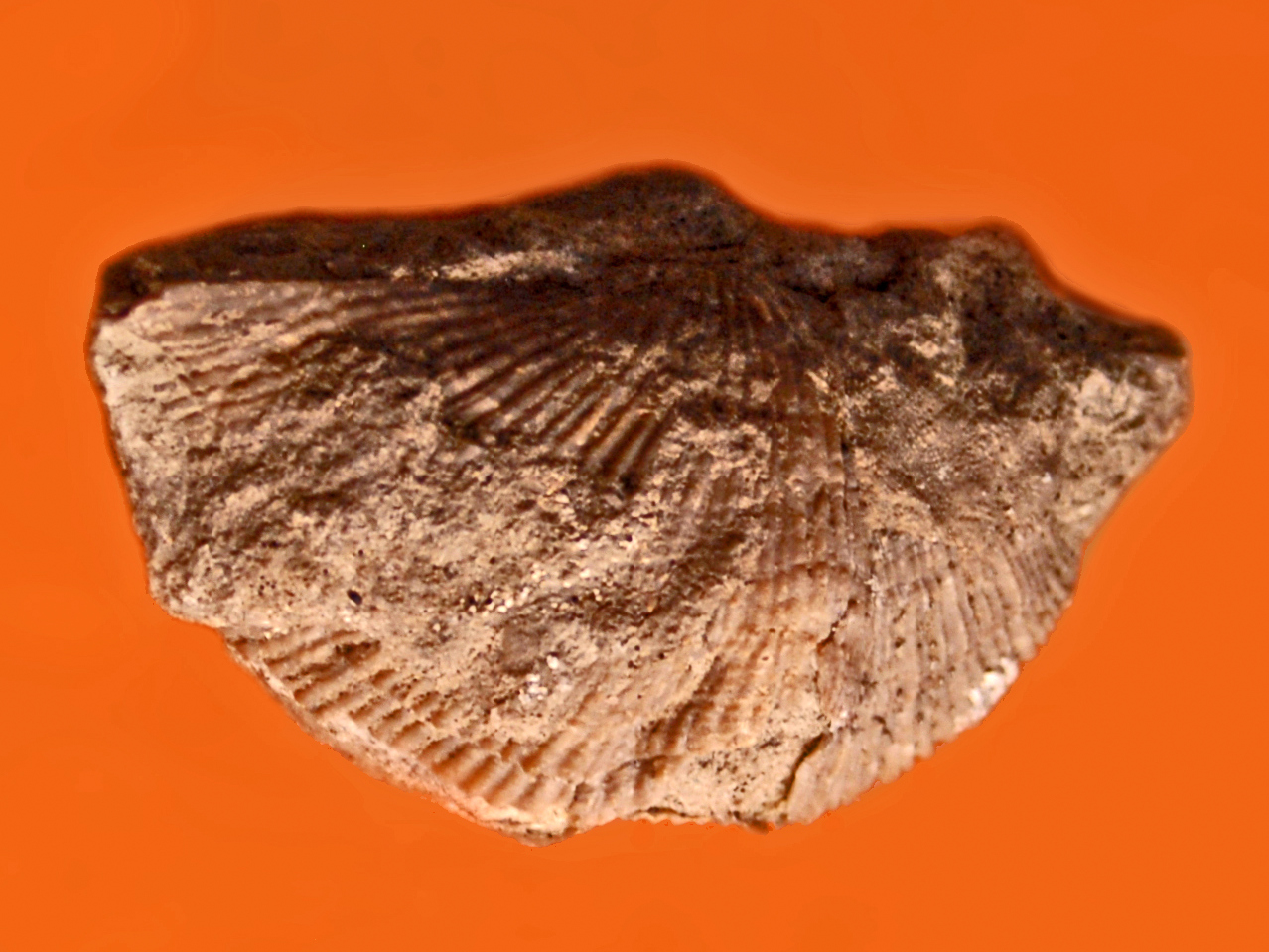
- Fossilized shell of the Carboniferous-Permian brachiopod Neospirifer
  †Neospirifer
  - †Neospirifer cameratus
  - †Neospirifer fasciger – or unidentified related form
  - †Neospirifer striatus – tentative report
- †Nezamyslia
  - †Nezamyslia jucunda – or unidentified related form
- †Nicollidina
  - †Nicollidina brevis
  - †Nicollidina remscheidensis – or unidentified comparable form
- †Nileus
  - †Nileus armadillo
- †Niobella
  - †Niobella kanauguki – type locality for species
- †Nipponophyllum
  - †Nipponophyllum aseptatum – or unidentified comparable form
- †Nodospira – type locality for genus
  - †Nodospira ornata – type locality for species
- †Nordospira
  - †Nordospira vostokovae – type locality for species
- †Nordotoechia – tentative report
- †Nowakia
  - †Nowakia acuaria
  - †Nowakia barrandei
  - †Nowakia parabarrandei – type locality for species
- †Nucleospira
  - †Nucleospira hecetensis
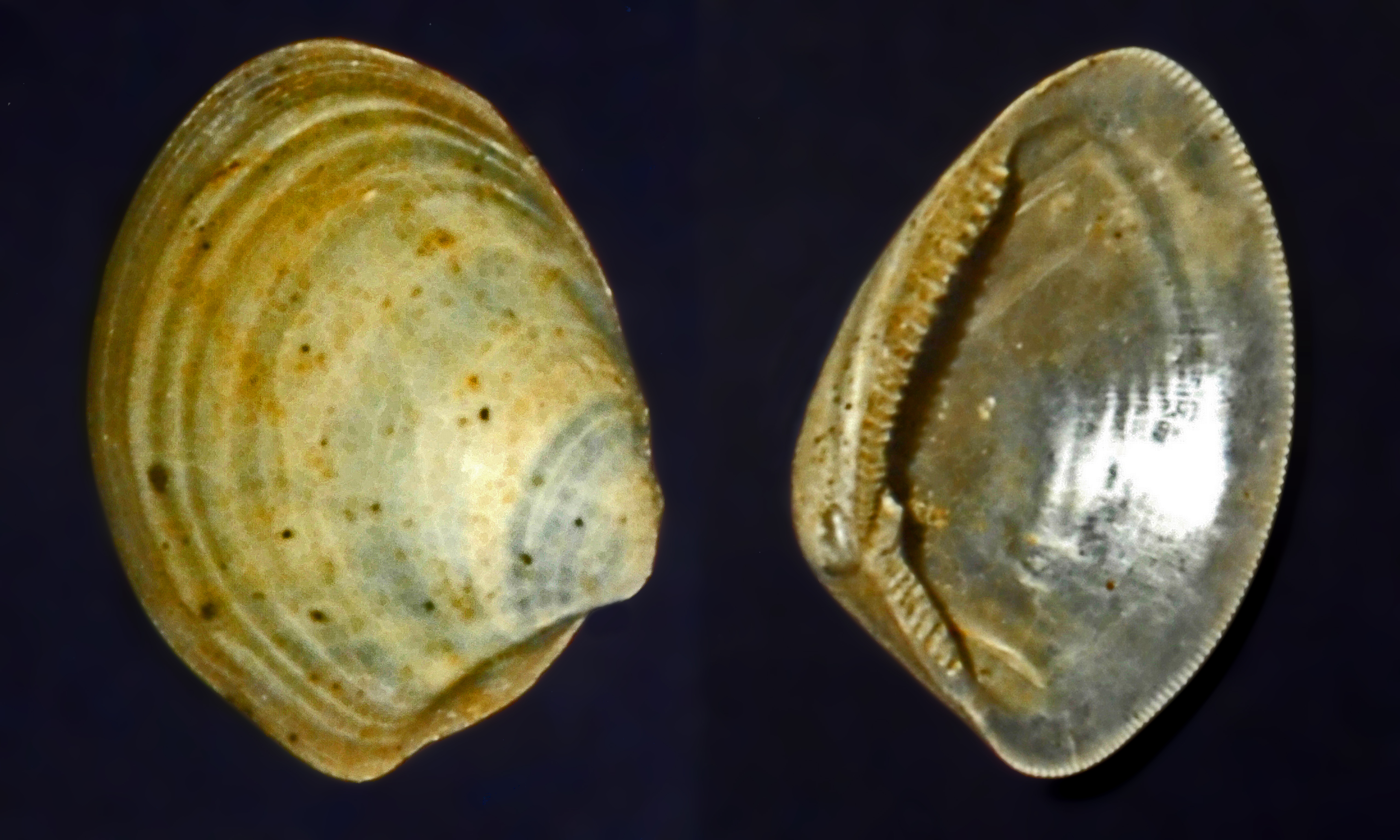
- Interior of a fossilized shell of the Early Ordovician-modern marine bivalve Nucula
  Nucula
  - †Nucula shumardiana – or unidentified related form
- Nuculana – tentative report
- †Nuculites

== O ==
- †Oanduporella
  - †Oanduporella kuskokwimensis
- †Odontomaria
  - †Odontomaria cheeneetnukensis – type locality for species
- †Odontospirifer
- †Oistodus
  - †Oistodus parallelus
  - †Oistodus venustus – or unidentified comparable form
- †Olenaspella
  - †Olenaspella evansi
- †Oncagnostus
  - †Oncagnostus tumidosus
- †Onchonotopsis
  - †Onchonotopsis occidentalis – type locality for species
- †Oonoceras
- †Opsiconidion
- †Orbiculoidea
- †Orecopia
  - †Orecopia mccoyi – or unidentified comparable form
- †Oriostoma
  - †Oriostoma angulatum – or unidentified comparable form
  - †Oriostoma princeps
- †Orthis
  - †Orthis arcuata – or unidentified comparable form
- †Orthoceras
  - †Orthoceras anguliferas – or unidentified comparable form
- †Orthograptus
  - †Orthograptus bellulus
  - †Orthograptus calcaratus
  - †Orthograptus eberleini
  - †Orthograptus insectiformis
  - †Orthograptus mutabilis – or unidentified comparable form
  - †Orthograptus quadrimucronatus
  - †Orthograptus truncatus
  - †Orthograptus vesiculosus
- †Orthonota
- †Orthonychia
- †Orthophyllum – tentative report
- †Orthotetes
  - †Orthotetes chemungensis – or unidentified comparable form
  - †Orthotetes crenistria
  - †Orthotetes keokuk – or unidentified related form
- †Orthotichia – tentative report
  - †Orthotichia morganiana – or unidentified related form
- †Ortonia – tentative report
- †Oulodus
- †Overtonia – tentative report
  - †Overtonia fimbriata – or unidentified related form
- †Ozarkodina
  - †Ozarkodina confluens
  - †Ozarkodina eberleini – type locality for species
  - †Ozarkodina paucidentata – or unidentified comparable form

== P ==
- †Pachyfavosites
- †Pachyphloia
- †Pachypora
- †Pachystrophia
  - †Pachystrophia devexa – or unidentified comparable form
  - †Pachystrophia gotlandicus
- †Paeckelmanella
  - †Paeckelmanella dieneri – or unidentified related form
- †Paffrathopsis
  - †Paffrathopsis nana – or unidentified related form
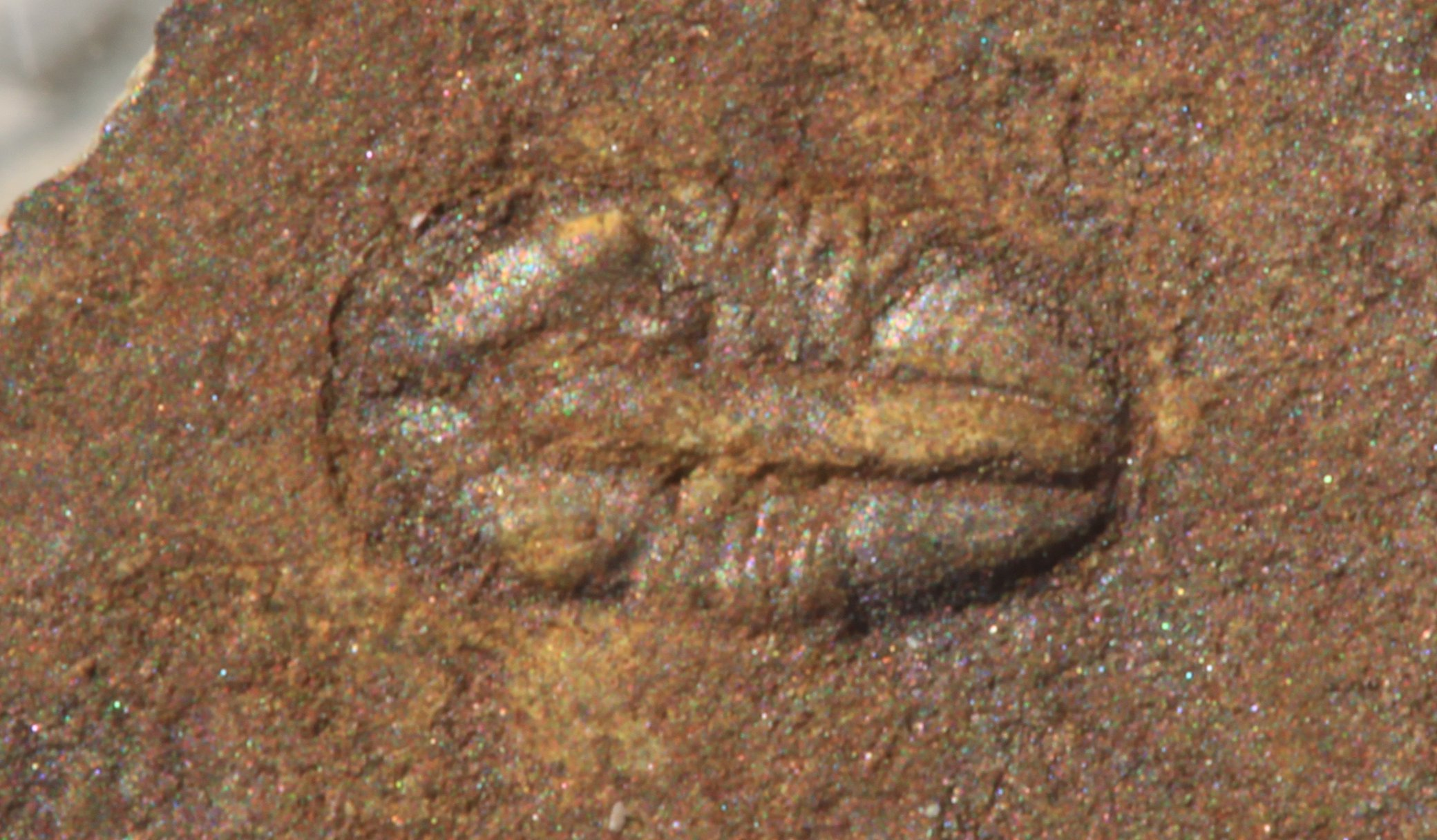
- Fossil of the Cambrian trilobite Pagetia
  †Pagetia
- †Palaeolima
  - †Palaeolima retifera – or unidentified related form
- †Palaeophyllum – or unidentified comparable form
- †Palaeoscheda
  - †Palaeoscheda crassimuralis
- †Palaeowingella – type locality for genus
  - †Palaeowingella farewellensis – type locality for species
- †Palaeozygopleura
- †Paleofavosites
- †Paleoxyphostylus
  - †Paleoxyphostylus variospina
- †Palliseria
  - †Palliseria robusta
- †Panderodus
  - †Panderodus gracllis – or unidentified comparable form
- †Pandorinellina
  - †Pandorinellina exigna
  - †Pandorinellina exigua
  - †Pandorinellina expansa
  - †Pandorinellina steinhornensis
- †Panenka
- †Paracybantyx
  - †Paracybantyx occidentalis – type locality for species
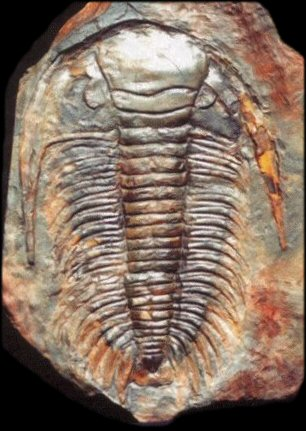
- Fossil of the Cambrian trilobite Paradoxides
  †Paradoxides
- †Parafusulina – tentative report
- †Paraglossograptus
  - †Paraglossograptus tentaculatus – or unidentified comparable form
- †Paraliospira
  - †Paraliospira angulata
  - †Paraliospira mundula
  - †Paraliospira planata – or unidentified related form
- †Parallelodon
- †Paraparchites
  - †Paraparchites carbonarius – or unidentified related form
- †Paraphillipsia
  - †Paraphillipsia aglypta – type locality for species
- †Parapugnax
  - †Parapugnax schmidti
- †Pararachnastraea
  - †Pararachnastraea gracilis – or unidentified related form
- †Parasolenopleura
- †Parastriatopora
- †Parawedekindellina
  - †Parawedekindellina pechorica – or unidentified comparable form
- †Parehmania
  - †Parehmania lata – or unidentified comparable form
- †Parisograptus
  - †Parisograptus caduceus
- †Paronaella – tentative report
  - †Paronaella triporosa
- †Paupospira
  - †Paupospira burginensis – or unidentified comparable form
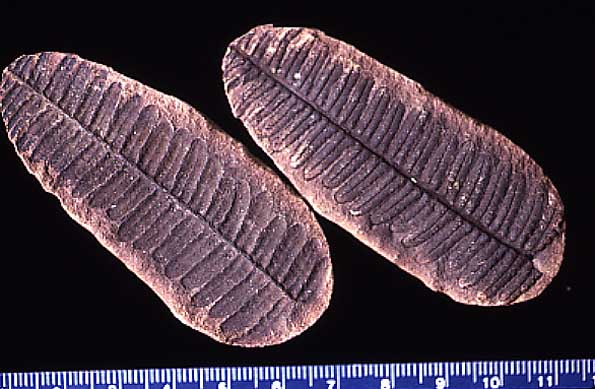
- Fossils of the Late Devonian-Permian fern-like fronds Pecopteris
  †Pecopteris
  - †Pecopteris arborescens
  - †Pecopteris hemitelioides
  - †Pecopteris unita
- †Pedderia – type locality for genus
  - †Pedderia fragosa – type locality for species
- †Pelekysgnathus
  - †Pelekysgnathus klamathensis
- †Pelypora
- †Peneckiella
- †Penekiella
- †Pentamerella
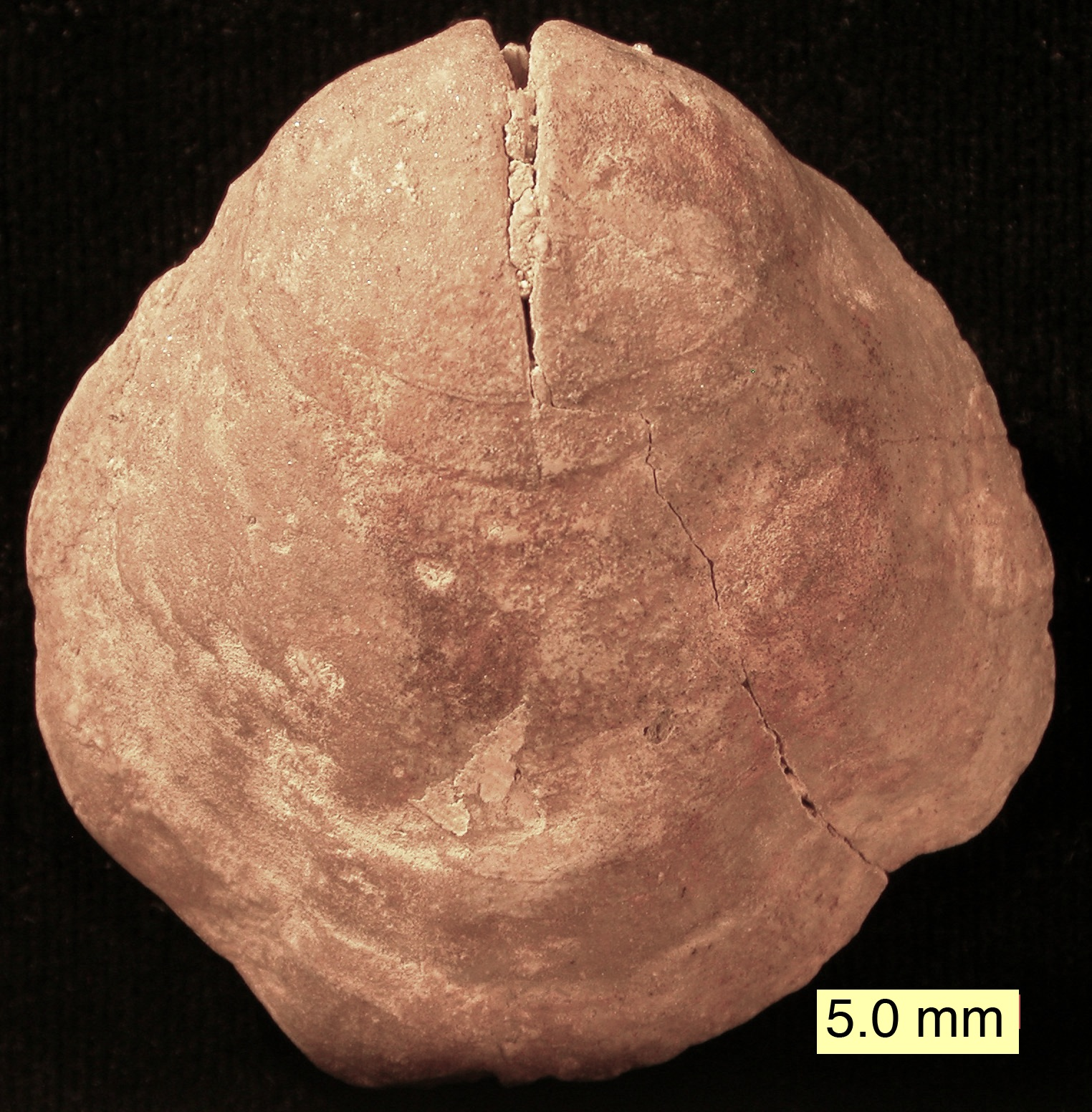
- Fossilized shell of the Silurian-Middle Devonian brachiopod Pentamerus
  †Pentamerus
- †Peridon
  - †Peridon aculeatus
- †Perimecocoelia
  - †Perimecocoelia semicostata
- †Permophricodothyris
  - †Permophricodothyris nodosa – or unidentified comparable form
- †Pernipecten
- †Pernopecten
  - †Pernopecten aviculatus – or unidentified related form
  - †Pernopecten ohioensis – or unidentified related form
- †Peronopsis
  - †Peronopsis gaspensis – or unidentified comparable form
- †Petalograptus
  - †Petalograptus minor
  - †Petalograptus palmeus
- †Petrozium
- †Phacellophyllum
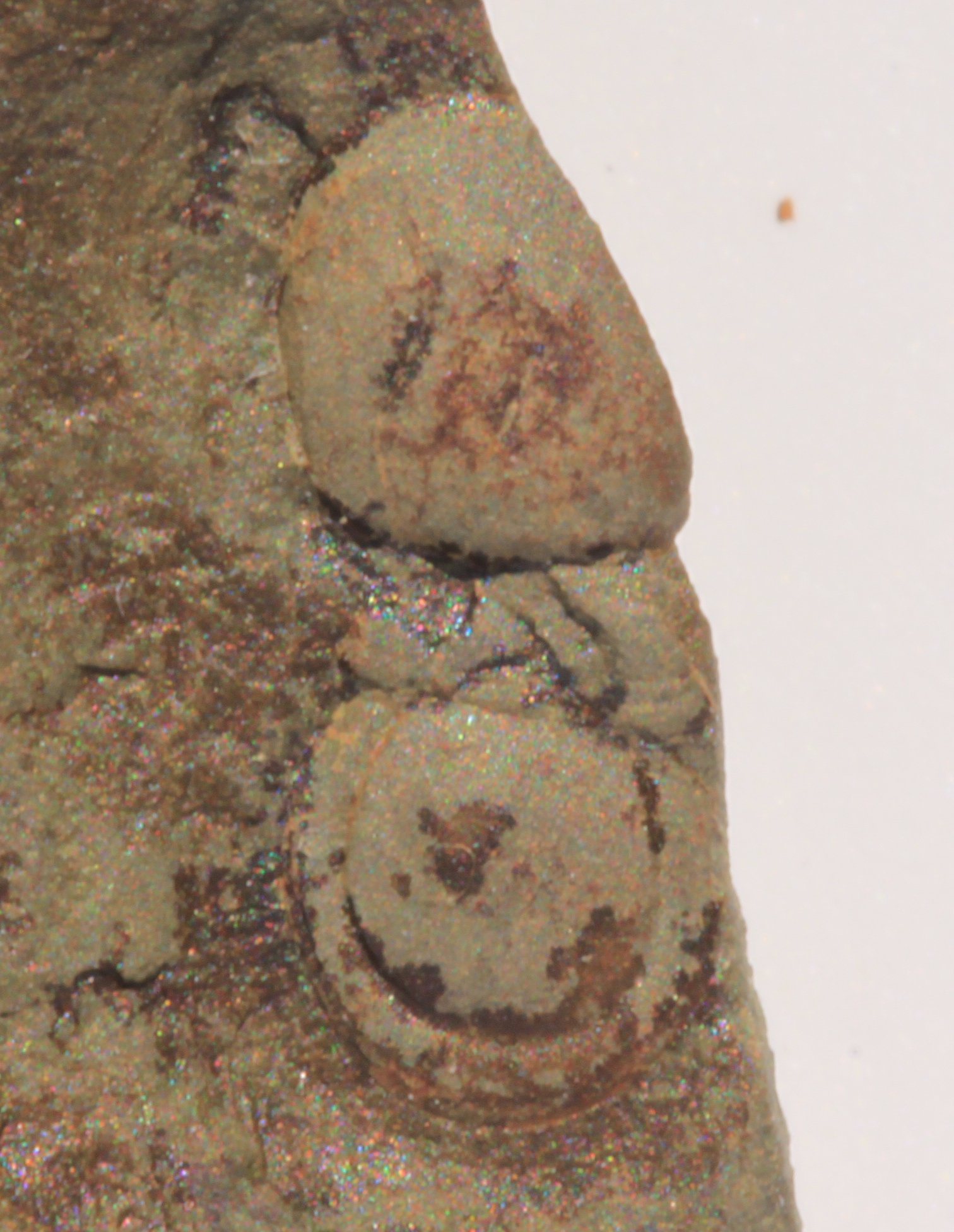
- Fossil of the Cambrian trilobite Phalagnostus
  †Phalagnostus
  - †Phalagnostus bituberculatus
- †Phanerotrema
- †Phaulactis
  - †Phaulactis angusta – or unidentified comparable form
  - †Phaulactis cyathophylloides – or unidentified comparable form
- †Phillipsastrea
- †Phillipsia
  - †Phillipsia bufo – tentative report
  - †Phillipsia majus – type locality for species
  - †Phillipsia megalopos – type locality for species
- †Pholadostrophia – tentative report
- †Pholidocidaris
- †Phragmodus
- †Phragmorthis
  - †Phragmorthis buttsi
- †Phricodothyris
  - †Phricodothyris guadalupensis – or unidentified related form
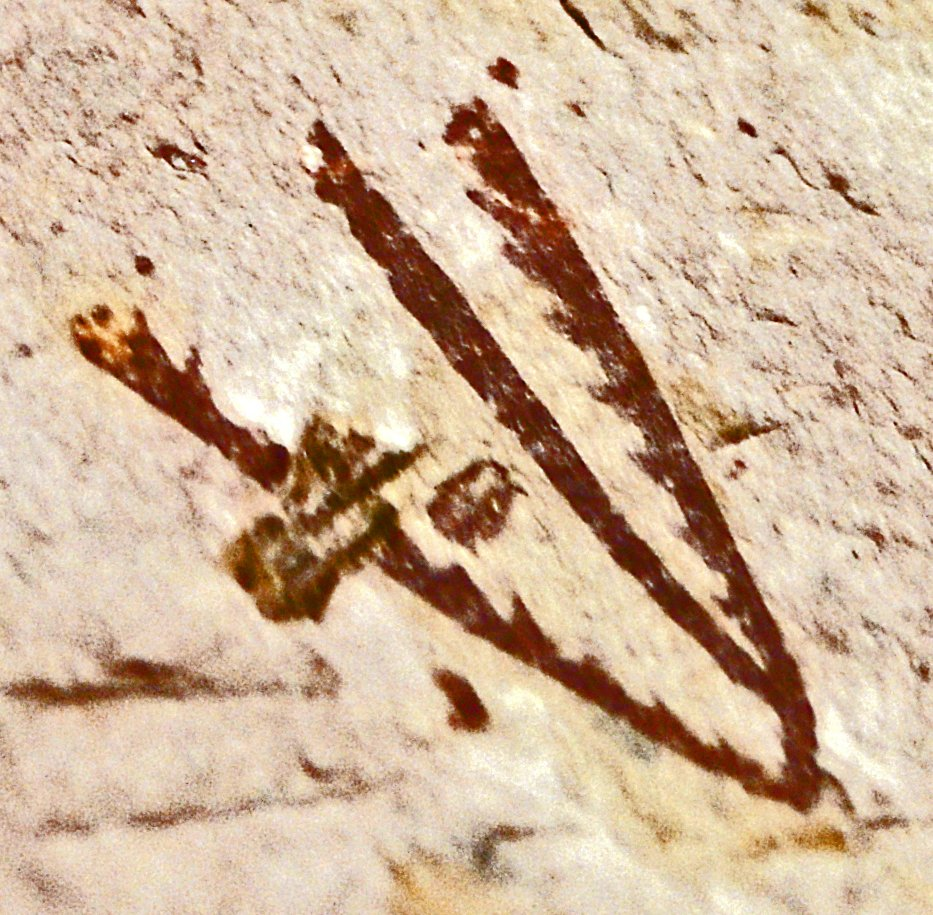
- Fossil of the Early Ordovician graptolite Phyllograptus
  †Phyllograptus
  - †Phyllograptus anna – or unidentified comparable form
- †Phylloporella – tentative report
- †Pinacites
  - †Pinacites jugleri
- †Pinegathyris – report made of unidentified related form or using admittedly obsolete nomenclature
  - †Pinegathyris royssiana – or unidentified related form
- †Pinna
- †Pinnatopora
- †Plagioglypta
- †Planitrochus
- †Plasmophyllum
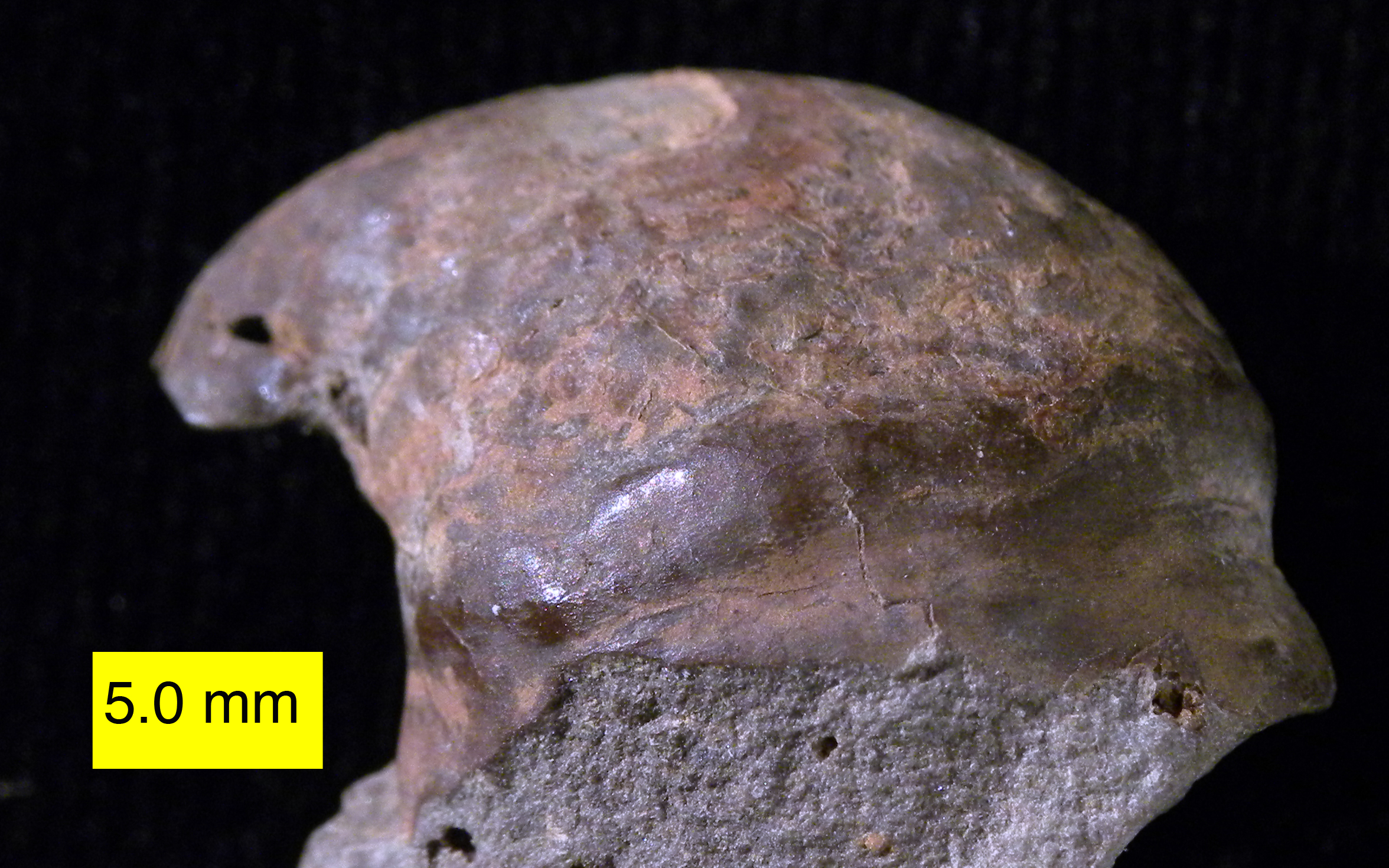
- Fossilized shell of the Silurian-Early Triassic sea snail Platyceras
  †Platyceras
- †Platycrinites
  - †Platycrinites nikondaense – type locality for species
- †Platycrinus
- †Platyschisma – tentative report
- Pleurotomaria
- †Plicogypa
  - †Plicogypa kayseri – or unidentified comparable form
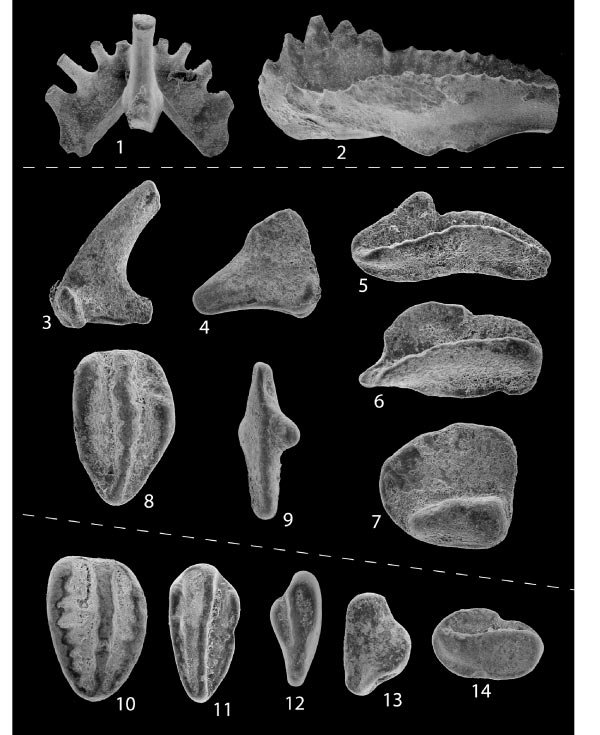
- Various conodont elements, including those of Polygnathus (specimens 8, 10, and 11)
  †Polygnathus
  - †Polygnathus alexanderensis
  - †Polygnathus angusticostatus
  - †Polygnathus angustipennatus
  - †Polygnathus aspelundi
  - †Polygnathus borealis
  - †Polygnathus brevis
  - †Polygnathus churkini
  - †Polygnathus costatus
  - †Polygnathus eberleini
  - †Polygnathus eiflius
  - †Polygnathus inversus
  - †Polygnathus kennettensis
  - †Polygnathus linguiformis
  - †Polygnathus pacificus
  - †Polygnathus parawebbi
  - †Polygnathus perbonus – or unidentified related form
  - †Polygnathus praetrigonicus
  - †Polygnathus pseudofoliatus
  - †Polygnathus robusticostatus
  - †Polygnathus samueli
  - †Polygnathus sinuosus
  - †Polygnathus trigonicus
  - †Polygnathus unicornis
  - †Polygnathus xylus
- †Polyplacospongia – type locality for genus
  - †Polyplacospongia nodosa – type locality for species
- †Polypora
- †Polythalamia
  - †Polythalamia americana
- †Prampyx
  - †Prampyx difformis
- †Prioniodina
  - †Prioniodina flabellum
- †Prisochiton
- †Proampyx
  - †Proampyx acuminatus
- †Prodentalium
- †Productella
  - †Productella hallana
- †Productus
  - †Productus burlingtonesis – or unidentified related form
  - †Productus gallatinenesis – or unidentified related form
  - †Productus giganteus
  - †Productus gruenwaldti – or unidentified related form
  - †Productus hirsutiformis
  - †Productus inflatus – or unidentified related form
  - †Productus jakovlevi – or unidentified related form
  - †Productus longus – or unidentified related form
  - †Productus mesialis – or unidentified related form
  - †Productus ovatus – tentative report
  - †Productus sampsoni – or unidentified related form
  - †Productus samsoni – or unidentified related form
  - †Productus setiger – or unidentified related form
  - †Productus striatus – or unidentified related form
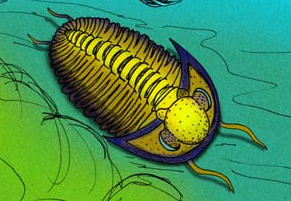
- Restoration of the Silurian trilobite Proetus
  †Proetus
  - †Proetus romanooski
- †Prohedinia
  - †Prohedinia brevifrons
- †Protathyris
  - †Protathyris pacificana
- †Proteoceras
  - †Proteoceras obliquum
  - †Proteoceras tubulara
- †Protolonsdaleiastraea
  - †Protolonsdaleiastraea cargalensis – or unidentified related form
- †Protowentzelella
  - †Protowentzelella cystosa
- †Pseudagnostus
  - †Pseudagnostus communis
- †Pseudamplexus
  - †Pseudamplexus princeps – or unidentified comparable form
- †Pseudoalbaillella
  - †Pseudoalbaillella longicornis – or unidentified related form
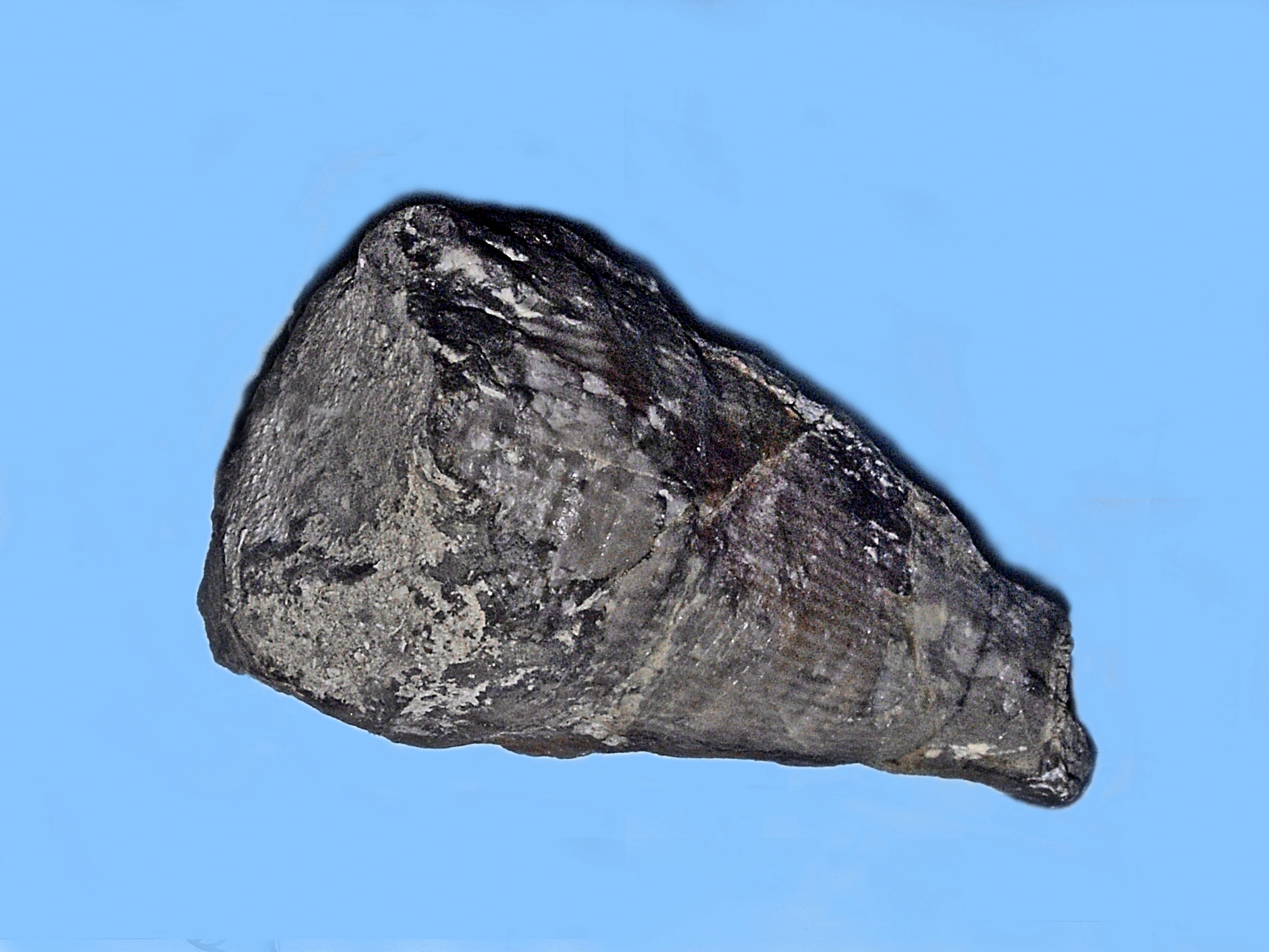
- Fossil of the Silurian-Devonian horn coral Pseudoamplexus
  †Pseudoamplexus
  - †Pseudoamplexus altaicus
- †Pseudobelodina
  - †Pseudobelodina adentata – or unidentified comparable form
  - †Pseudobelodina vulgaris – or unidentified related form
- †Pseudobornia
  - †Pseudobornia ursina
- †Pseudoclimacograptus
  - †Pseudoclimacograptus marathonensis – or unidentified comparable form
  - †Pseudoclimacograptus scharenbergi
  - †Pseudoclimacograptus undulatus – or unidentified comparable form
- †Pseudocryptaenia – tentative report
  - †Pseudocryptaenia majewskwi – type locality for species
- †Pseudodoliolina
  - †Pseudodoliolina oliviformis
- †Pseudofusulinella
  - †Pseudofusulinella praeantiqua – or unidentified comparable form
- †Pseudoharttina
  - †Pseudoharttina kayi – type locality for species
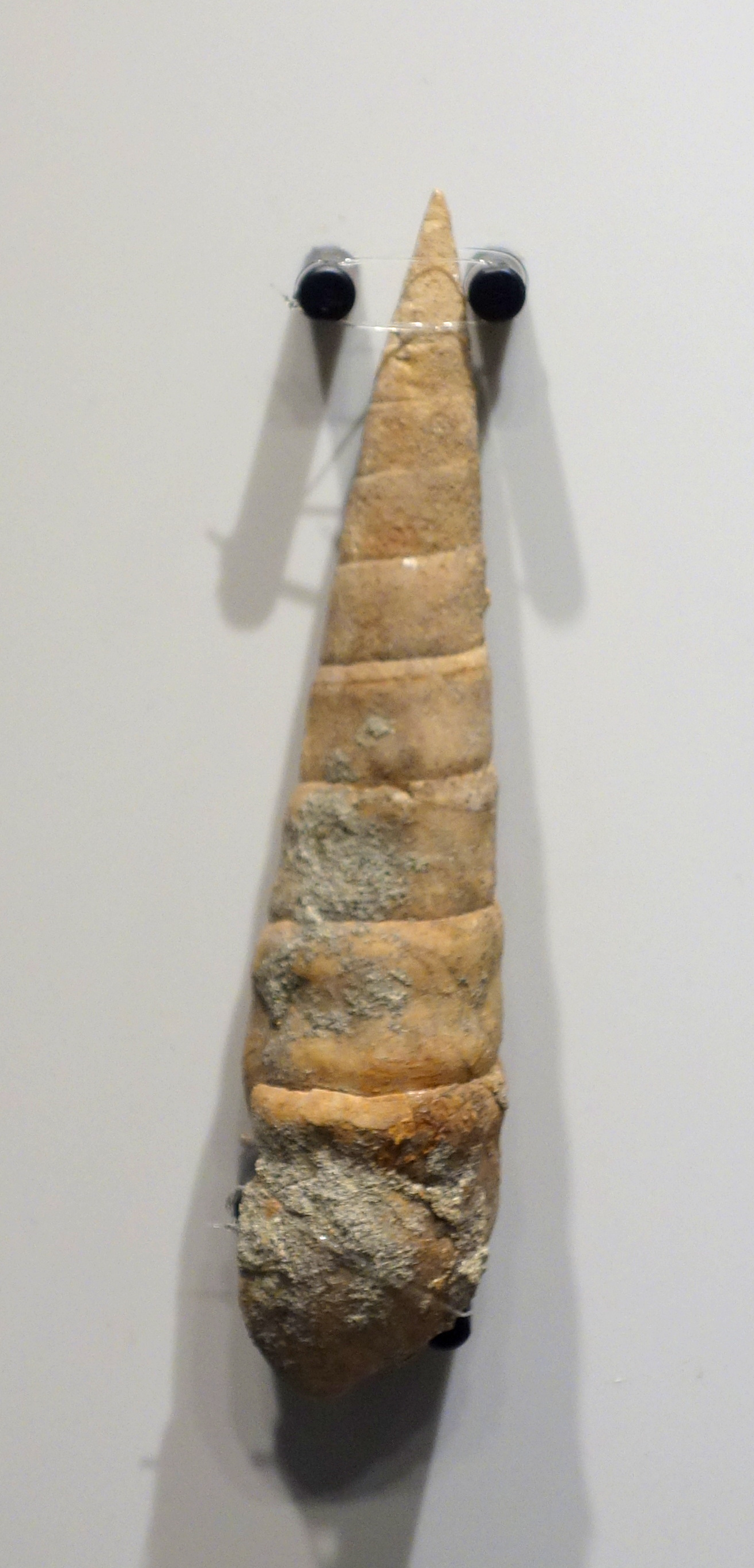
- Fossilized shell of a Pseudomelania sea snail
  †Pseudomelania
- †Pseudomicroplasma – report made of unidentified related form or using admittedly obsolete nomenclature
- †Pseudomonotis – tentative report
- †Pseudomphalotrochus
  - †Pseudomphalotrochus linsleyi
- †Pseudophillipsia – tentative report
- †Pseudophorus
  - †Pseudophorus profundus – or unidentified comparable form
- †Pseudoporefieldia
  - †Pseudoporefieldia micella
- †Pseudotryplamsa – tentative report
  - †Pseudotryplamsa altaica – or unidentified comparable form
- †Pseudotryplasma
  - †Pseudotryplasma altaica – or unidentified comparable form
  - †Pseudotryplasma altaicus – or unidentified comparable form
- †Psilocamara
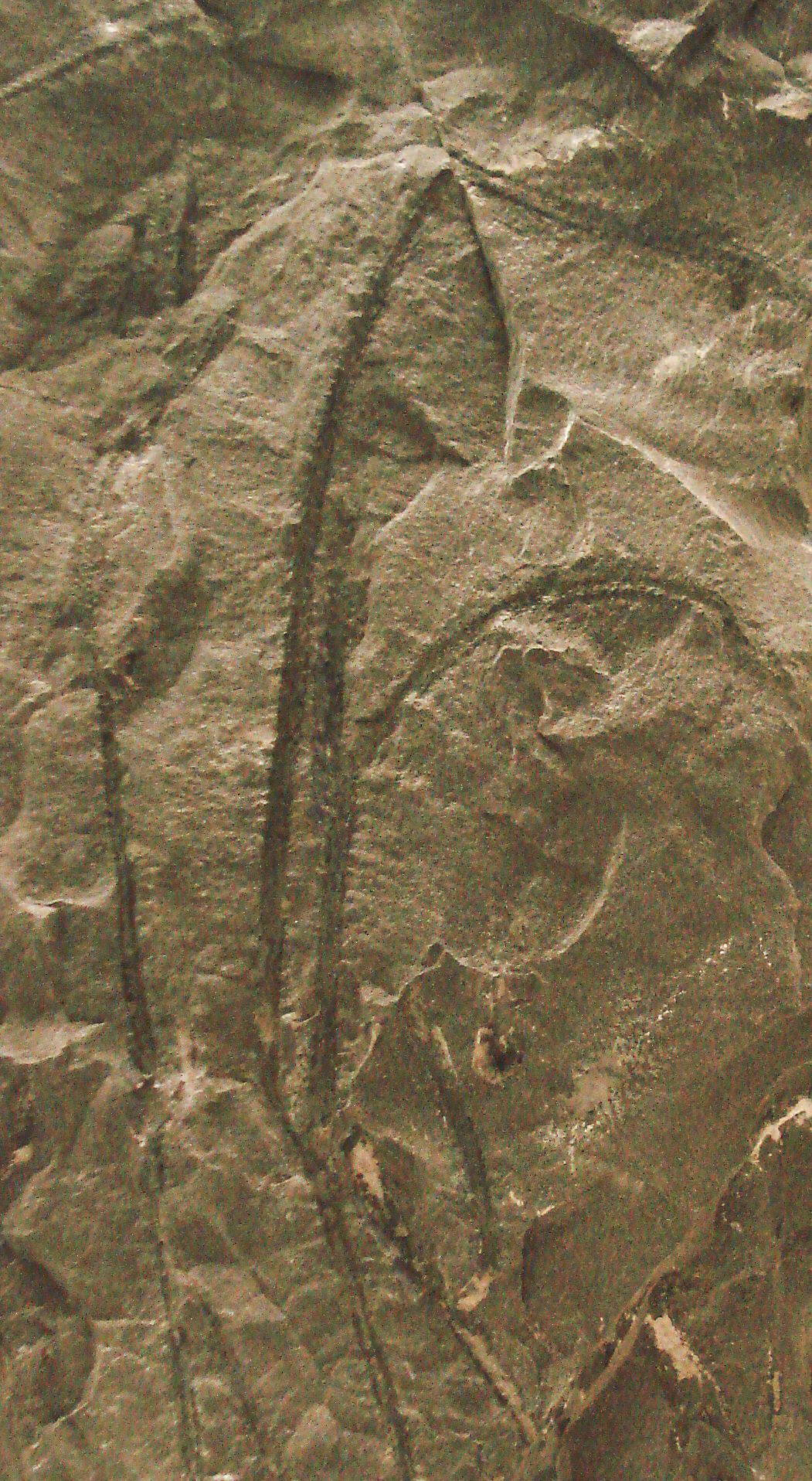
- Fossil of the primitive Devonian vascular plant Psilophyton
  †Psilophyton
- †Pteria – report made of unidentified related form or using admittedly obsolete nomenclature
- †Pterinea
- †Pterinopecten
- †Pterocephalia
  - †Pterocephalia constricta – type locality for species
- †Pterospirifer
  - †Pterospirifer alatus
- †Ptychagnostus
  - †Ptychagnostus aculeatus
  - †Ptychagnostus puncturosus
- †Ptychoglyptus
  - †Ptychoglyptus alaensis – type locality for species
  - †Ptychoglyptus pauciradiatus
- †Ptychomphalina
- †Ptychophyllum
- †Ptychopleurella
  - †Ptychopleurella uniplicata
- †Pugnax
  - †Pugnax pugnus
  - †Pugnax utah – or unidentified related form
- †Pulchratia – tentative report
- †Purdonella – report made of unidentified related form or using admittedly obsolete nomenclature
  - †Purdonella nikitini – or unidentified related form
- †Pustula
  - †Pustula alternata – or unidentified related form
  - †Pustula biseriata – or unidentified related form
  - †Pustula blairi – or unidentified related form
  - †Pustula carringtoniana – or unidentified related form
  - †Pustula concentrica – or unidentified related form
  - †Pustula distorta – or unidentified related form
  - †Pustula eximia – or unidentified related form
  - †Pustula indianensis – or unidentified related form
  - †Pustula irginae – or unidentified related form
  - †Pustula magnituberculata – or unidentified related form
  - †Pustula millespinosa – or unidentified related form
  - †Pustula morbilliana – or unidentified related form
  - †Pustula nikitini – or unidentified related form
  - †Pustula pilosa – or unidentified related form
  - †Pustula plicatilis – or unidentified related form
  - †Pustula pseudaculeata – or unidentified related form
  - †Pustula punctata
  - †Pustula rugata – or unidentified related form
  - †Pustula semicostata – or unidentified related form
  - †Pustula spinulosa – or unidentified related form
  - †Pustula subhorrida – or unidentified related form
  - †Pustula tuberculata – or unidentified related form
  - †Pustula wallaciana – or unidentified related form
  - †Pustula wallacianus – or unidentified related form
- †Pycnactis – tentative report
- †Pycnolithus – tentative report
- †Pylentonema
  - †Pylentonema antiqua – or unidentified comparable form

== Q ==
- †Quadricarina
  - †Quadricarina noklebergi – type locality for species
- †Quasifusulina
  - †Quasifusulina longissima – or unidentified related form
- †Quebecaspis
  - †Quebecaspis aspinosa – type locality for species
  - †Quebecaspis conifrons – tentative report

== R ==
- †Rachiopteris
- †Raphistoma – tentative report
  - †Raphistoma alaskensis – type locality for species
- †Raphistomina
  - †Raphistomina rugata – or unidentified comparable form
- †Rastrites
  - †Rastrites longispinus – or unidentified comparable form
  - †Rastrites peregrinus – or unidentified related form
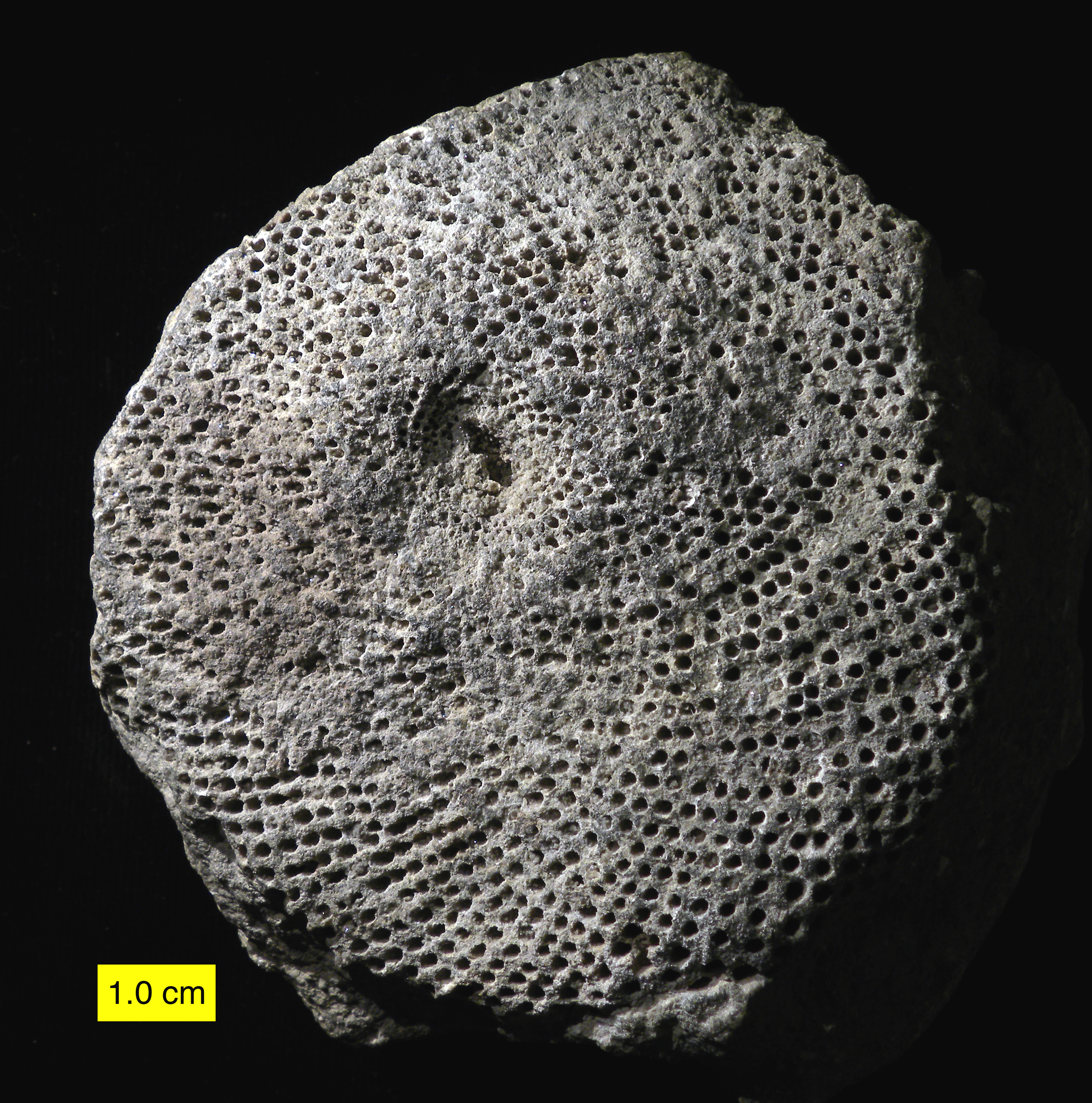
- Fossil of the Early Ordovician-Permian benthic alga Receptaculites
  †Receptaculites
- †Rectograptus
  - †Rectograptus amplexicaulis
- †Remipyga
- †Renalcis
  - †Renalcis tuberculatus – or unidentified comparable form
- †Reteograptus
  - †Reteograptus geinitzianus
- †Reticularia
  - †Reticularia setigera – or unidentified related form
- †Reticulariopsis
  - †Reticulariopsis bicollina
- †Retiolites
  - †Retiolites geinitzianus
- †Retispira
  - †Retispira sullivani
- †Reuschia
- †Rhabdomeson
- †Rhabdostropha
  - †Rhabdostropha primitiva
- †Rhaphidophyllum
- †Rhenozyga
  - †Rhenozyga reifenstuhli – type locality for species
- †Rhineoderma – tentative report
  - †Rhineoderma wortheni – or unidentified related form
- †Rhipidomella
  - †Rhipidomella carbonaria – or unidentified related form
  - †Rhipidomella nevadensis – or unidentified related form
  - †Rhipidomella uralica – or unidentified related form
- †Rhizophyllum
  - †Rhizophyllum schischkaticum
- †Rhombopora
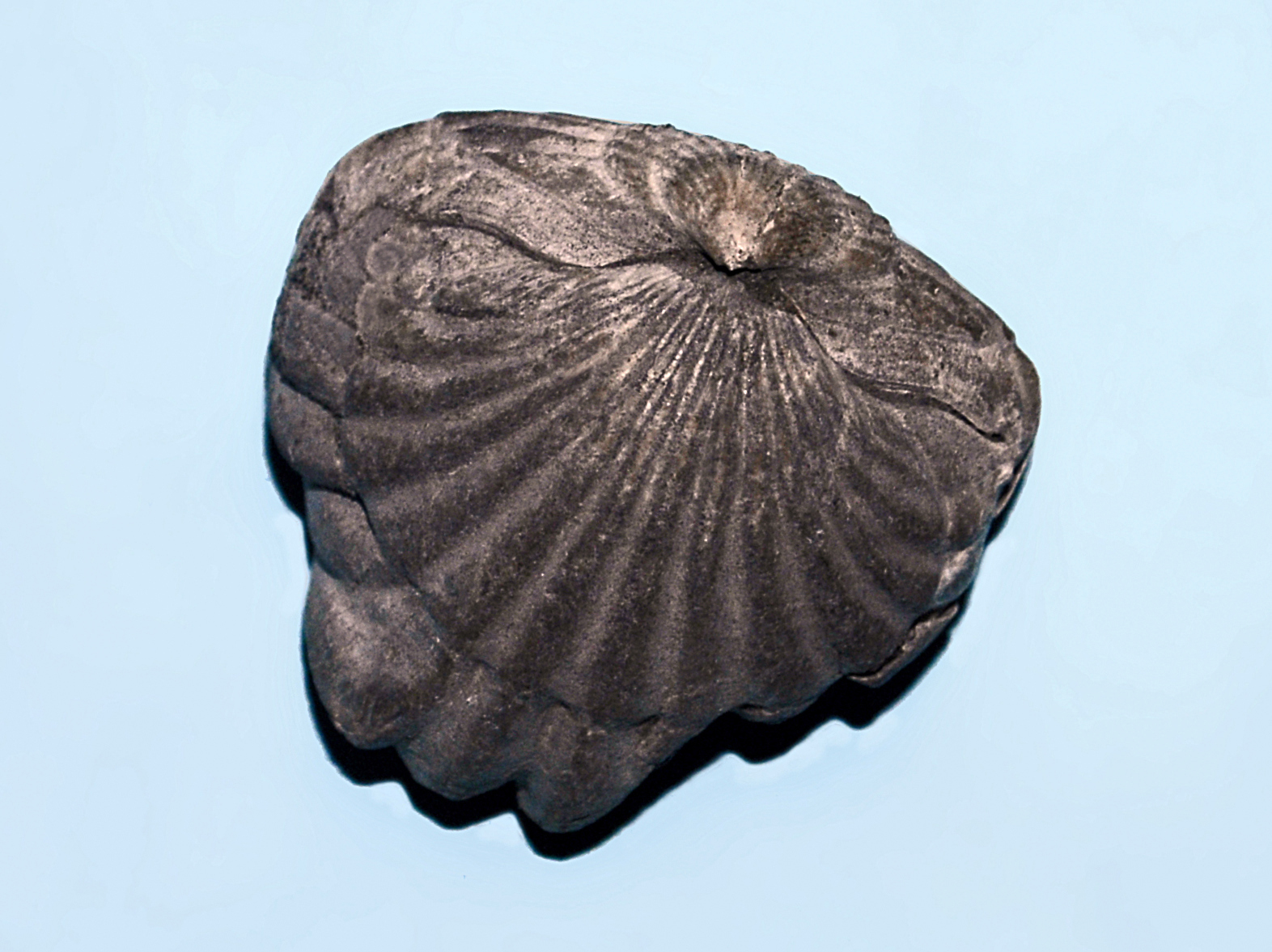
- Fossilized shell of the Silurian-Eocene articulate brachiopod Rhynchonella
  †Rhynchonella
  - †Rhynchonella amalthea – or unidentified comparable form
  - †Rhynchonella livonica
- †Rhynchopora
  - †Rhynchopora beecheri – or unidentified related form
  - †Rhynchopora geinitziana – or unidentified related form
  - †Rhynchopora kochi – or unidentified comparable form
  - †Rhynchopora nikitini – or unidentified related form
- †Rhytiodentalium
  - †Rhytiodentalium kentuckyensis – or unidentified comparable form
- †Richardsonella
- †Richthofenia
  - †Richthofenia lawrenciana – or unidentified related form
- †Rigbyetia
  - †Rigbyetia obconica
- †Roadoceras
  - †Roadoceras roadense – or unidentified comparable form
- †Roemeria – or unidentified comparable form
- †Rothpletzella
  - †Rothpletzella gotlandica
- †Rousseauspira
  - †Rousseauspira teicherti
- †Rugaltarostrum
  - †Rugaltarostrum congregabile – type locality for species
- †Rugatia
  - †Rugatia occidentalis – or unidentified related form
- †Rugivestis
  - †Rugivestis girtyi – type locality for species
- †Rugosatrypa
  - †Rugosatrypa flexibilis

== S ==
- †Saffordophyllum
- †Salairophyllum
- †Sanguinolites
- †Sannemannia
  - †Sannemannia glenisteri – or unidentified related form
- †Sarcinula
- †Savagerhynchus – type locality for genus
  - †Savagerhynchus hecetaensis – type locality for species
- †Scalites
  - †Scalites tellerensis – type locality for species
- †Scaphina – tentative report
- †Scaphorthis
  - †Scaphorthis virginiensis
- †Scharfenbergia
  - †Scharfenbergia concentrica
  - †Scharfenbergia impella
  - †Scharfenbergia ruestae
  - †Scharfenbergia tailleurense
- †Scharyia
- †Schizodus
- †Schizophoria
  - †Schizophoria fragilis – or unidentified comparable form
  - †Schizophoria macfarlani
  - †Schizophoria striatula
  - †Schizophoria swallowi – or unidentified related form
- †Schizoproetoides – tentative report
- †Schmidtella
- †Schrenkiella
  - †Schrenkiella schrenki – or unidentified comparable form
- †Schuchertella
- †Schwagerina
  - †Schwagerina jenkinsi – or unidentified comparable form
- †Sciophyllum
  - †Sciophyllum alaskaensis
  - †Sciophyllum lambarti
- †Scotoharpes
  - †Scotoharpes raaschi – or unidentified related form
- †Semicoccinium – tentative report
- †Semicyclus
  - †Semicyclus brabbi
- †Semisphaerocephalus
  - †Semisphaerocephalus latus – type locality for species
- †Septabrunsiina
- †Septacamera
  - †Septacamera kutorgae
  - †Septacamera opitula – tentative report
  - †Septacamera pybensis – type locality for species
  - †Septacamera stupenda – type locality for species
- †Septaglomospiranella
- †Septimyalina
  - †Septimyalina perattenuata – or unidentified related form
- †Septopora – tentative report
- †Serpulospira
- †Shumardella
  - †Shumardella missouriensis
- †Sibirirhynchia
  - †Sibirirhynchia alata
- †Sibiritia
- †Sibiritoechia – tentative report
  - †Sibiritoechia sylvia
- †Sieberella
- †Sigmocheilus – tentative report
  - †Sigmocheilus compressus – type locality for species
- †Sinutropis
  - †Sinutropis esthetica – type locality for species
  - †Sinutropis spiralis – type locality for species
- †Siphonophrentis – tentative report
- †Siskiyouspira
- †Skenidioides
  - †Skenidioides multifarius
- †Smithiphyllum
- †Sociophyllum
  - †Sociophyllum glomerulatum – or unidentified comparable form
- †Solenopleura
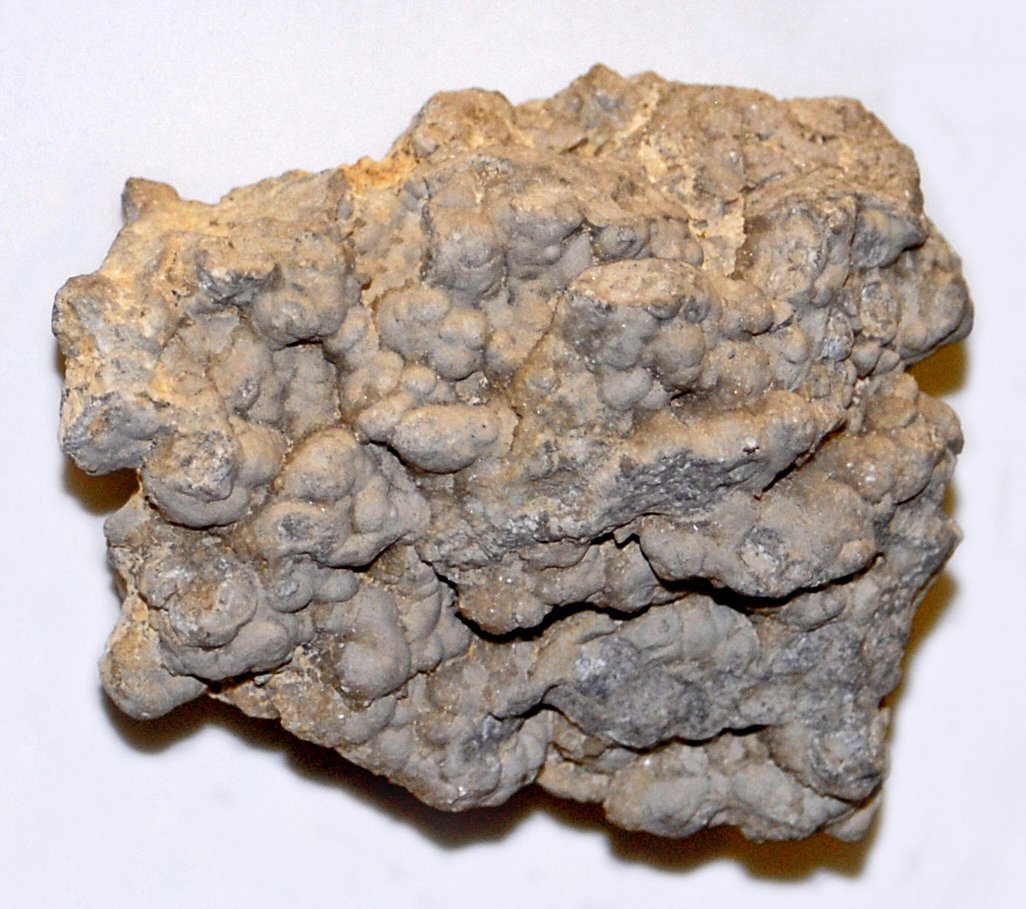
- Fossils of the red alga Solenopora
  †Solenopora
  - †Solenopora compacta
  - †Solenopora filiformis
- †Solenopsis – tentative report
- †Sowerbina
  - †Sowerbina timanica – or unidentified comparable form
- †Sowerbyella
  - †Sowerbyella praecursor – type locality for species
  - †Sowerbyella rectangularis – type locality for species
- †Spathognathodus
  - †Spathognathodus inclinatus
- †Spencella
  - †Spencella acanthina
  - †Spencella montanensis
- †Sphaerina
  - †Sphaerina congregata
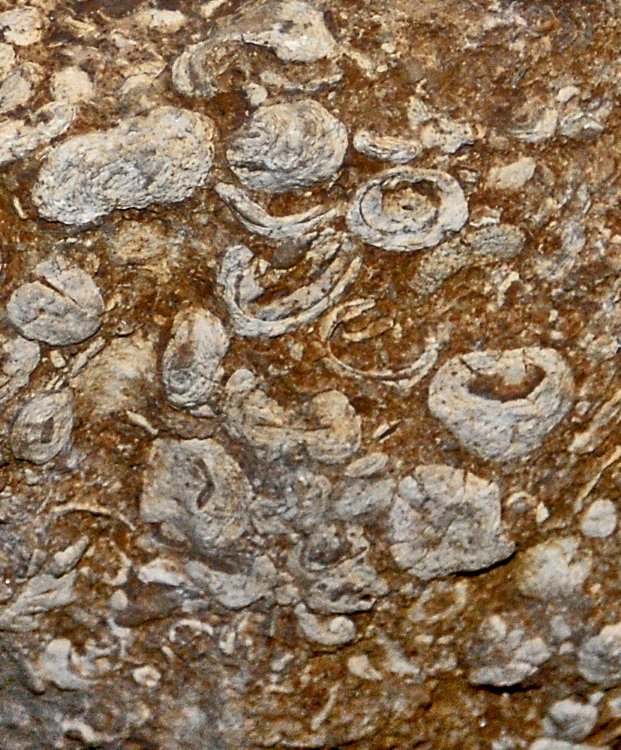
- Assemblage of fossils of the Ordovician-Triassic blue-green alga Sphaerocodium
  †Sphaerocodium
- †Sphaerodoma
- †Sphenosteges
  - †Sphenosteges hispidus – or unidentified related form
- †Spinatrypa
  - †Spinatrypa spinosa
  - †Spinatrypa trulla – or unidentified comparable form
- †Spinicharybdis
  - †Spinicharybdis boucoti – type locality for species
  - †Spinicharybdis krizi – type locality for species
- †Spinulrichospira – type locality for genus
  - †Spinulrichospira cheeneetnukensis – type locality for species
  - †Spinulrichospira churkini – type locality for species
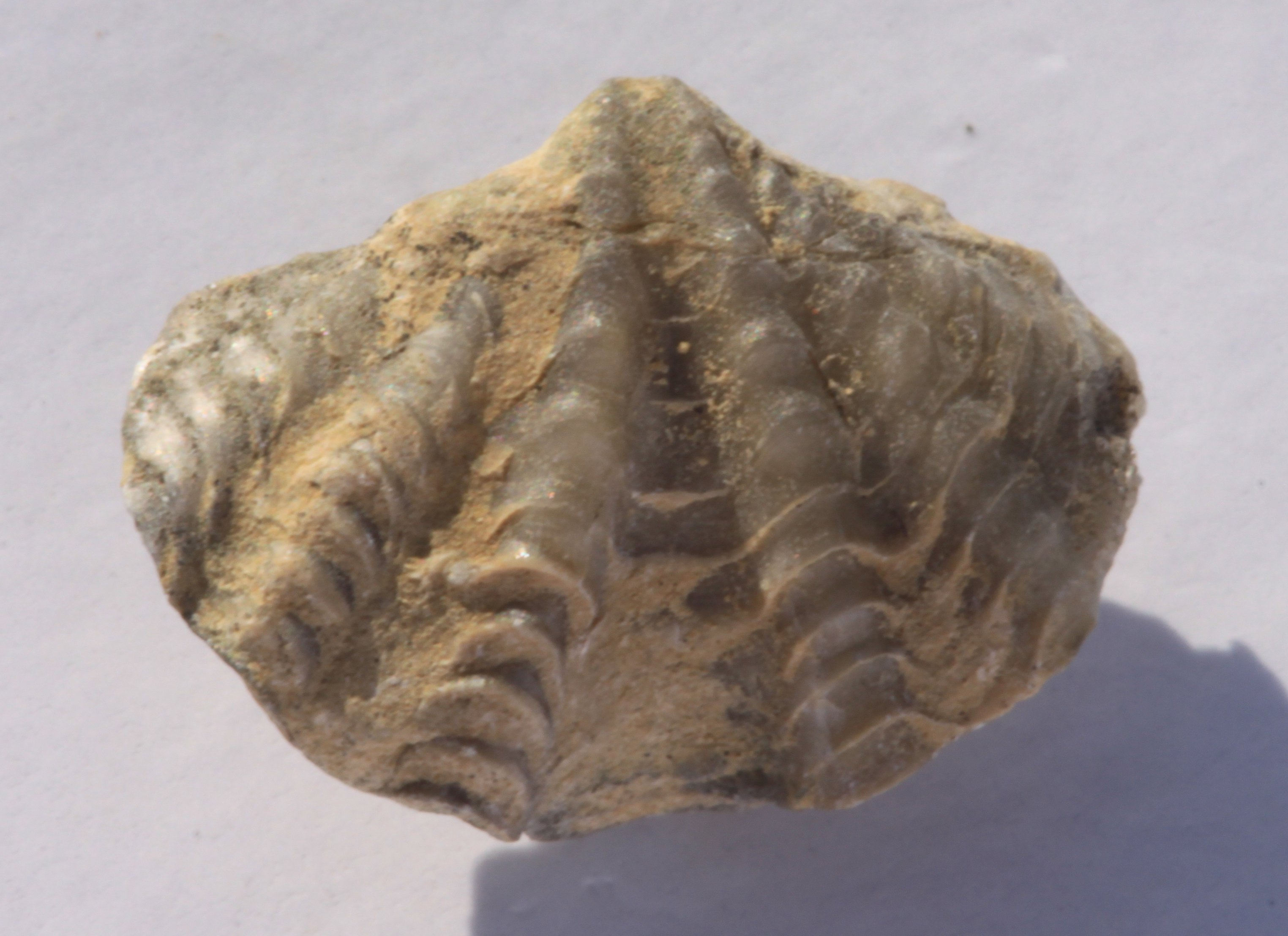
- Fossilized shell of the Late Ordovician-Late Triassic brachiopod Spirifer
  †Spirifer
  - †Spirifer allatus – or unidentified related form
  - †Spirifer anossofi
  - †Spirifer bifurcatus – or unidentified related form
  - †Spirifer bisulcatus – or unidentified related form
  - †Spirifer cheiropteryx – or unidentified comparable form
  - †Spirifer disjunctus
  - †Spirifer duplicicostatus
  - †Spirifer hians
  - †Spirifer incertus – or unidentified related form
  - †Spirifer indeferens
  - †Spirifer keokuk – or unidentified related form
  - †Spirifer missouriensis – or unidentified related form
  - †Spirifer mosquensis – or unidentified related form
  - †Spirifer pellensis – or unidentified related form
  - †Spirifer schellwieni – or unidentified related form
  - †Spirifer subcomprimatus
  - †Spirifer thetides – or unidentified comparable form
  - †Spirifer thetidis
- †Spiriferella
  - †Spiriferella arctica
  - †Spiriferella artica
  - †Spiriferella interplicata – or unidentified related form
  - †Spiriferella keilhavii
  - †Spiriferella pseudotibetana
- †Spiriferellina
  - †Spiriferellina cristata – or unidentified related form
- †Spiriferina
  - †Spiriferina holtzapfeli – or unidentified related form
  - †Spiriferina panderi – or unidentified related form
- †Spiriferinaella
  - †Spiriferinaella artiensis – or unidentified related form
  - †Spiriferinaella tastubensis – or unidentified related form
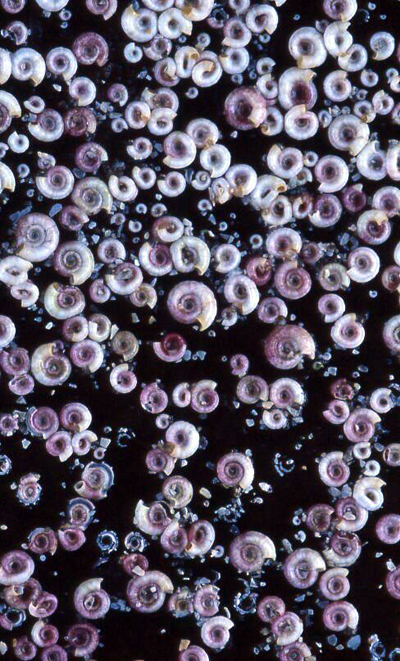
- Modern shells of the polychaete worm Spirorbis
  Spirorbis
- †Spongophyllum
- †Spyroceras
- †Squamularia
- †Stauria
- †Stegocoelia – tentative report
- †Stelliporella
- †Stenoloron
  - †Stenoloron swallovana – or unidentified related form
- †Stenopora
- †Stenorhynchia
- †Stenoscisma
  - †Stenoscisma bisinuata – or unidentified related form
  - †Stenoscisma crumena – or unidentified related form
  - †Stenoscisma margaritovi
  - †Stenoscisma mutabilis – or unidentified related form
  - †Stenoscisma purdoni – or unidentified related form
  - †Stenoscisma spitzbergiana
- †Stictopora
- †Stigmosphaerostylus
  - †Stigmosphaerostylus itsukaichiensis
- †Stipespongia – type locality for genus
  - †Stipespongia laminata – type locality for species
- †Straparollina
  - †Straparollina circe
  - †Straparollina eurydice – or unidentified comparable form
- †Straparollus
  - †Straparollus spergenensis – or unidentified related form
- †Streblopteria
  - †Streblopteria montpelierensis – or unidentified related form
- †Streblotrypa – tentative report
- †Streptacis
  - †Streptacis subgracilis – or unidentified related form
- †Streptorhynchus
  - †Streptorhynchus pelargonatum – or unidentified related form
  - †Streptorhynchus pelargonatus – or unidentified related form
- †Streptotrochus
  - †Streptotrochus amicus – or unidentified comparable form
- †Striatifera
  - †Striatifera ischmensis – or unidentified related form
- †Striatopora
- †Striatostyliolina
- †Stringocephalus
  - †Stringocephalus burtini
- †Stringophyllum
- †Strobeus
- †Stromatopora
- †Strophalosia – tentative report
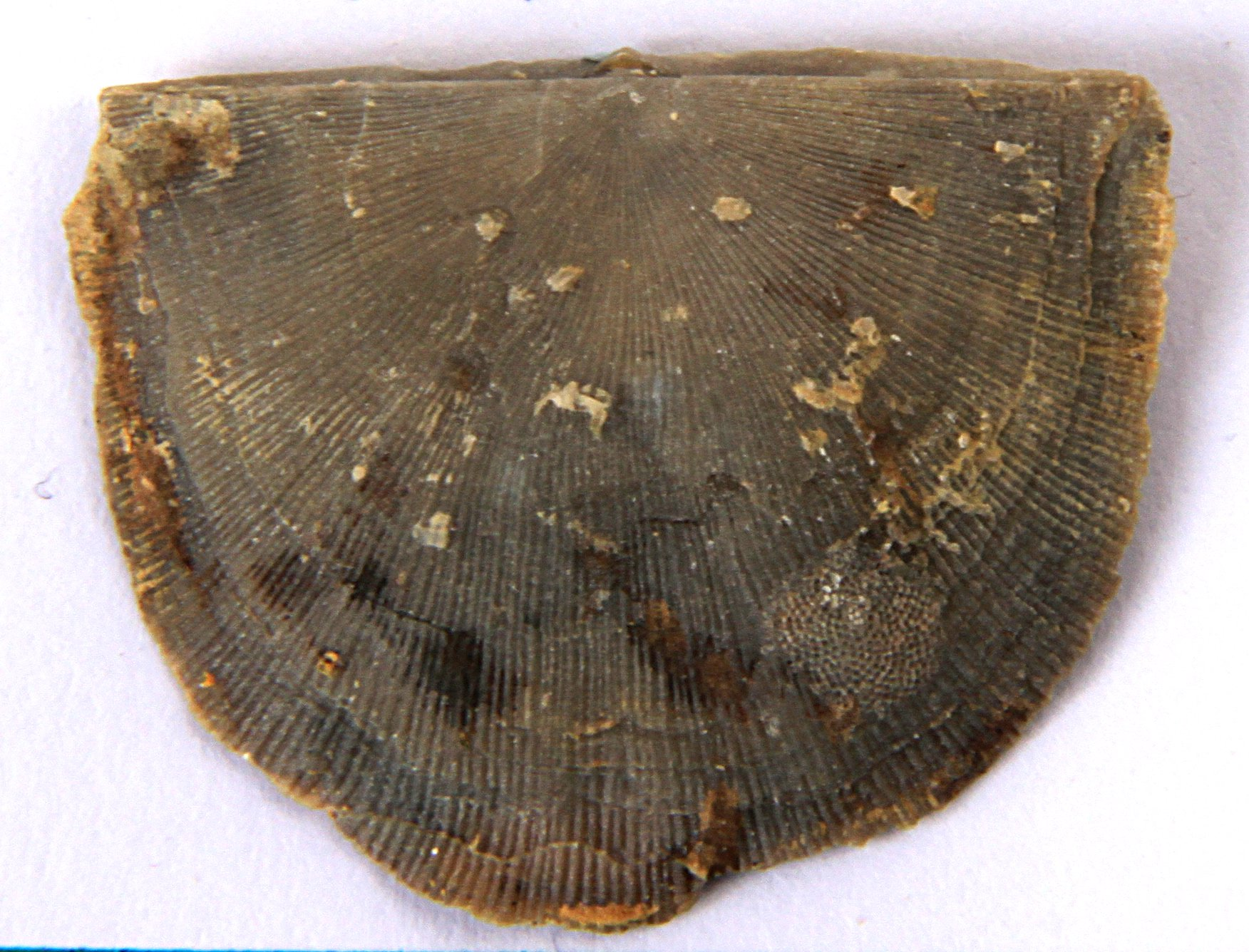
- Fossilized shell of the Ordovician-Silurian brachiopod Strophomena
  †Strophomena
  - †Strophomena comitans
  - †Strophomena fugax – or unidentified comparable form
  - †Strophomena planobesa
  - †Strophomena stephani
- †Strophonella
- †Strophostylus
- †Styliolina
  - †Styliolina fissurella
- †Subanarcestes – tentative report
- †Sumatrina – tentative report
- †Svalbardia
  - †Svalbardia toulai
- †Sycidium
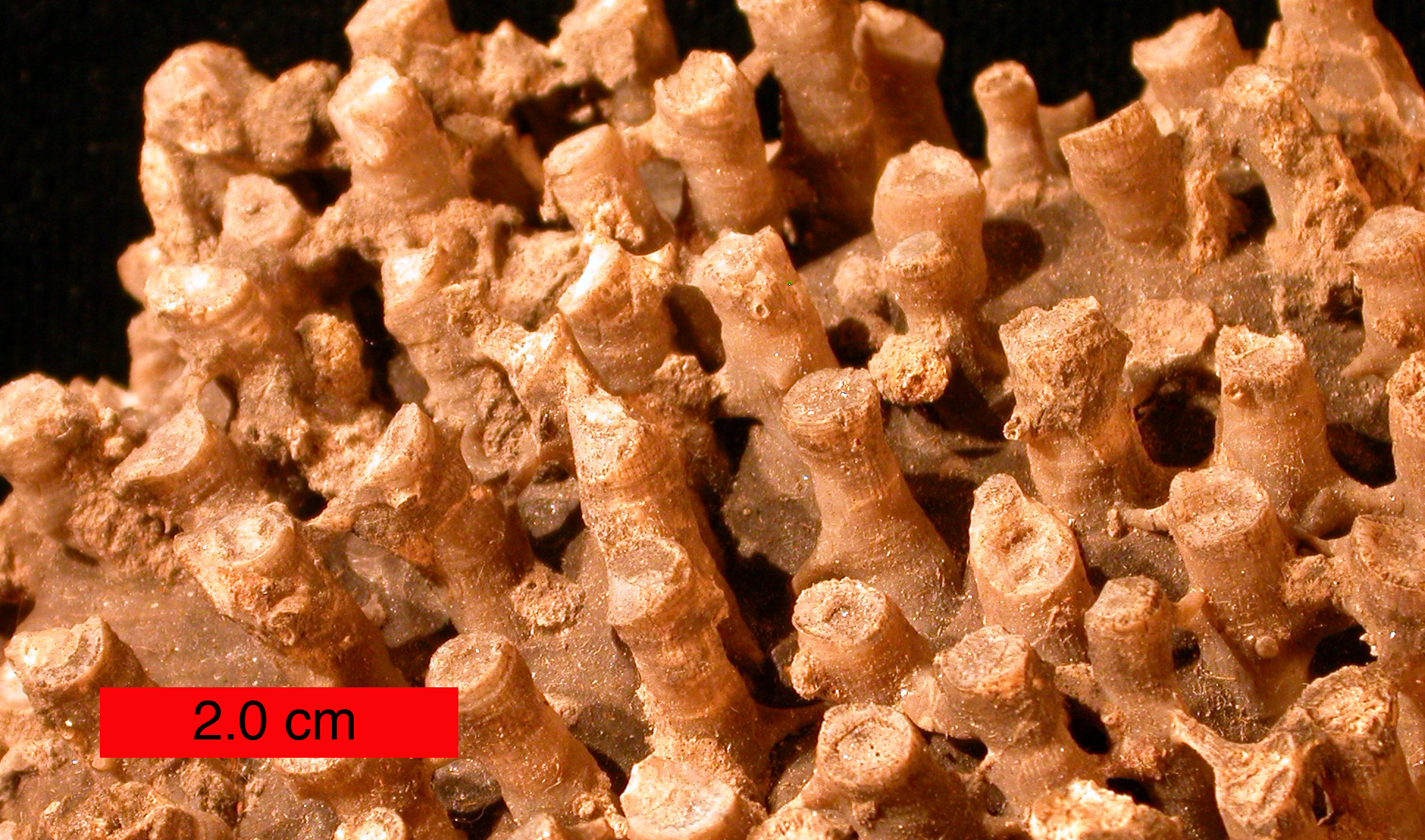
- Fossil of the Devonian tabulate coral Syringopora
  †Syringopora
  - †Syringopora formosa – type locality for species
  - †Syringopora obesa
  - †Syringopora rockfordensis
  - †Syringopora schulzei
- †Syringoporella
  - †Syringoporella rara – type locality for species
- †Syringoporinus
- †Syringothyris

== T ==
- †Tabularia
- †Tabulophyllum
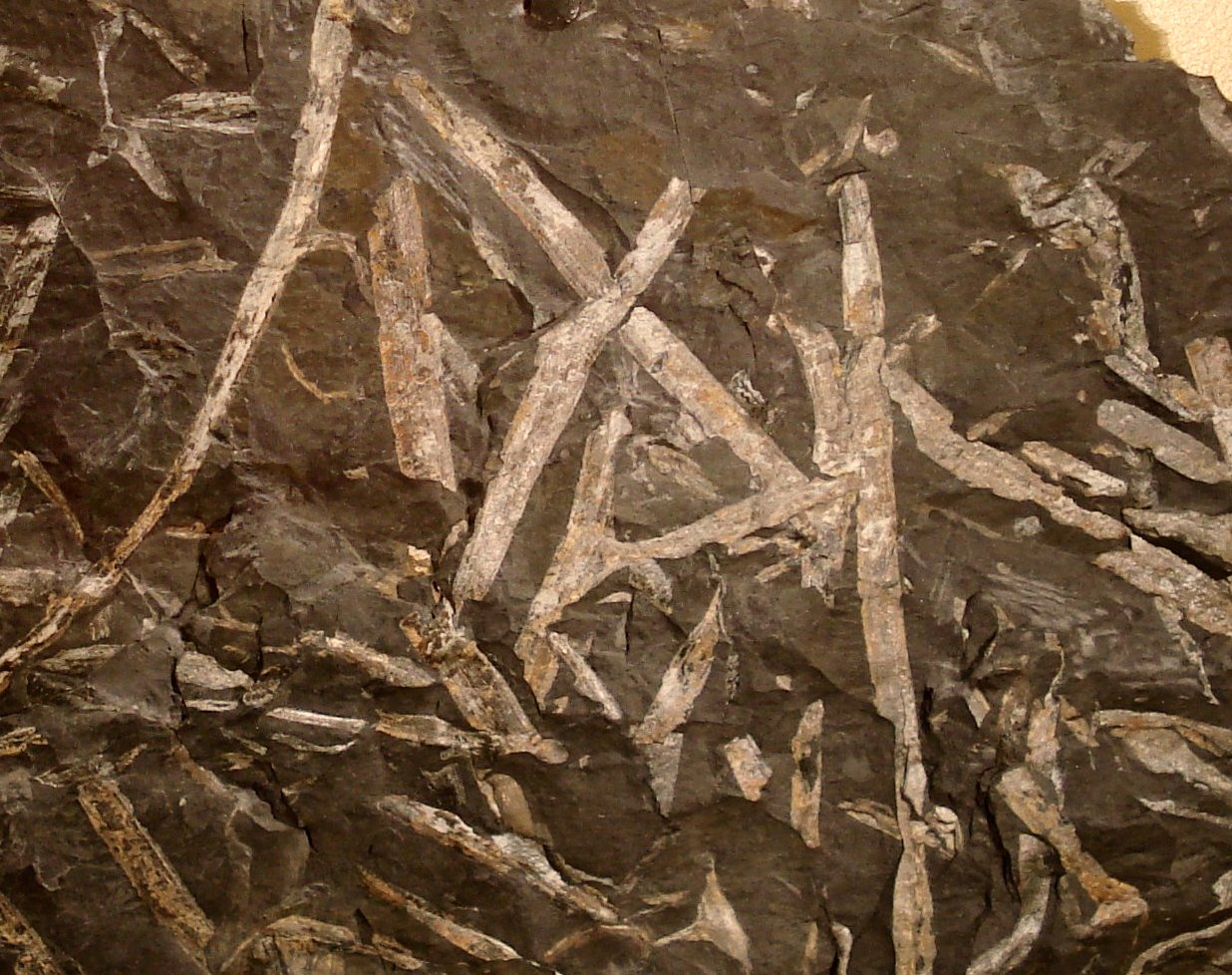
- Fossils of the Devonian plant stem morphogenus Taeniocrada
  †Taeniocrada
- †Taimyrophyllum
- †Taimyrrhynx
  - †Taimyrrhynx taimyrico
- †Taphrorthis
  - †Taphrorthis immatura
- †Tchaiaspis
- †Tcherskidium
  - †Tcherskidium unicum
- †Teganium
- †Teguliferina – tentative report
- †Teichertina
- †Telinopsis
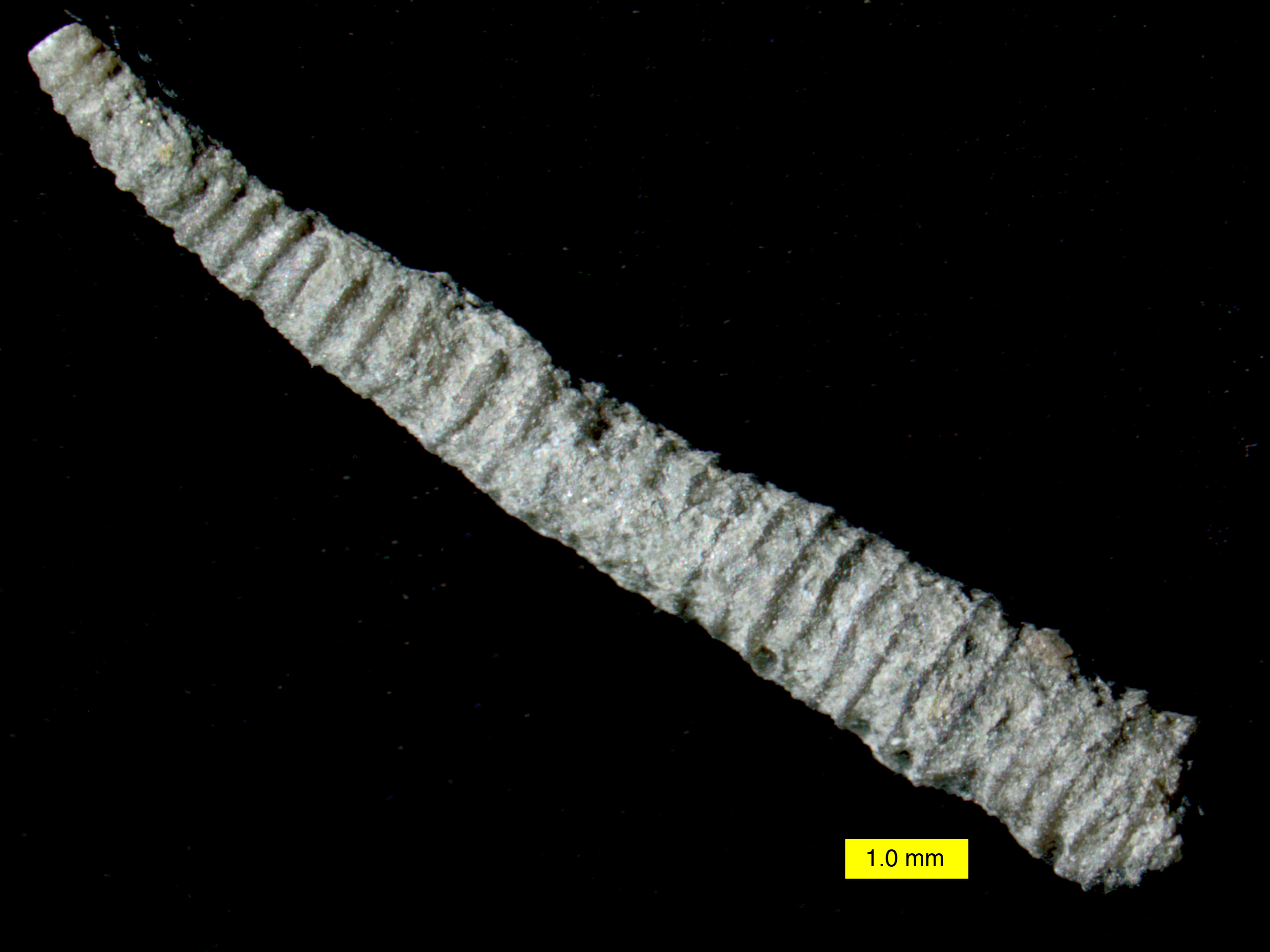
- Fossilized shell of the Early Ordovician-Late Devonian probable mollusc Tentaculites
  †Tentaculites
- †Tenticospirifer
  - †Tenticospirifer wadleighensis
- †Terrakea – tentative report
- †Tersella
  - †Tersella sainsburyi – type locality for species
- †Tetradium
- †Tetragraptus
  - †Tetragraptus quadribrachiatus – or unidentified comparable form
- †Tetraprioniodus – tentative report
- †Thamniscus – tentative report
- †Thamnophyllum
- †Thamnopora
- †Thamnosia
  - †Thamnosia arctica
- †Thecostegites
- †Theodossia
  - †Theodossia albertoensis
- †Tholifrons – type locality for genus
  - †Tholifrons adevna – type locality for species
  - †Tholifrons minutus – type locality for species
- †Thysanophyllum
  - †Thysanophyllum astraeiforme
  - †Thysanophyllum orientale
- †Tiramnia
  - †Tiramnia greenlandica
- †Tityrophora – tentative report
- †Tollina
- †Tortodus
  - †Tortodus kockelianus
  - †Tortodus kockeliensis
- †Torynifer
  - †Torynifer pseudolineatus – or unidentified related form
- †Tostonia
- †Trabeculites
- †Transridgeia – type locality for genus
  - †Transridgeia costata – type locality for species
- †Trapezophyllum
- †Tremanotus
- †Trepospira – tentative report
- †Triaenosphaera
  - †Triaenosphaera hebes
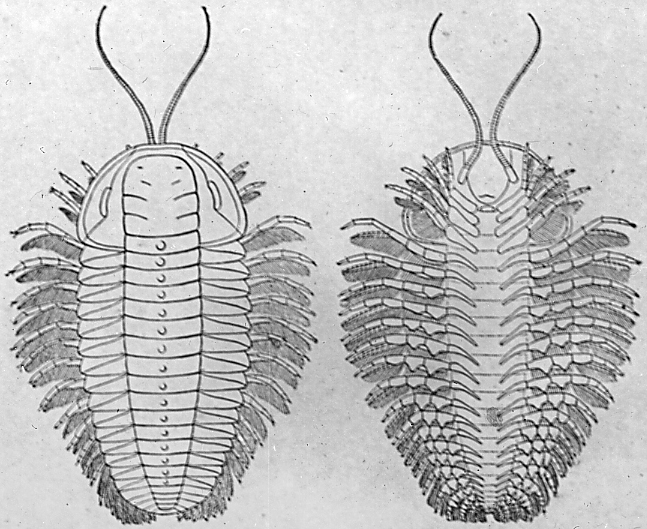
- Restoration showing the top (left) and underside of the Late Ordovician trilobite Triarthrus
  †Triarthrus
- †Trigonirhynchia
  - †Trigonirhynchia ventricosa – or unidentified related form
- †Triplophyllum
- †Triticites
- †Trochomphalus
  - †Trochomphalus dimidiatus
- †Trochonema
  - †Trochonema retrorsum – or unidentified related form
  - †Trochonema wartheni
- †Trochonemella
  - †Trochonemella churkini – type locality for species
  - †Trochonemella reusingi – type locality for species
- †Tropidodiscus
- †Tryplasma
- †Tscherkidium
- †Tuberculatella
  - †Tuberculatella tuberculata – or unidentified related form
- †Tubina
- †Turbonellina
  - †Turbonellina chatzepovkensis – or unidentified related form
- †Turbospongia – type locality for genus
  - †Turbospongia biperforata – type locality for species
- †Turrilepas
  - †Turrilepas type locality for species A – informal
- †Tuxekanella
  - †Tuxekanella simplex

== U ==
- †Ulungaratoconcha – type locality for genus
  - †Ulungaratoconcha heidelbergeri – type locality for species
- †Uncinulus – report made of unidentified related form or using admittedly obsolete nomenclature
  - †Uncinulus polaris
- †Undatrypa
- †Uniconus
  - †Uniconus livnensis
  - †Uniconus orbiculus
- †Uraloceras
  - †Uraloceras burtiense
  - †Uraloceras fedorowi
  - †Uraloceras involutum
  - †Uraloceras nevadense

== V ==
- †Verbeekina
- †Verneuilia
  - †Verneuilia langenstrasseni – type locality for species
- †Virgulaspongia – type locality for genus
  - †Virgulaspongia uniforma – type locality for species
- †Viriatellina – or unidentified comparable form
  - †Viriatellina gemuendina

== W ==
- †Waagenites
  - †Waagenites trapezoidalis – or unidentified related form
- †Waagenoconcha
  - †Waagenoconcha humboldti
  - †Waagenoconcha irginae – or unidentified comparable form
  - †Waagenoconcha irginaeformis – or unidentified comparable form
  - †Waagenoconcha payeri
  - †Waagenoconcha tastubensis
- †Warrenella
- †Wedekindellina
  - †Wedekindellina uralica
- †Westbroekina
  - †Westbroekina chacoensis
- †Westergaardodina
- †Whidbornella
  - †Whidbornella lachrymosa – or unidentified comparable form
- †Whitfieldella
- †Wilberrya
- †Winterbergiella
  - †Winterbergiella binodosa – or unidentified related form
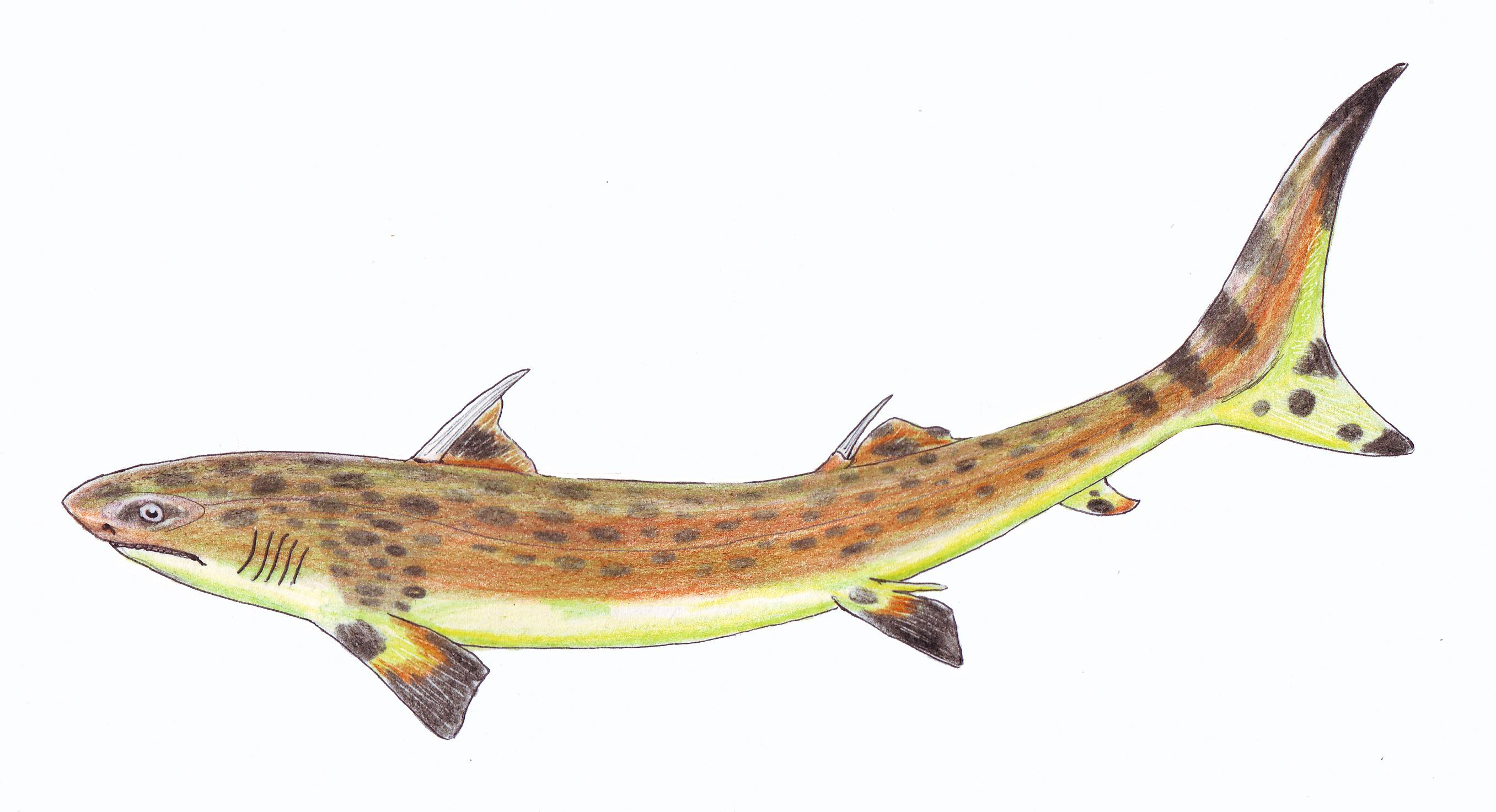
- Restoration of the Permian shark Wodnika
  †Wodnika
  - †Wodnika borealis

== X ==
- †Xenambonites
  - †Xenambonites revelatus
- †Xystriphyllum
  - †Xystriphyllum devonicum
  - †Xystriphyllum gorskii
  - †Xystriphyllum schluteri

== Y ==
- †Yabeina
- †Yacutipora
- †Yakovlevia
  - †Yakovlevia greenlandica – or unidentified comparable form
  - †Yakovlevia mammata
  - †Yakovlevia multistriata – or unidentified related form

== Z ==
- †Zacanthoides
- †Zamiopteris
- †Zaphrenthis
  - †Zaphrenthis gigantea
- †Zelophyllum
- †Zonophyllum
- †Zygopleura
