= List of the Paleozoic life of Missouri =

This list of the Paleozoic life of Missouri contains the various prehistoric life-forms whose fossilized remains have been reported from within the US state of Missouri and are between 538.8 and 252.17 million years of age.

There is no Permian age rocks on the surface in Missouri, so beware of any fossils identified as such in the state.

== A ==
- †Abludoglyptocrinus
- †Acambona
  - †Acambona prima
- †Acanthocrania
  - †Acanthocrania spiculata
- †Acanthoparypha
  - †Acanthoparypha subcircularis
- †Acanthospirina
  - †Acanthospirina aciculifera
- †Achatella
  - †Achatella katharina
- †Achistrum
  - †Achistrum coloculum
  - †Achistrum gamma
  - †Achistrum monochordata
- †Acidiphorus – tentative report
- †Acolocrinus
- †Acutimitoceras – tentative report
- †Aganides
  - †Aganides compressus
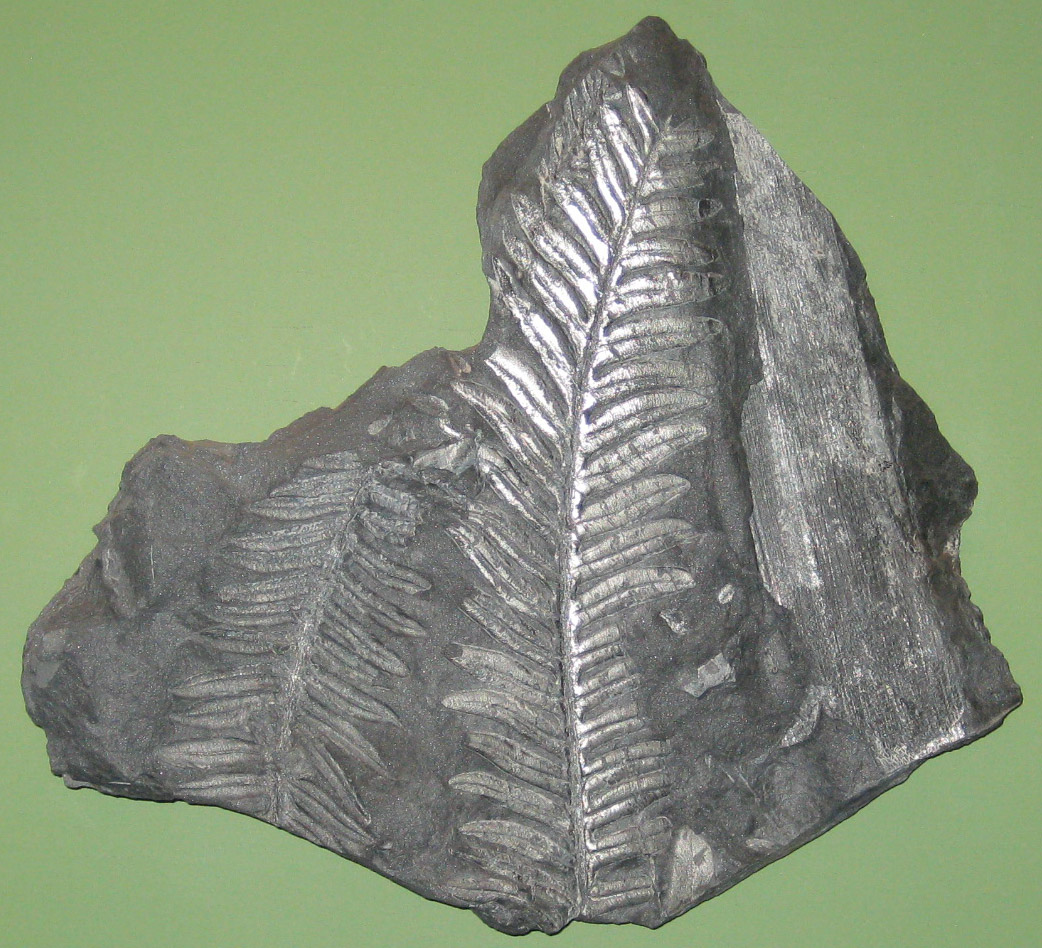
- Fossilized fronds of the Carboniferous-Early Cretaceous seed fern Alethopteris
  †Alethopteris
  - †Alethopteris davreuxi
  - †Alethopteris decurrens
  - †Alethopteris grandini
  - †Alethopteris serli
  - †Alethopteris serlii
  - †Alethopteris valida
- †Allagecrinus
  - †Allagecrinus americanus
  - †Allagecrinus rowleyi – type locality for species
- †Allanella
  - †Allanella annae
- †Allorhynchus – tentative report
  - †Allorhynchus curriei
  - †Allorhynchus currieri
  - †Allorhynchus louisianensis
- †Amaurotoma
  - †Amaurotoma subsinuata
- †Amblymylacris
  - †Amblymylacris clintoniana – type locality for species
  - †Amblymylacris harei – type locality for species
- †Ambocoelia
  - †Ambocoelia louisianensis – type locality for species
  - †Ambocoelia minuta
- †Ameropiltonia – type locality for genus
  - †Ameropiltonia lauradanae – type locality for species
- †Amphilichas
  - †Amphilichas antiquarius
  - †Amphilichas aspratilis
  - †Amphilichas cucullus
  - †Amphilichas subdisjunctus
- †Amphipsalidocrinus
- †Amphiscapha
  - †Amphiscapha catilloides
  - †Amphiscapha reedsi – type locality for species
  - †Amphiscapha subrugosa
- †Ananias
  - †Ananias nodocostatus – type locality for species
  - †Ananias welleri – tentative report
- †Anapiculatisporites
  - †Anapiculatisporites grundensis
- †Anarkemina
  - †Anarkemina winsdoriensis – type locality for species
- †Anazyga
  - †Anazyga recurvirostra
- †Anchicrinus
- †Anematina
  - †Anematina minutissimus – type locality for species
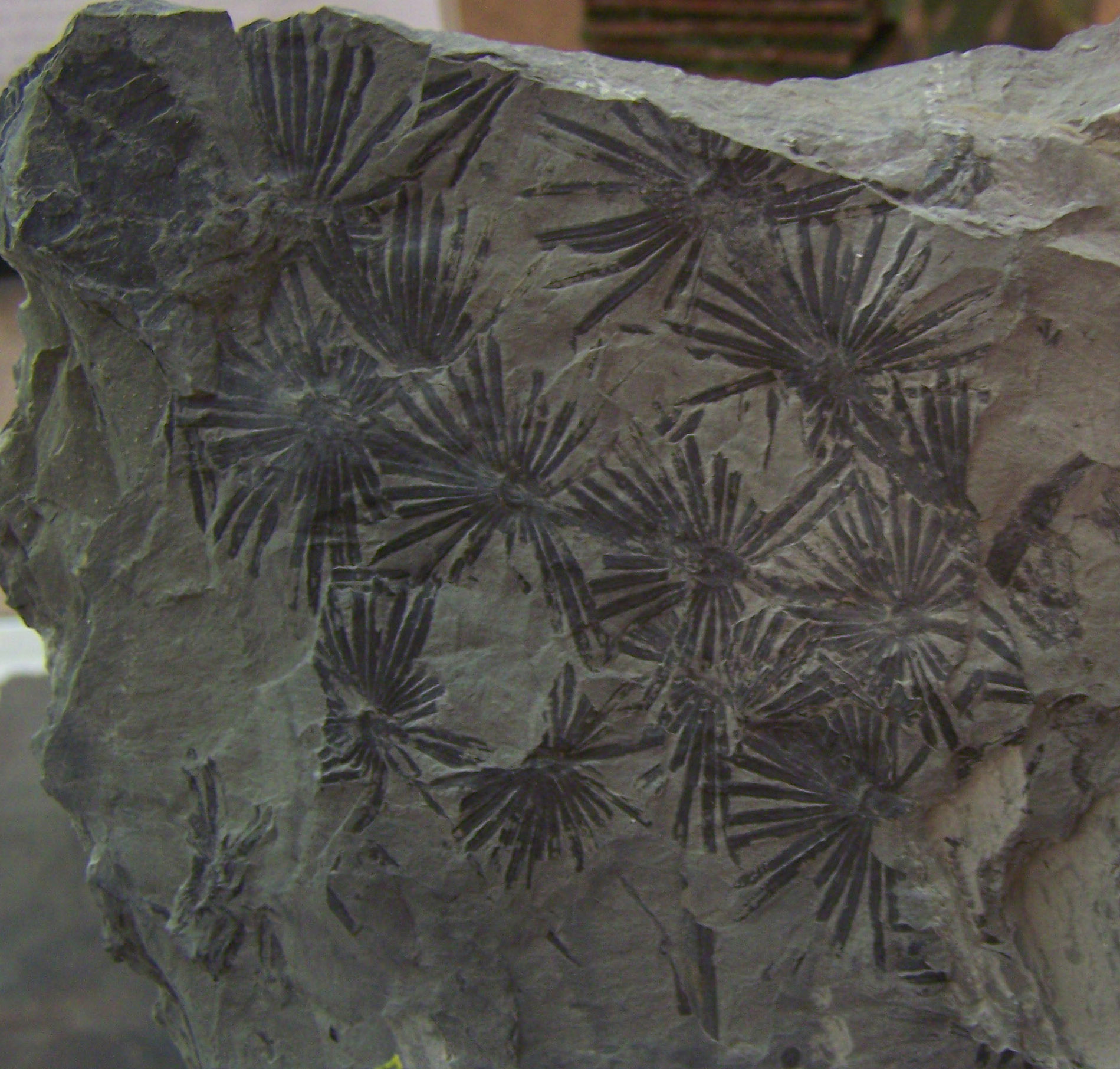
- Fossil of the Carboniferous horsetail relative Annularia
  †Annularia
  - †Annularia acicularis
  - †Annularia galioides
  - †Annularia sphenophylloides
  - †Annularia stellata
- †Annuliconcha
  - †Annuliconcha interlineata
- †Anomphalus
  - †Anomphalus umbilicatus – type locality for species
- †Anthracoceras
  - †Anthracoceras missouriense – type locality for species
- †Anthraconeilo – tentative report
  - †Anthraconeilo taffiana
- †Anthracospirifer
  - †Anthracospirifer occiduus
- †Antiquatonia
  - †Antiquatonia coloradoensis
  - †Antiquatonia portlockianus
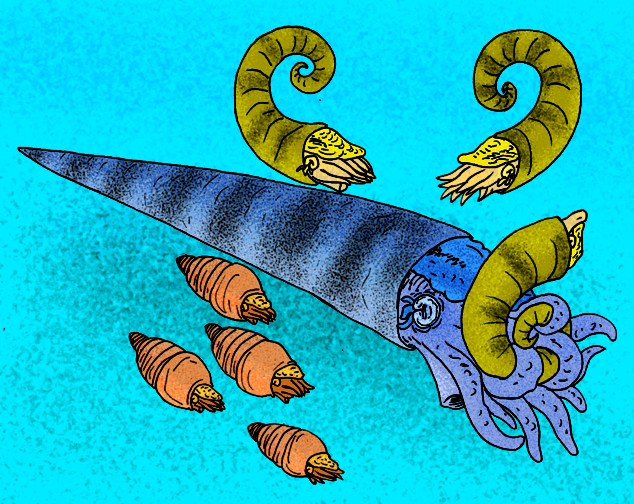
- Restoration of the Late Ordovician nautiloid cephalopod Aphetoceras being preyed upon by a Cameroceras
  †Aphetoceras
  - †Aphetoceras subcostulatum
- †Aphlebia
- †Apiculatasporites
  - †Apiculatasporites latigranifer
  - †Apiculatasporites setulosus
  - †Apiculatasporites variusetosus
- †Araeonema – type locality for genus
  - †Araeonema virgatum – type locality for species
- †Archaeocrinus
- †Archeoconus – type locality for genus
  - †Archeoconus missourensis – type locality for species
- †Archeognathus – type locality for genus
  - †Archeognathus carinatus – type locality for species
  - †Archeognathus primus – type locality for species
- †Archinacella
  - †Archinacella patelliformis
- †Artisia
  - †Artisia transversa
- †Asolanus
  - †Asolanus camptotaenia
- †Aspidiaria
- †Astartella
  - †Astartella compacta
  - †Astartella concentrica
- †Asterophyllites
  - †Asterophyllites equisetiformis
- †Asterotheca
- †Astraeospongium
- †Astrocystites
- †Athyris
  - †Athyris bradyensis – or unidentified comparable form
  - †Athyris cora
  - †Athyris fultonensis
  - †Athyris hannibalensis
  - †Athyris lamellosa
  - †Athyris vittata
- †Atribonium
  - †Atribonium gregari
  - †Atribonium swallovi
- †Atrypina
  - †Atrypina saffordi – or unidentified comparable form
- †Aulochiton – type locality for genus
  - †Aulochiton sannerae – type locality for species
- †Avaoceras
  - †Avaoceras elongatum
  - †Avaoceras longidomum
  - †Avaoceras magnisiphonatum
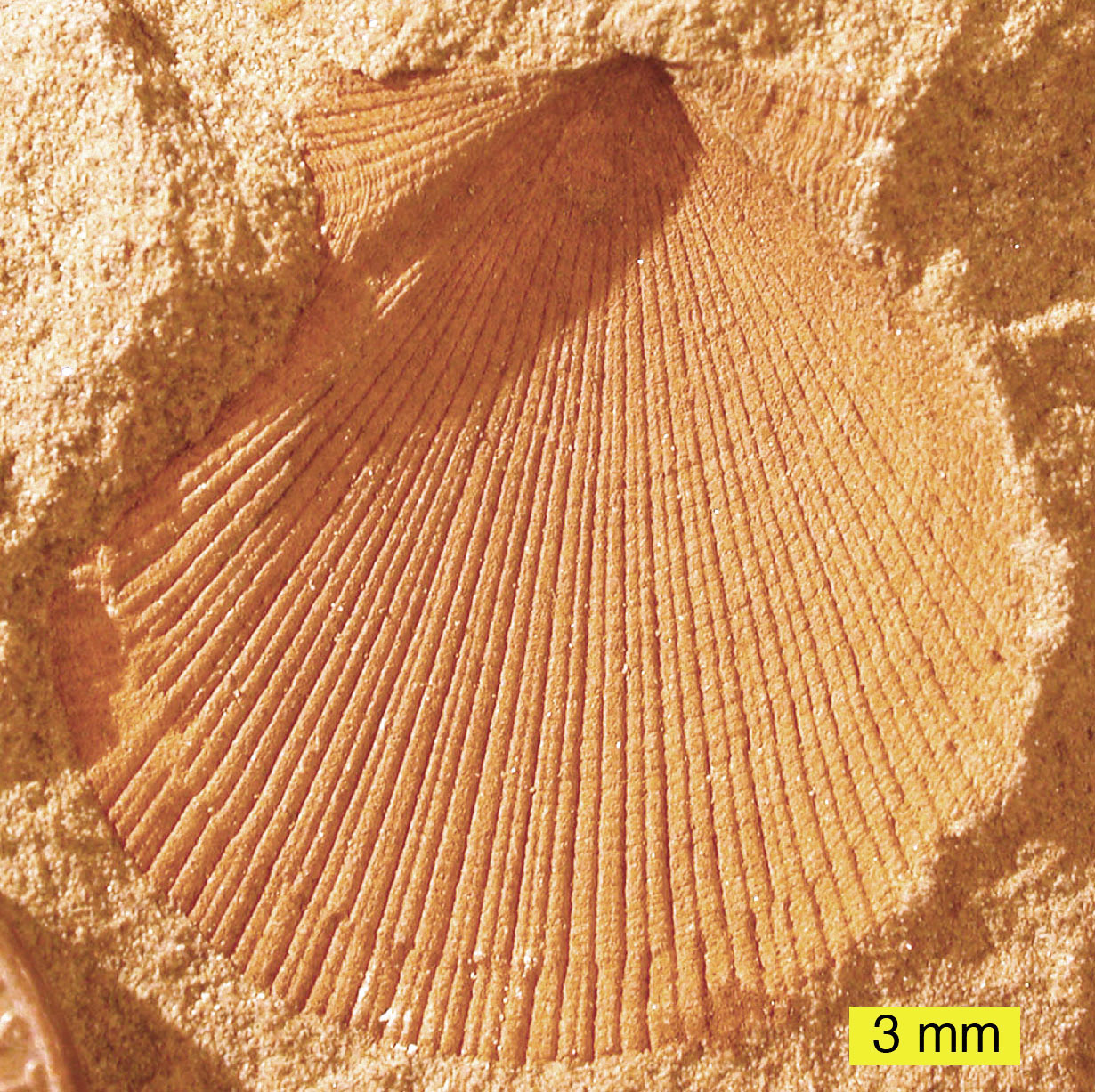
- Mold fossil of a shell of the Early Devonian-Late Triassic bivalve Aviculopecten
  †Aviculopecten
  - †Aviculopecten gradicosta
  - †Aviculopecten marbuti
- †Avonia
  - †Avonia linospinosa
- †Axiodeaneia
  - †Axiodeaneia glenparkensis

== B ==
- †Bactrites
- †Bathyurus
  - †Bathyurus missouriensis – type locality for species
  - †Bathyurus spiniger
- †Beecheria
  - †Beecheria burlingtonensis
  - †Beecheria paraplicata
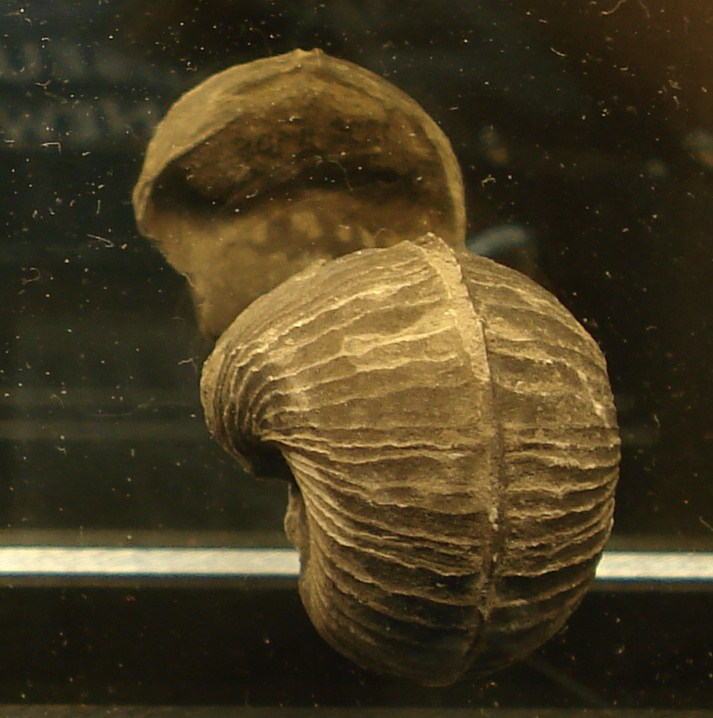
- Fossilized shell of the Silurian-Early Triassic mollusc Bellerophon
  †Bellerophon
  - †Bellerophon blairi – type locality for species
  - †Bellerophon graphicus
  - †Bellerophon jeffersonensis – type locality for species
  - †Bellerophon planodorsatum – type locality for species
  - †Bellerophon sedaliensis – type locality for species
  - †Bellerophon ulrichi – type locality for species
- †Belodina
  - †Belodina compressa
- †Bembexia
  - †Bembexia minima
- †Besselodus
  - †Besselodus variabilis
- †Beyrichoceras
  - †Beyrichoceras hornerae – type locality for species
- †Biloboconus – type locality for genus
  - †Biloboconus frizzelli – type locality for species
- †Biparetis – type locality for genus
  - †Biparetis paucirugosus – type locality for species
- †Bipulvina – type locality for genus
  - †Bipulvina croftsae – type locality for species
- †Bisatoceras
  - †Bisatoceras greenei – type locality for species
- †Blattinopsis – type locality for genus
  - †Blattinopsis laqueata – type locality for species
- †Blountia
- †Bolbocephalus
  - †Bolbocephalus sainteclairi – or unidentified related form
  - †Bolbocephalus stclairi – or unidentified related form
- †Botryocrinus
- †Bouskacrinus
  - †Bouskacrinus laudoni
- †Brachymetopus
  - †Brachymetopus spinosiformis – type locality for species
- †Brachythyris
  - †Brachythyris chouteauensis
- †Brevilamnulella
  - †Brevilamnulella thebesensis
- †Breviphillipsia
  - †Breviphillipsia sampsoni
  - †Breviphillipsia semiteretis
  - †Breviphillipsia swallowi
- †Bridgeites
  - †Bridgeites planidorsalis – type locality for species
  - †Bridgeites supraconvexa – type locality for species
- †Brittsia
  - †Brittsia problematica
- †Bryantodus
  - †Bryantodus cameratus – type locality for species
  - †Bryantodus delicatus – type locality for species
  - †Bryantodus rugosus – type locality for species
  - †Bryantodus strigatus – type locality for species
  - †Bryantodus strigillatus – type locality for species
- †Bucania
  - †Bucania batchtownensis
  - †Bucania halli
- †Bumastoides
  - †Bumastoides billingsi
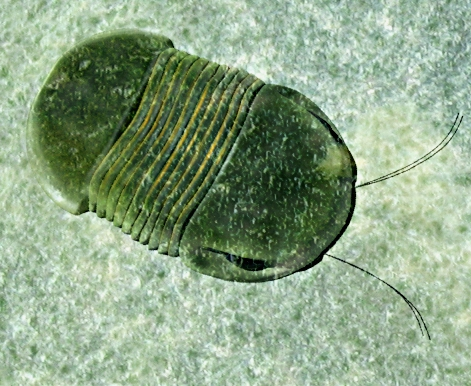
- Life restoration of the Early Ordovician-Silurian trilobite Bumastus
  †Bumastus
  - †Bumastus rowleyi
  - †Bumastus trentonensis
- †Burnetiella
  - †Burnetiella alta
  - †Burnetiella exilis
- †Buttsia
  - †Buttsia drabensis
- †Bynumina
  - †Bynumina caelata
  - †Bynumina lirae – type locality for species

== C ==
- †Cadiospora
  - †Cadiospora magna
- †Caenanoplia
  - †Caenanoplia burlingtonensis
  - †Caenanoplia logani – or unidentified related form
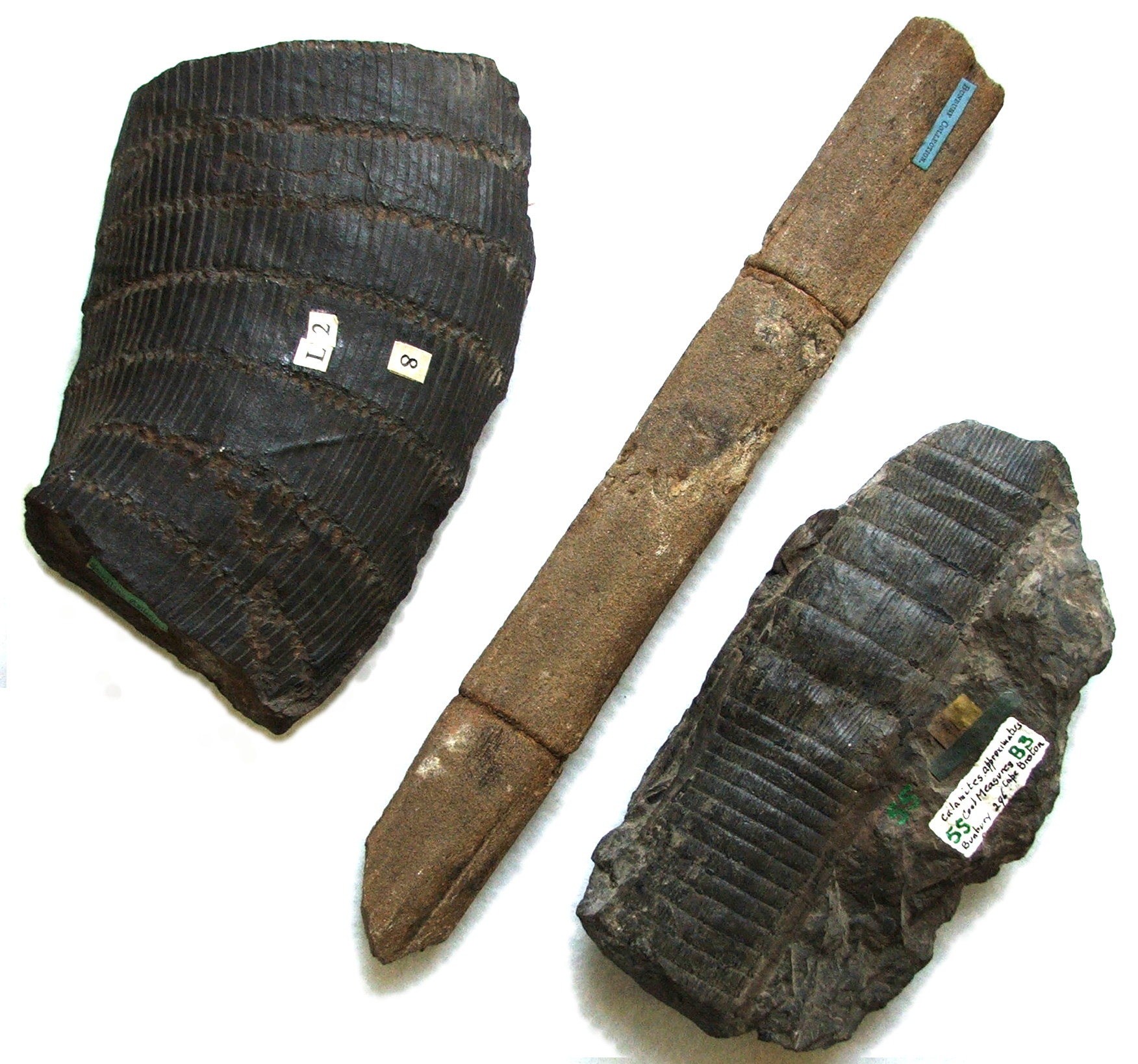
- Fossilized stems from the Carboniferous-Permian horsetail relative Calamites
  †Calamites
  - †Calamites carinatus
  - †Calamites cistii
  - †Calamites cruciatus
  - †Calamites ramosus artis
  - †Calamites suckowii
- †Calamospora
  - †Calamospora breviradiata
  - †Calamospora hartungiana
  - †Calamospora straminea
- †Calamostachys
  - †Calamostachys paniculata
  - †Calamostachys tuberculata
- †Callispira
  - †Callispira quinquecostata – or unidentified comparable form
- †Calocephalites
  - †Calocephalites minimus – type locality for species
  - †Calocephalites vularis – type locality for species
  - †Calocephalites vulgaris – type locality for species
- †Calvinella
  - †Calvinella ozarkensis
  - †Calvinella type locality for species – informal
- †Calyptaulax
  - †Calyptaulax callicephala
- †Camaraspis
  - †Camaraspis convexa
- †Camarophorella
  - †Camarophorella buckleyi
- †Camarotoechia
  - †Camarotoechia depressa
  - †Camarotoechia dotis
  - †Camarotoechia elegantula
  - †Camarotoechia gregeri
  - †Camarotoechia horsfordi
  - †Camarotoechia tuta
- †Cambrioconus – type locality for genus
  - †Cambrioconus expansus – type locality for species
- †Campbelloceras
  - †Campbelloceras overmani – type locality for species
- †Carabocrinus
- †Cardiocarpus
  - †Cardiocarpus crassus
  - †Cardiocarpus latealatum
  - †Cardiocarpus ovalis
- †Cardiomorpha
  - †Cardiomorpha missouriensis
- †Cardiothyris
  - †Cardiothyris pristina
- †Carinaropsis
  - †Carinaropsis cymbula
  - †Carinaropsis minima
- †Caryocrinites
- †Cataschisma – type locality for genus
  - †Cataschisma latiangularis – type locality for species
  - †Cataschisma typa – type locality for species
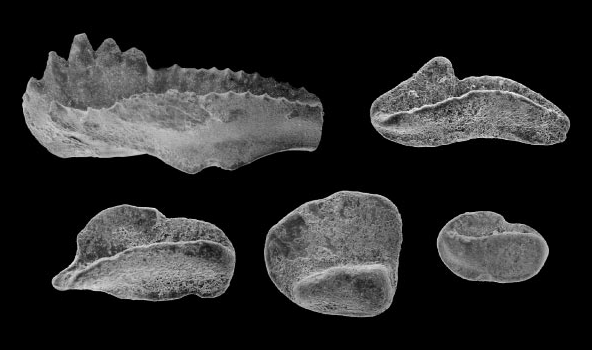
- Fossilized elements of the Carboniferous conodont Cavusgnathus
  †Cavusgnathus
  - †Cavusgnathus gigantus – type locality for species
  - †Cavusgnathus lautus – type locality for species
  - †Cavusgnathus missouriensis – type locality for species
- †Centronelloidea
  - †Centronelloidea rowleyi
- †Ceratoleperditia
  - †Ceratoleperditia type locality for species – informal
- †Ceratopea
  - †Ceratopea buttsi
  - †Ceratopea depressa
  - †Ceratopea grandis
  - †Ceratopea hami
  - †Ceratopea inflata – type locality for species
  - †Ceratopea sculpta – type locality for species
  - †Ceratopea unguis
  - †Ceratopea wisei – type locality for species
- †Ceraunocochlis – type locality for genus
  - †Ceraunocochlis blatta – type locality for species
  - †Ceraunocochlis fulminula – type locality for species
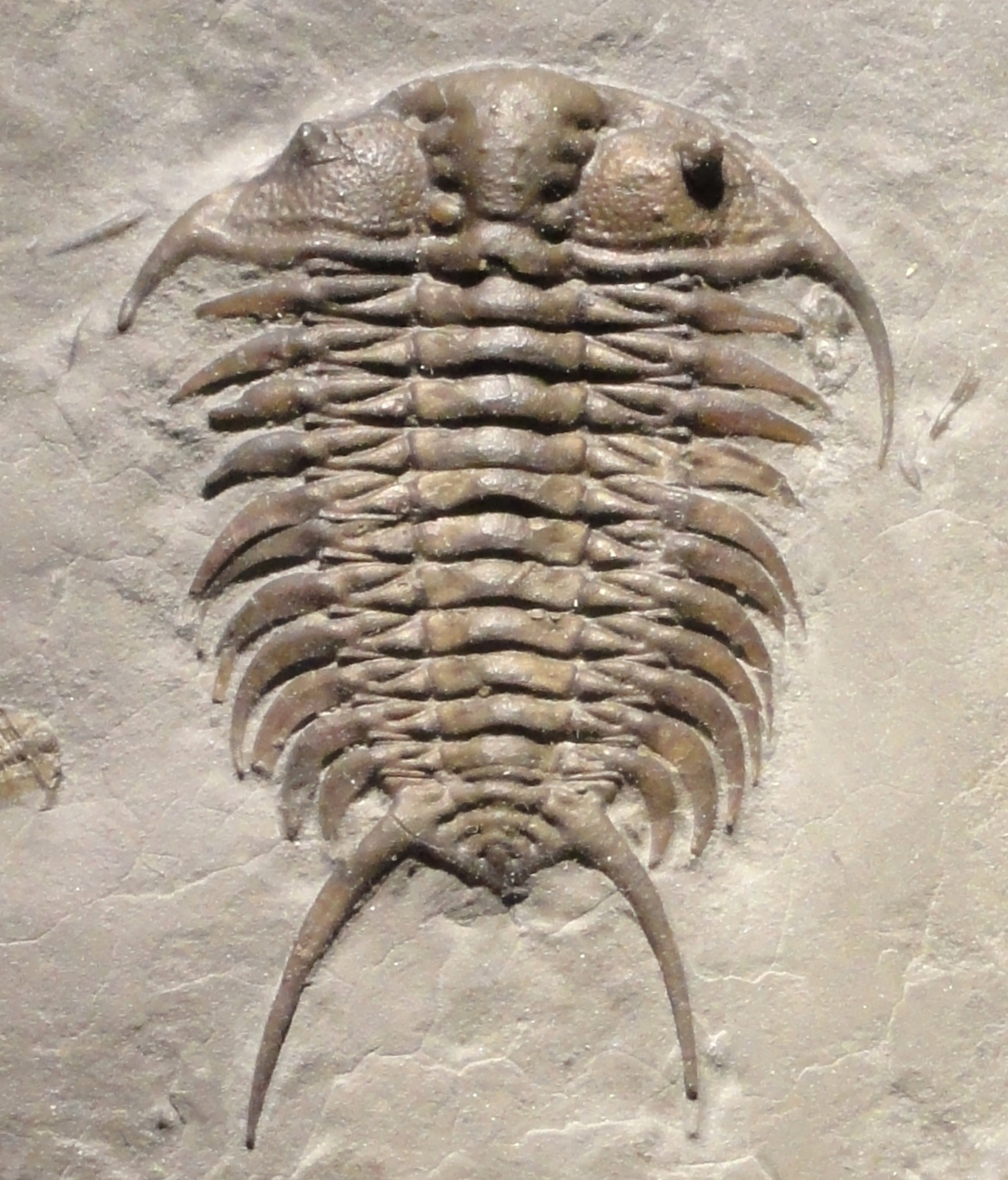
- Fossil of the Middle-Late Ordovician trilobite Ceraurus
  †Ceraurus
  - †Ceraurus globulobatus
  - †Ceraurus pleurexanthemus
- †Chaenomya – tentative report
  - †Chaenomya leavenworthensis
- †Cheilocephalus
- †Chelodes
  - †Chelodes cooperi
  - †Chelodes depressus
- †Chonetella
  - †Chonetella flemingi
- †Chonetes
  - †Chonetes decipiens
  - †Chonetes euampygus
  - †Chonetes geniculatus
  - †Chonetes lioderma
  - †Chonetes mesoloba
  - †Chonetes ornatus
- †Chonetinella
  - †Chonetinella flemingi
- †Cirratriradites
  - †Cirratriradites annuliformis
- †Clarkoceras
- †Clathrospira
  - †Clathrospira subconica
  - †Clathrospira virguncula – type locality for species
- †Clavallus
  - †Clavallus spicaudina
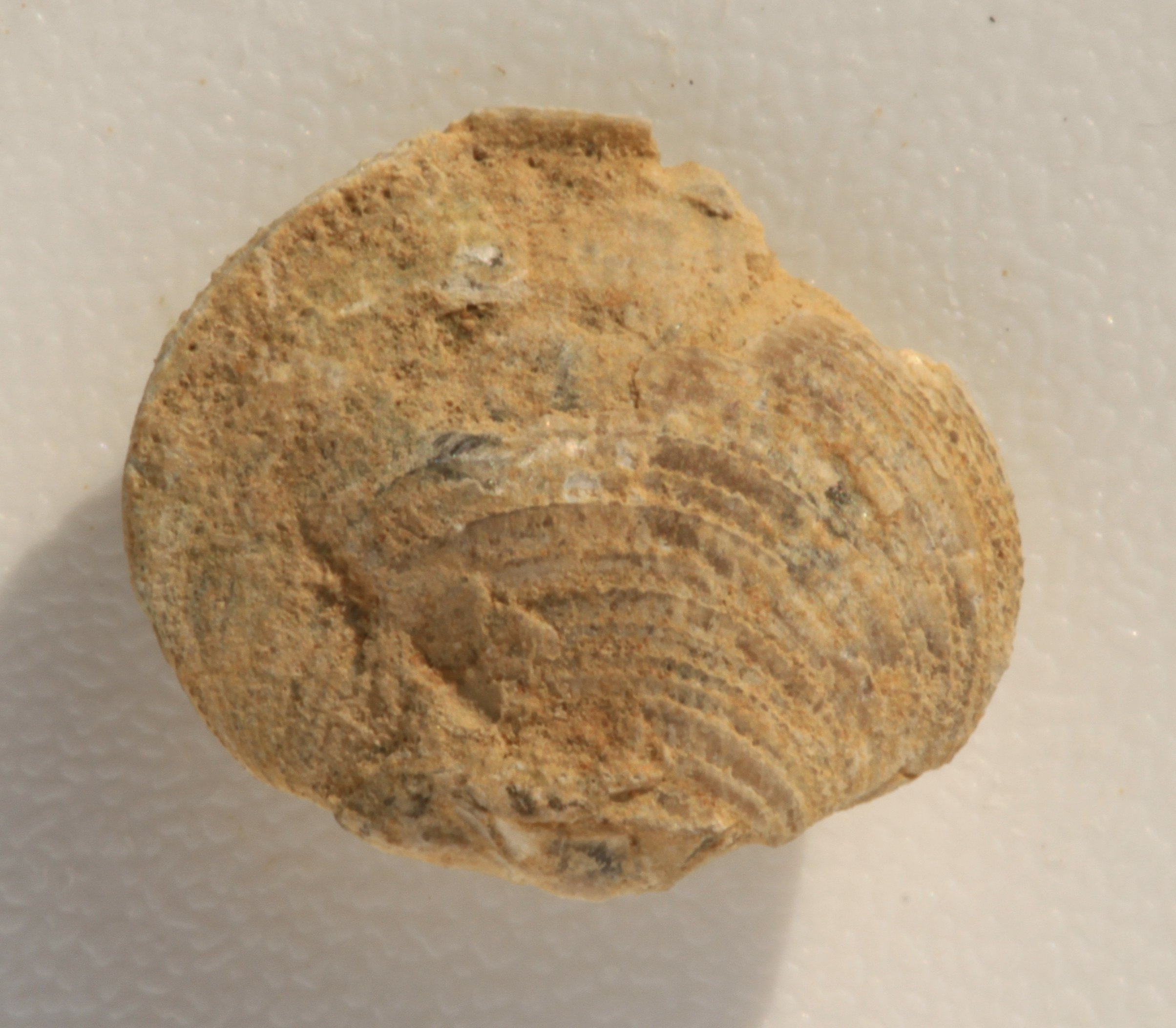
- Fossilized shell of the Middle Devonian-Permian brachiopod Cleiothyridina
  †Cleiothyridina
  - †Cleiothyridina incrassata
  - †Cleiothyridina obmaxima
  - †Cleiothyridina orbicularis
  - †Cleiothyridina tenuilineata
- †Cleiothyris
- †Cliffia
  - †Cliffia lataeganae
  - †Cliffia lataegenae
  - †Cliffia wilsoni
- †Cliftonia
  - †Cliftonia tubulistriata
- †Clinopistha
  - †Clinopistha radiata
- †Clycopteris
- †Coenocystis
  - †Coenocystis moreyi – type locality for species
- †Coledium
  - †Coledium bisinuata
- †Colpites
  - †Colpites minutus
  - †Colpites monilifera
- †Comanchia
  - †Comanchia amplooculata
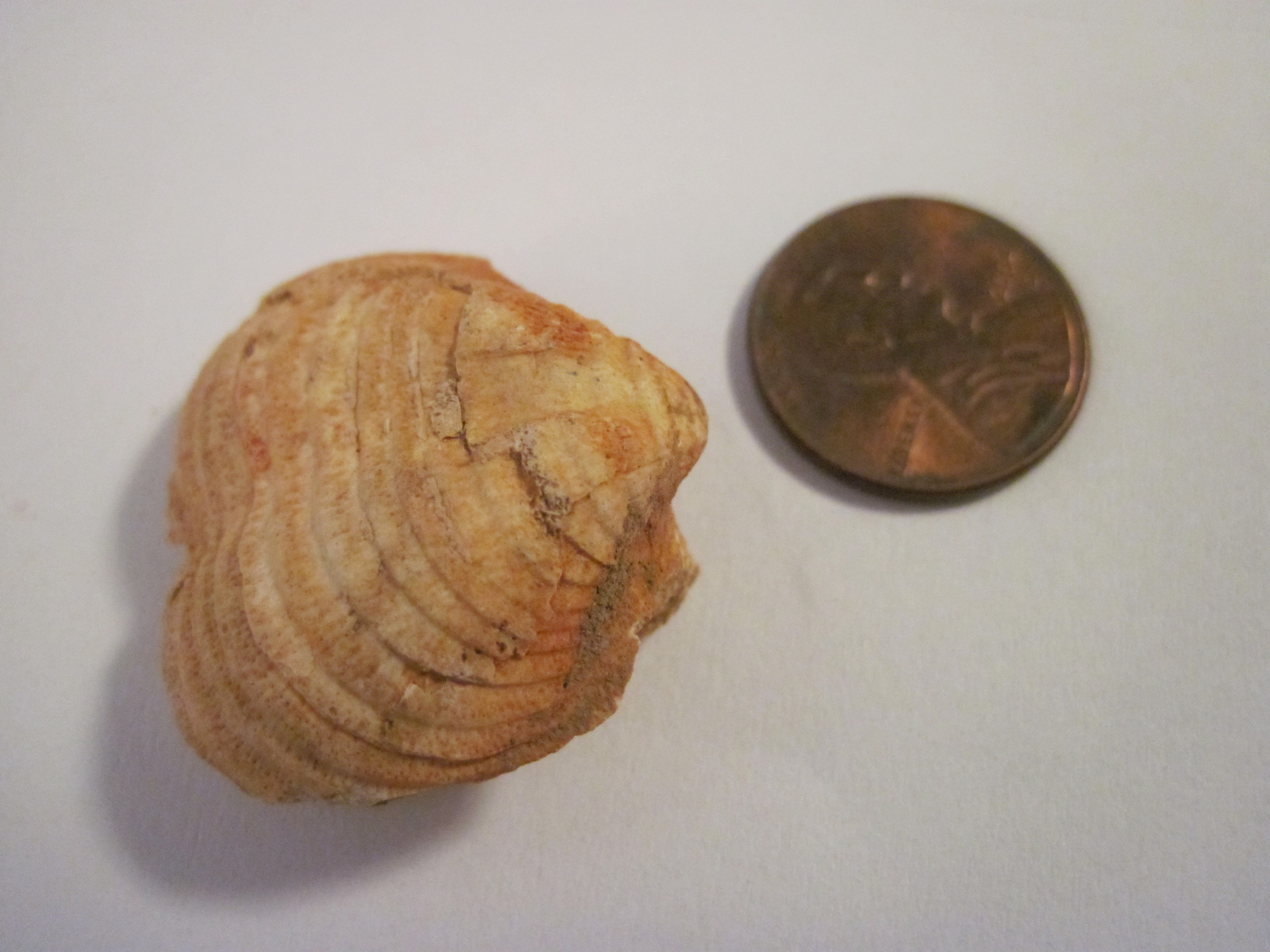
- Fossilized shell of the Late Devonian-Permian brachiopod Composita
  †Composita
  - †Composita elongata
  - †Composita ovata
  - †Composita pikensis – type locality for species
  - †Composita subtilita
  - †Composita tetralobata
- †Conaspis
  - †Conaspis perseus – or unidentified comparable form
- †Condrathyris
  - †Condrathyris perplexa
- †Conocardium
  - †Conocardium formosum – type locality for species
  - †Conocardium spinalatum – type locality for species
- †Conodia – type locality for genus
  - †Conodia acuminata – type locality for species
  - †Conodia levicosta – type locality for species
- †Conopoterium
  - †Conopoterium effusum
- †Conularia
  - †Conularia marionensis
  - †Conularia trentonensis
- †Convolutispora
- †Cooleyella
  - †Cooleyella cuspidata – type locality for species
  - †Cooleyella peculiaris – type locality for species
  - †Cooleyella quadrilobata – type locality for species
  - †Cooleyella spatulata – type locality for species
- †Coolinia
  - †Coolinia convexa
- †Cooperella – type locality for genus
  - †Cooperella eroda – type locality for species
  - †Cooperella rectistriata – type locality for species
  - †Cooperella selluliformis – type locality for species
  - †Cooperella striatula – type locality for species
  - †Cooperella subsulcata – type locality for species
  - †Cooperella typicalis – type locality for species
- †Cordaianthus
- †Cordaicarpus
  - †Cordaicarpus lineatus
- †Cordaites
  - †Cordaites communis
  - †Cordaites costatus – or unidentified comparable form
  - †Cordaites crassinervis
  - †Cordaites principalis
- †Cordylocrinus – report made of unidentified related form or using admittedly obsolete nomenclature
  - †Cordylocrinus dubius
- †Cornuella – type locality for genus
  - †Cornuella parva – type locality for species
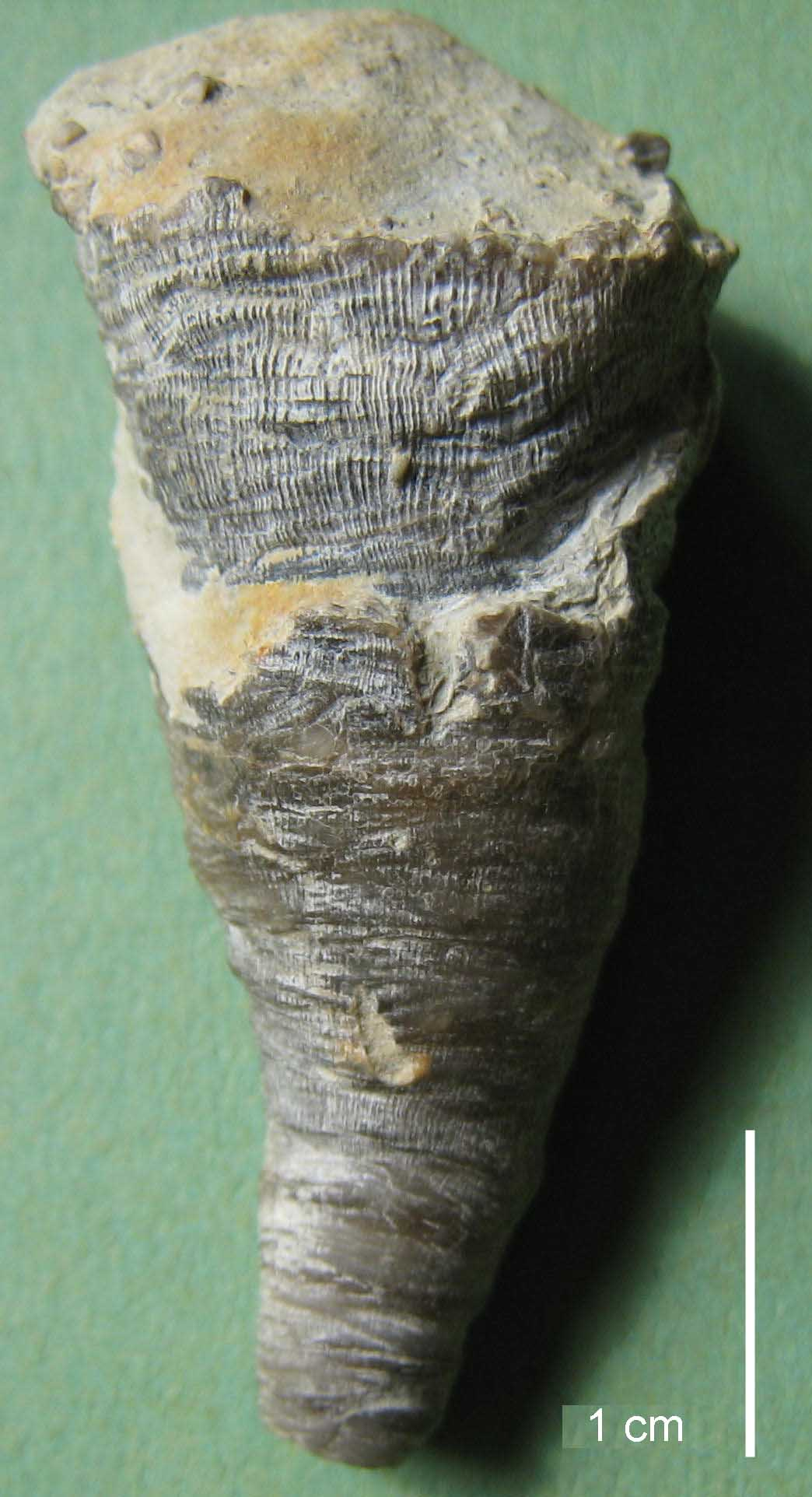
- Fossil of the Middle Ordovician-Carboniferous horn coral Cornulites
  †Cornulites
  - †Cornulites carbonarius
- †Cranaena
  - †Cranaena calvini
  - †Cranaena decepta
  - †Cranaena elia
  - †Cranaena globosa
  - †Cranaena hannibalensis – or unidentified related form
  - †Cranaena iowensis – or unidentified comparable form
  - †Cranaena littletonenesis
  - †Cranaena romingeri
  - †Cranaena subglobosa
  - †Cranaena subovata
- †Crania
  - †Crania dodgei
  - †Crania rowleyi
- †Crassispora
  - †Crassispora kosankei
- †Cremacrinus
- †Crepipora
  - †Crepipora globulifera – type locality for species
- †Crurithyris
  - †Crurithyris laevicula
  - †Crurithyris planoconvexa
- †Cryptothyrella
  - †Cryptothyrella ovoides
- †Ctenodonta
  - †Ctenodonta auburnensis – type locality for species
  - †Ctenodonta concinna
  - †Ctenodonta costata – type locality for species
  - †Ctenodonta medialis
  - †Ctenodonta nasuta
  - †Ctenodonta oviformis
- †Cupularostrum
  - †Cupularostrum annae
  - †Cupularostrum contracta
  - †Cupularostrum gregeri
  - †Cupularostrum omaliusi
- †Curtognathus
- †Cyathocystis
- †Cyclogranisporites
  - †Cyclogranisporites aureus
  - †Cyclogranisporites microgranus
  - †Cyclogranisporites minutus
  - †Cyclogranisporites obliquus
  - †Cyclogranisporites orbicularis
- †Cyclonema
  - †Cyclonema fasciata
  - †Cyclonema intermedium – type locality for species
  - †Cyclonema textilis
- †Cycloplectoceras
  - †Cycloplectoceras funatum
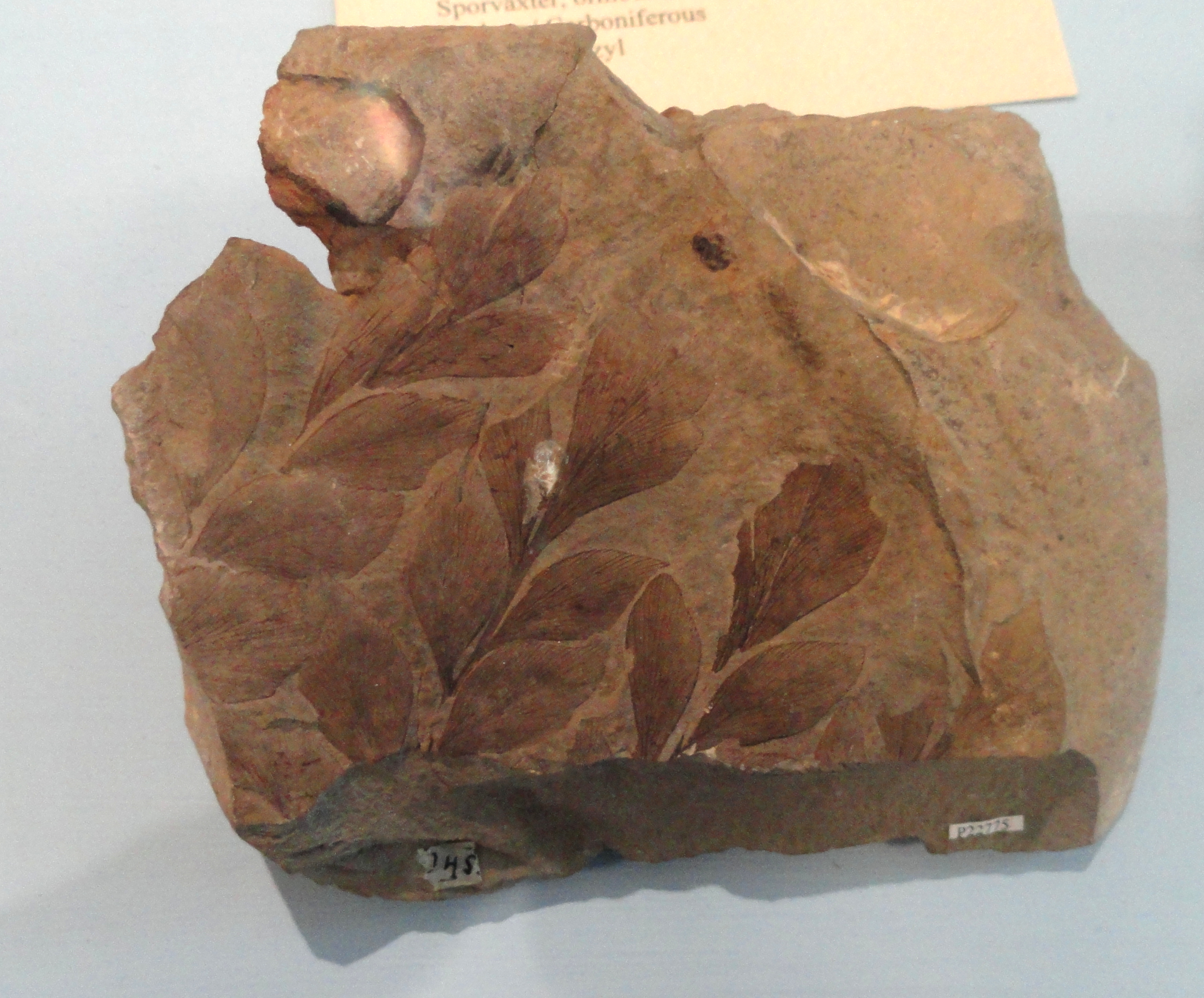
- Fossilized foliage from the Carboniferous seed fern Cyclopteris
  †Cyclopteris
  - †Cyclopteris fimbriata
  - †Cyclopteris trichomanoides
- †Cyclozyga – type locality for genus
  - †Cyclozyga carinata – type locality for species
  - †Cyclozyga mirabilis – type locality for species
- †Cymatonota – tentative report
- †Cymatospira
  - †Cymatospira montfortianus
- †Cyphaspis
  - †Cyphaspis globosus
- †Cypricardella
  - †Cypricardella bellistriata
  - †Cypricardella gregaria
- †Cyrtina
  - †Cyrtina acutirostris
  - †Cyrtina burlingtonensis
  - †Cyrtina triquetra
  - †Cyrtina umbonata
- †Cyrtinia
  - †Cyrtinia acutirostris
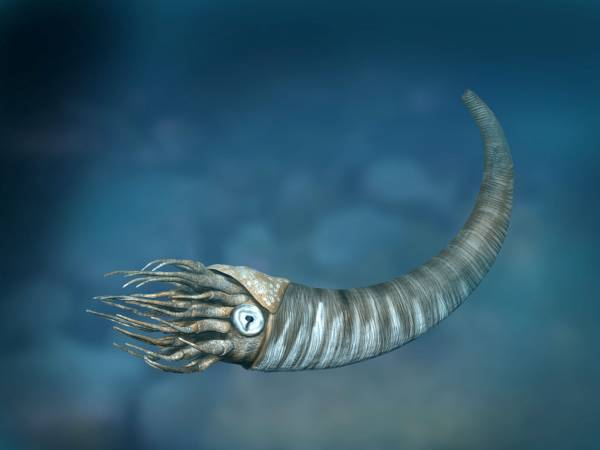
- Restoration of the Cambrian-Middle Devonian nautiloid cephalopod Cyrtoceras
  †Cyrtoceras
- †Cyrtocerina
  - †Cyrtocerina foerstei – type locality for species
  - †Cyrtocerina kimmswickense – type locality for species
- †Cyrtodonta
  - †Cyrtodonta blllingsi
  - †Cyrtodonta huronensis
  - †Cyrtodonta sulcata
- †Cyrtolites
  - †Cyrtolites retrorsus
- †Cyrtostropha
  - †Cyrtostropha salteri – type locality for species

== D ==
- †Dalejina
- †Dalmanella
  - †Dalmanella edgewoodensis
  - †Dalmanella testudinaria
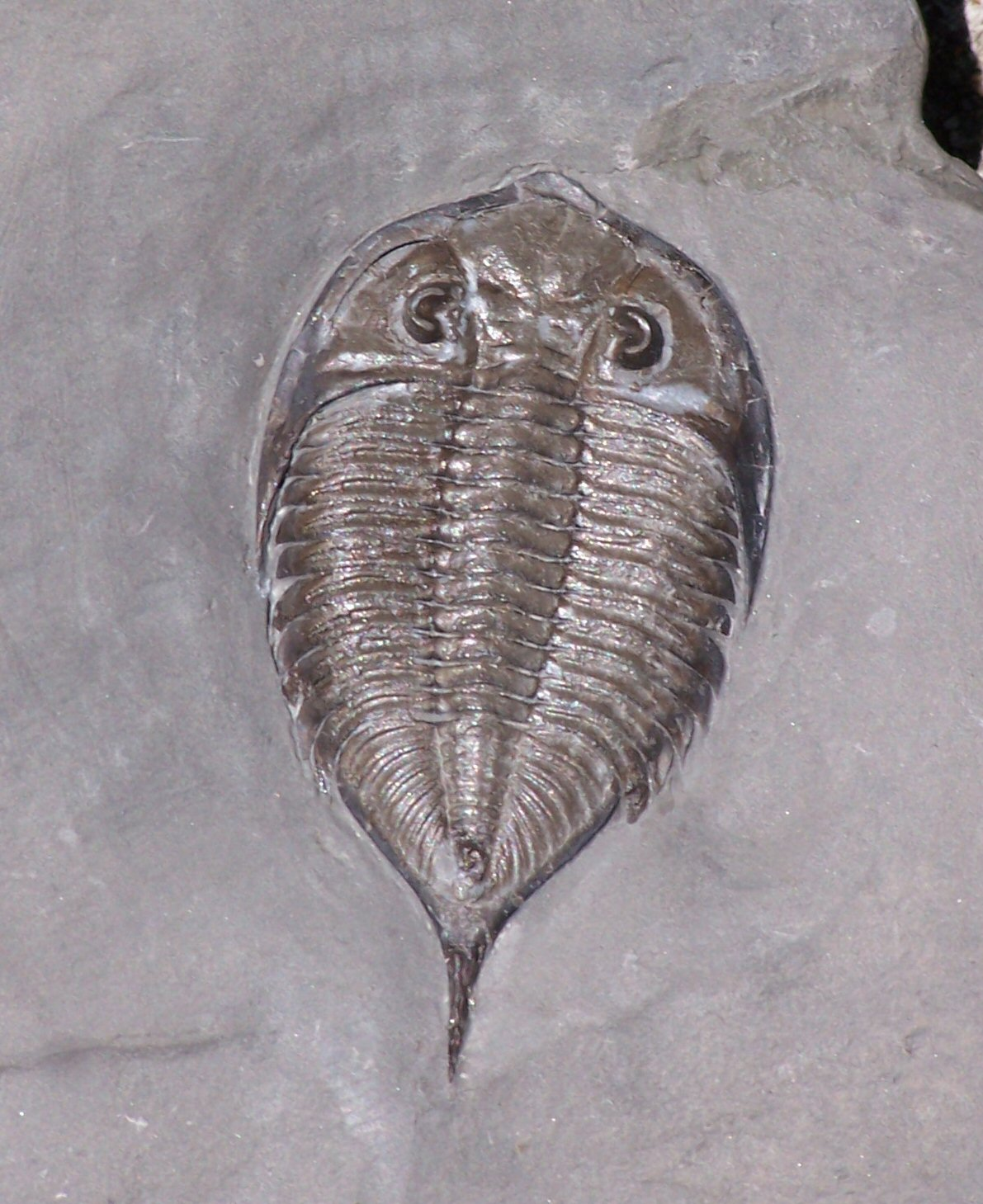
- Fossil of the Late Ordovician-Middle Devonian trilobite Dalmanites
  †Dalmanites
- †Deadwoodia
  - †Deadwoodia panope
- †Deckera
  - †Deckera aldenensis – or unidentified comparable form
  - †Deckera aldeuensis – or unidentified comparable form
- †Della
  - †Della suada
- †Dellea
  - †Dellea saratogensis
  - †Dellea snada
  - †Dellea suada
- †Delthyris
  - †Delthyris clarksvillensis
- †Deltoidospora
  - †Deltoidospora grandis
  - †Deltoidospora levis
  - †Deltoidospora priddyi
  - †Deltoidospora subadnatoides
- †Densosporites
  - †Densosporites triangularis
- †Derbyia
  - †Derbyia crassa
- †Desmacriocrinus – tentative report
- †Desmoinesia
  - †Desmoinesia muricatina
  - †Desmoinesia nana
- †Desquamatia
  - †Desquamatia independensis
- †Diaphoroceras
  - †Diaphoroceras avaense
  - †Diaphoroceras buffaloense
- †Diceromyonia – tentative report
  - †Diceromyonia sera
- †Dichostreblocrinus
  - †Dichostreblocrinus minutus – type locality for species
- †Dicoelosia
  - †Dicoelosia oklahomensis – or unidentified comparable form
- †Dictyoclostus
  - †Dictyoclostus gallatinensis
  - †Dictyoclostus hermosanus
- †Dictyopteris
  - †Dictyopteris squarrosa
- †Dielasma
  - †Dielasma bovidens
- †Dielasmella
  - †Dielasmella compressa
- †Dimeropyge
  - †Dimeropyge tumidus
- †Dimorphoceras
  - †Dimorphoceras politum
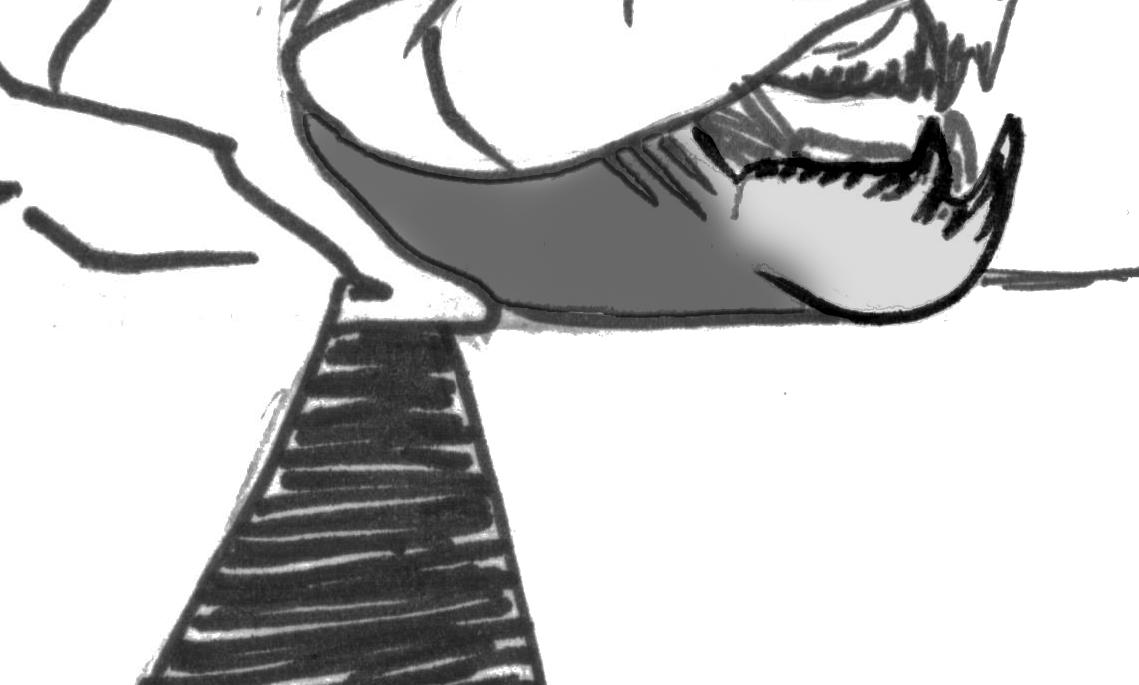
- Illustration of the jaws of Dinichthys
  †Dinichthys
- †Diparelasma
  - †Diparelasma extensum – or unidentified comparable form
  - †Diparelasma type locality for species – informal
- †Diplododella
- †Diplothmema
  - †Diplothmema furcatum
  - †Diplothmema geniculatum
  - †Diplothmema obtusiloba
- †Dokimocephalus
- †Dolerorthis
  - †Dolerorthis savagei
- †Dolichoharpes
  - †Dolichoharpes uniserialis
- †Domatoceras
- †Donaldiella
  - †Donaldiella cicelia
- †Donaldina
  - †Donaldina robusta
  - †Donaldina stevensana
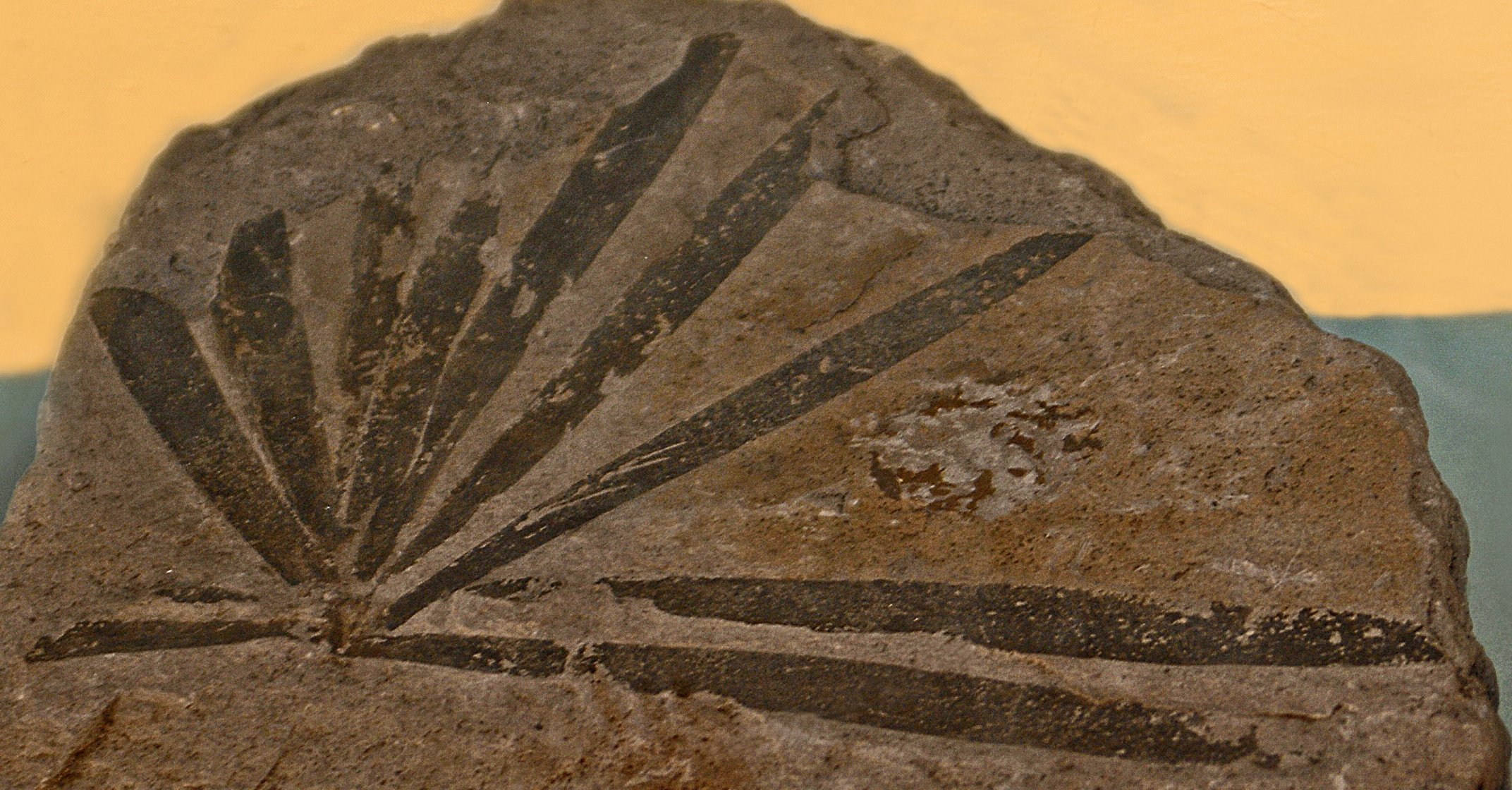
- Fossilized leaves of the Carboniferous-Permian gymnosperm Dorycordaites
  †Dorycordaites
  - †Dorycordaites palmaeformis
- †Dorycrinus
  - †Dorycrinus gouldi
  - †Dorycrinus mississippiensis
- †Drabia
  - †Drabia acroccipita
  - †Drabia curtoccipita
- †Drepanoistodus
  - †Drepanoistodus suberectus

== E ==
- †Earlandia
- †Echinopustulus – type locality for genus
  - †Echinopustulus samuelnelsoni – type locality for species
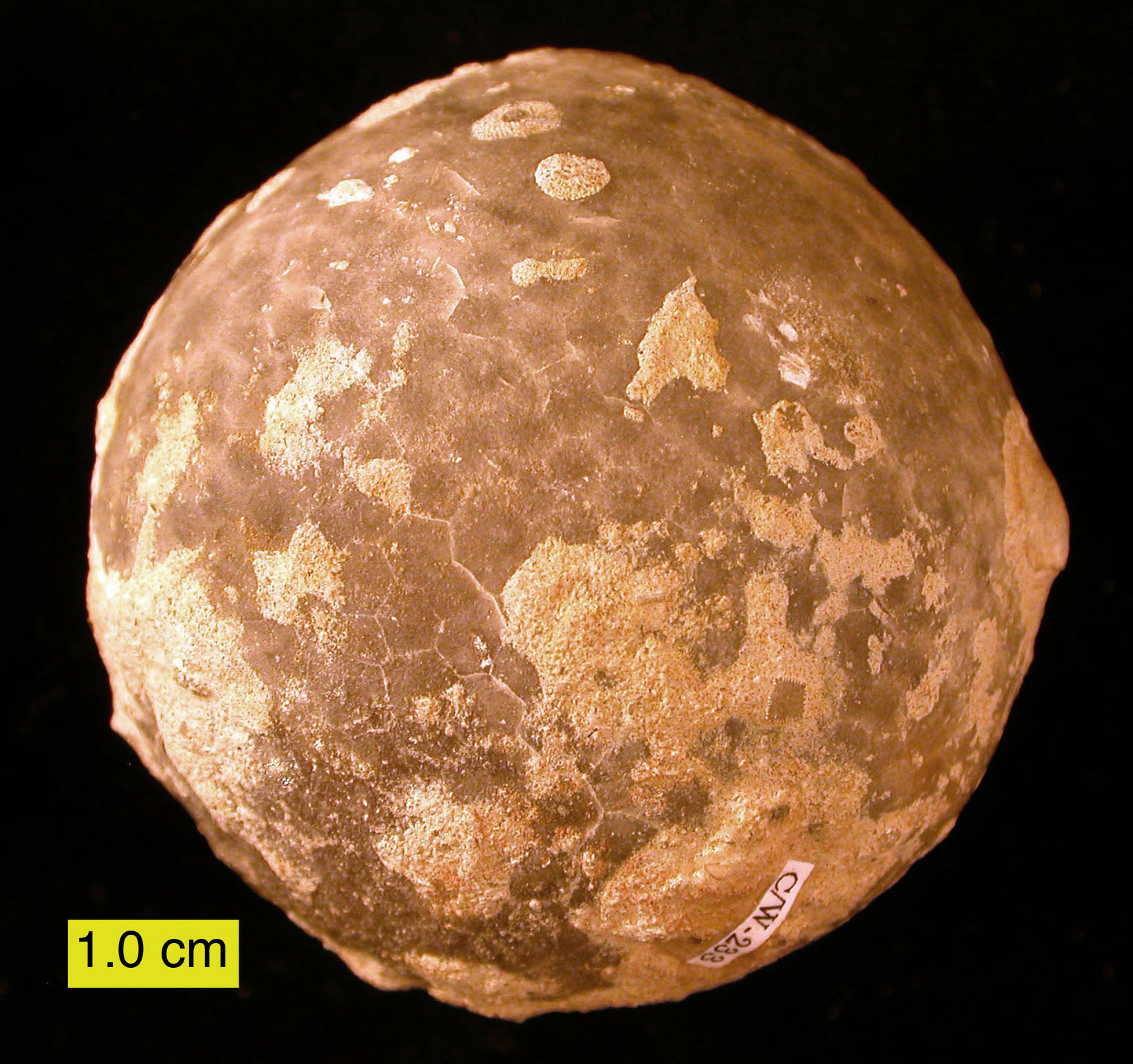
- Fossil of the Early-Middle Ordovician cystoid echinoderm Echinosphaerites
  †Echinosphaerites
  - †Echinosphaerites aurantium
- †Ectogrammysia
  - †Ectogrammysia hannibalensis
- †Ectomaria
  - †Ectomaria adventa
- †Edithiella
  - †Edithiella missouriensis – type locality for species
- †Edmondia
  - †Edmondia aspinwallensis
  - †Edmondia ovata
- †Elita
  - †Elita subundifera
- †Ellesmeroceras
  - †Ellesmeroceras higdonense
- †Elliptophillipsia
  - †Elliptophillipsia ellipticus
  - †Elliptophillipsia rotundus – type locality for species
- †Elvinia
  - †Elvinia roemeri
- †Elyaspis
  - †Elyaspis missouriensis – type locality for species
- †Emphereaster
  - †Emphereaster missouriensis
- †Endocycloceras
  - †Endocycloceras subcurvatum
- †Endosporites
  - †Endosporites globiformis
- †Eobronteus
  - †Eobronteus slocomi
- Eocaudina
  - †Eocaudina mccormacki
  - †Eocaudina subhexagona
- †Eochonetes
  - †Eochonetes johnsonella – type locality for species
- †Eodictyonella (formerly Dictyonella)
  - †Eodictyonella gibbosa
- †Eohalysiocrinus
- †Eoleperditia – tentative report
- †Eolissochonetes
  - †Eolissochonetes bilobatus
  - †Eolissochonetes laevis
- †Eomonorachus
  - †Eomonorachus intermedius
- †Eoprodromites
  - †Eoprodromites kinderhooki
- †Eopteria
  - †Eopteria richardsoni
- †Eoptychia – tentative report
  - †Eoptychia intermittens
- †Eoschizodus – tentative report
  - †Eoschizodus chemungensis
- †Eospirifer
- †Eospirigerina
  - †Eospirigerina putilla
- †Eosyringothyris
  - †Eosyringothyris aspera
  - †Eosyringothyris occidentalis
  - †Eosyringothyris triangularis
- †Eotomaria
  - †Eotomaria dryope
- †Eperisocrinus
  - †Eperisocrinus missouriensis
- †Eremopteris
  - †Eremopteris bilobata
- †Escharopora
  - †Escharopora patens
- †Euchondria – tentative report
  - †Euchondria pellucida
- †Euconia
  - †Euconia conicus
  - †Euconia umbilicata
- †Eumetria
  - †Eumetria perstrialis
- †Eunema
  - †Eunema concinnula
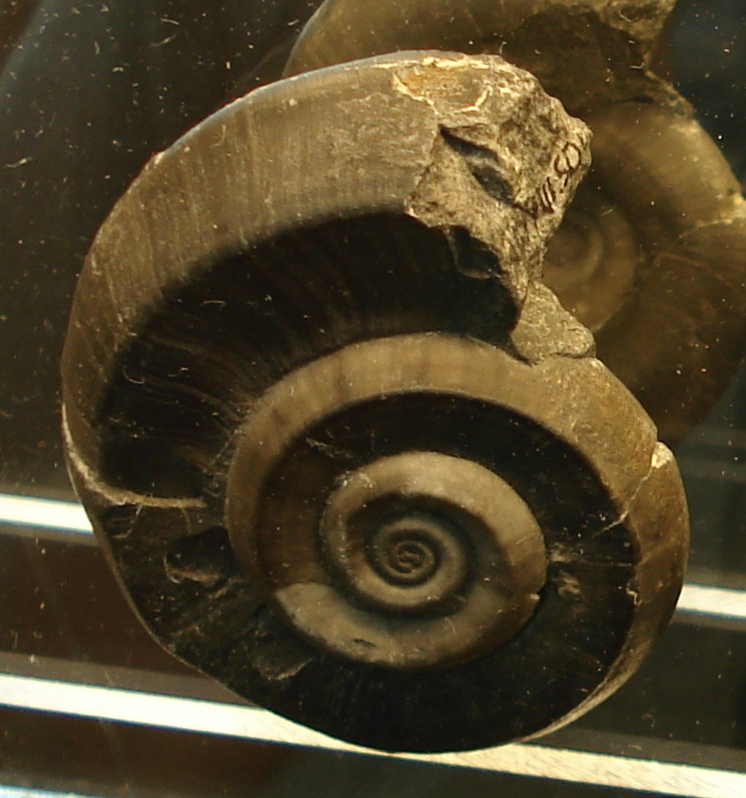
- Fossilized shell of the Silurian-Permian sea snail Euomphalus
  †Euomphalus
  - †Euomphalus missouriensis – type locality for species
  - †Euomphalus pernodosus – tentative report
  - †Euomphalus umbilicatus
- †Euphemites
  - †Euphemites carbonarius
  - †Euphemites nodocarinatus
- †Euprioniodina
- †Eurystomites
  - †Eurystomites avensis

== F ==
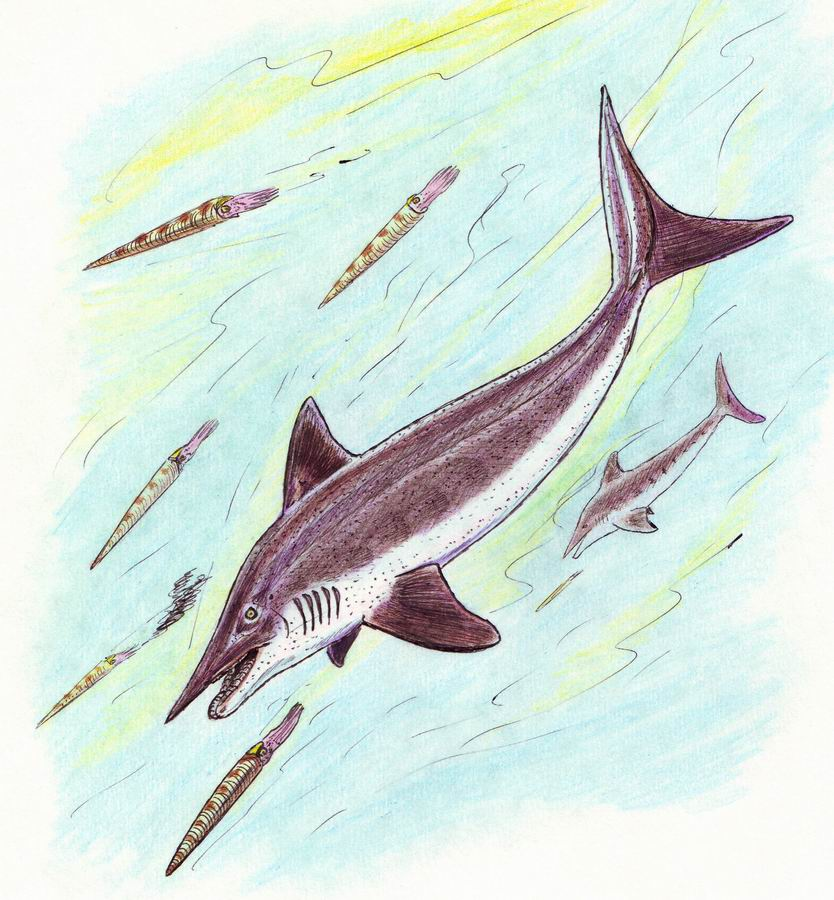
- Life restoration of the Permian Chimaera relative Fadenia
  †Fadenia
  - †Fadenia gigas – type locality for species
- †Fandasterias
- †Fasciculiconcha
  - †Fasciculiconcha knighti – tentative report
- †Favosites
- †Fenestrellina
- †Finkelnburgia
  - †Finkelnburgia missouriensis
- †Fistulipora
  - †Fistulipora zonata
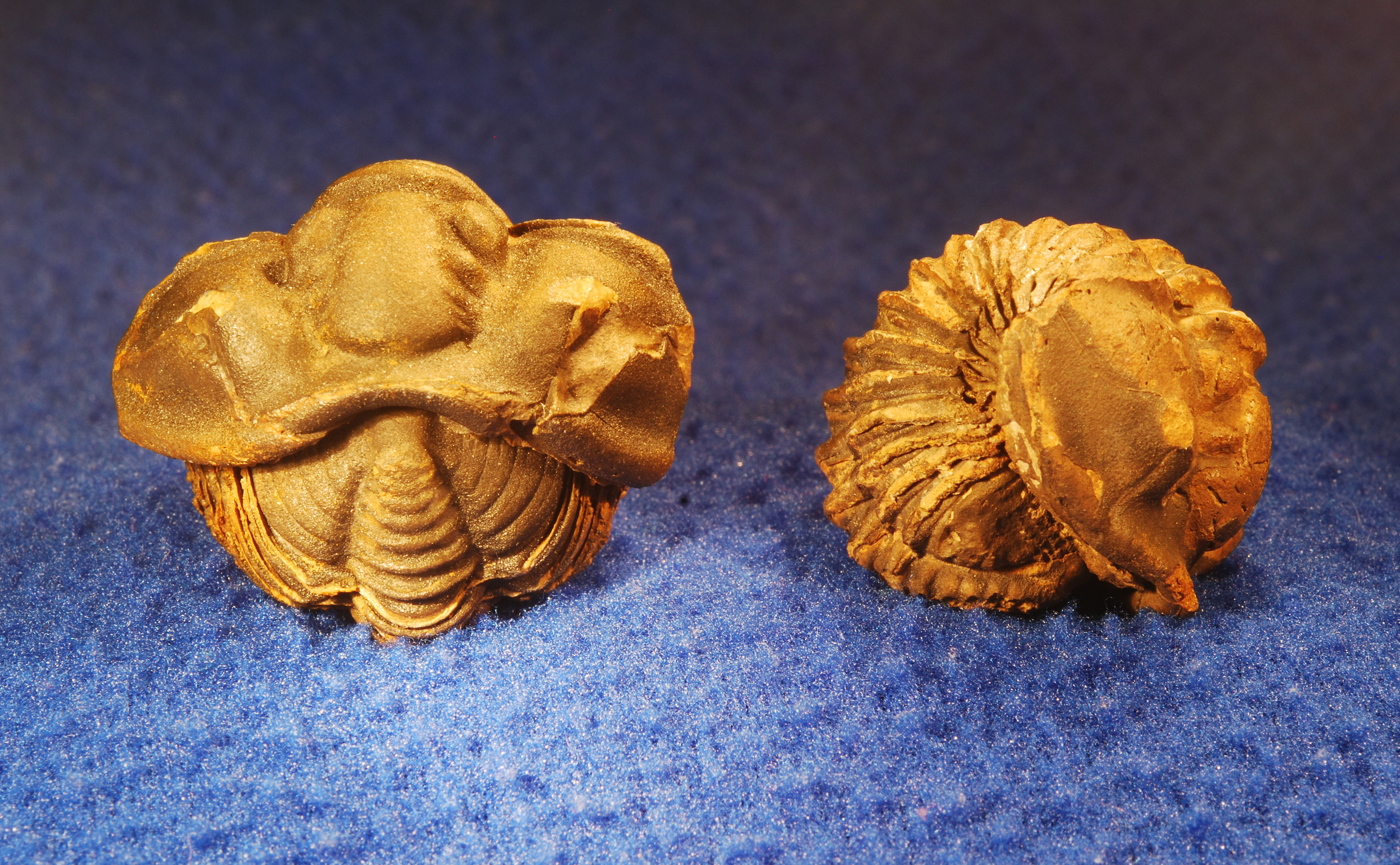
- Front (left) and right side (right) views of an enrolled fossil of the Middle Ordovician-Silurian trilobite Flexicalymene
  †Flexicalymene
  - †Flexicalymene senaria
- †Florinites
  - †Florinites mediapudens
  - †Florinites visendus
  - †Florinites volans
- †Fortscottella
  - †Fortscottella gemmicula – type locality for species
- †Fusispira
  - †Fusispira obesus

== G ==
- †Gacina
  - †Gacina emaciata
- †Gamizyga
  - †Gamizyga corpulentissima – type locality for species
  - †Gamizyga expansa – type locality for species
  - †Gamizyga nitida – type locality for species
- †Gasconadeoconus
  - †Gasconadeoconus ponderosa – type locality for species
  - †Gasconadeoconus waynesvillensis – type locality for species
- †Gasconadia
  - †Gasconadia putilla
- †Gayneoconus – type locality for genus
  - †Gayneoconus echolsi – type locality for species
- †Geniculifera
  - †Geniculifera pustulifera
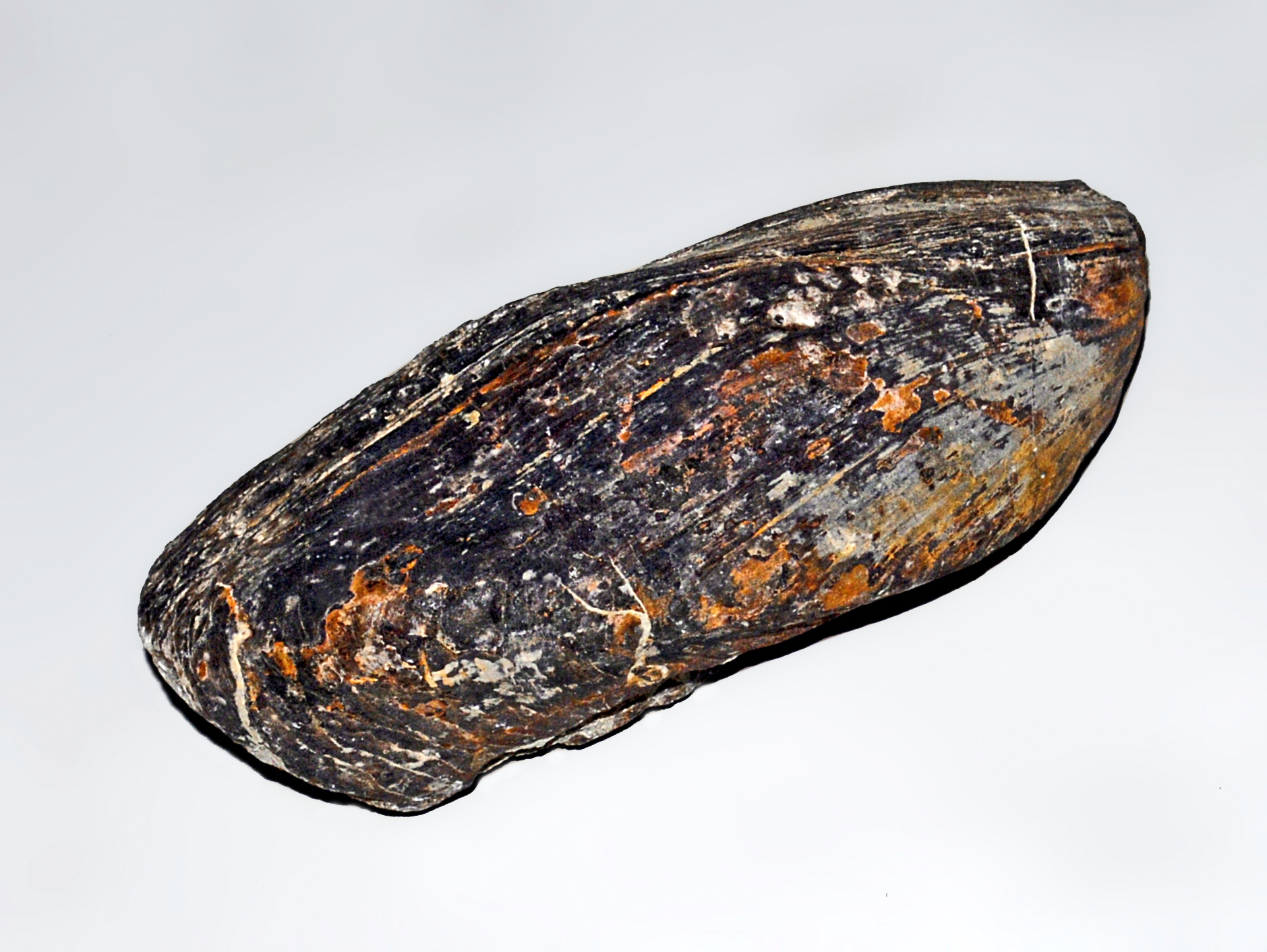
- Fossilized shell of the Carboniferous-Eocene bivalve Gervillia
  †Gervillia
  - †Gervillia longa
- †Girtycoelia
- †Girtyspira
  - †Girtyspira minuta
- †Glabrocingulum
  - †Glabrocingulum grayvillense
- †Glaphyrites
  - †Glaphyrites moorei – type locality for species
  - †Glaphyrites welleri
- †Globacrocrinus
  - †Globacrocrinus centronodus – type locality for species
- †Globodoma
  - †Globodoma spironema
- †Glossina
  - †Glossina lineolata
- †Glyptocystella
- †Glyptorthis
  - †Glyptorthis alta – type locality for species
- †Gnathodus
  - †Gnathodus typicus
- †Gondolella
  - †Gondolella lingulata – type locality for species
  - †Gondolella merrilli – type locality for species
  - †Gondolella sinuata – type locality for species
  - †Gondolella sublanceolata – type locality for species
- †Goniasma
  - †Goniasma lasallense
- †Goniocyclus
  - †Goniocyclus hannibalensis – type locality for species
- †Gonioloboceratoides
  - †Gonioloboceratoides eliasi – type locality for species
- †Goniophora
  - †Goniophora carinata
- †Gosseletina
  - †Gosseletina persimplex
  - †Gosseletina pratteni – tentative report
- †Grammysia
  - †Grammysia elliptica
- †Granulatisporites
  - †Granulatisporites adnatoides
  - †Granulatisporites minutus
  - †Granulatisporites pallidus
- †Griffithidella
- †Grypocrinus
- †Gryptochiton – tentative report
  - †Gryptochiton anomalus
- †Gunnellodus – type locality for genus
  - †Gunnellodus bellistriatus – type locality for species
- †Gypidula
  - †Gypidula marionensis
  - †Gypidula mineolaensis

== H ==
- †Hadrorhynchia
  - †Hadrorhynchia solon
- †Hagnocrinus
  - †Hagnocrinus bainbridgensis – type locality for species
  - †Hagnocrinus balli – type locality for species
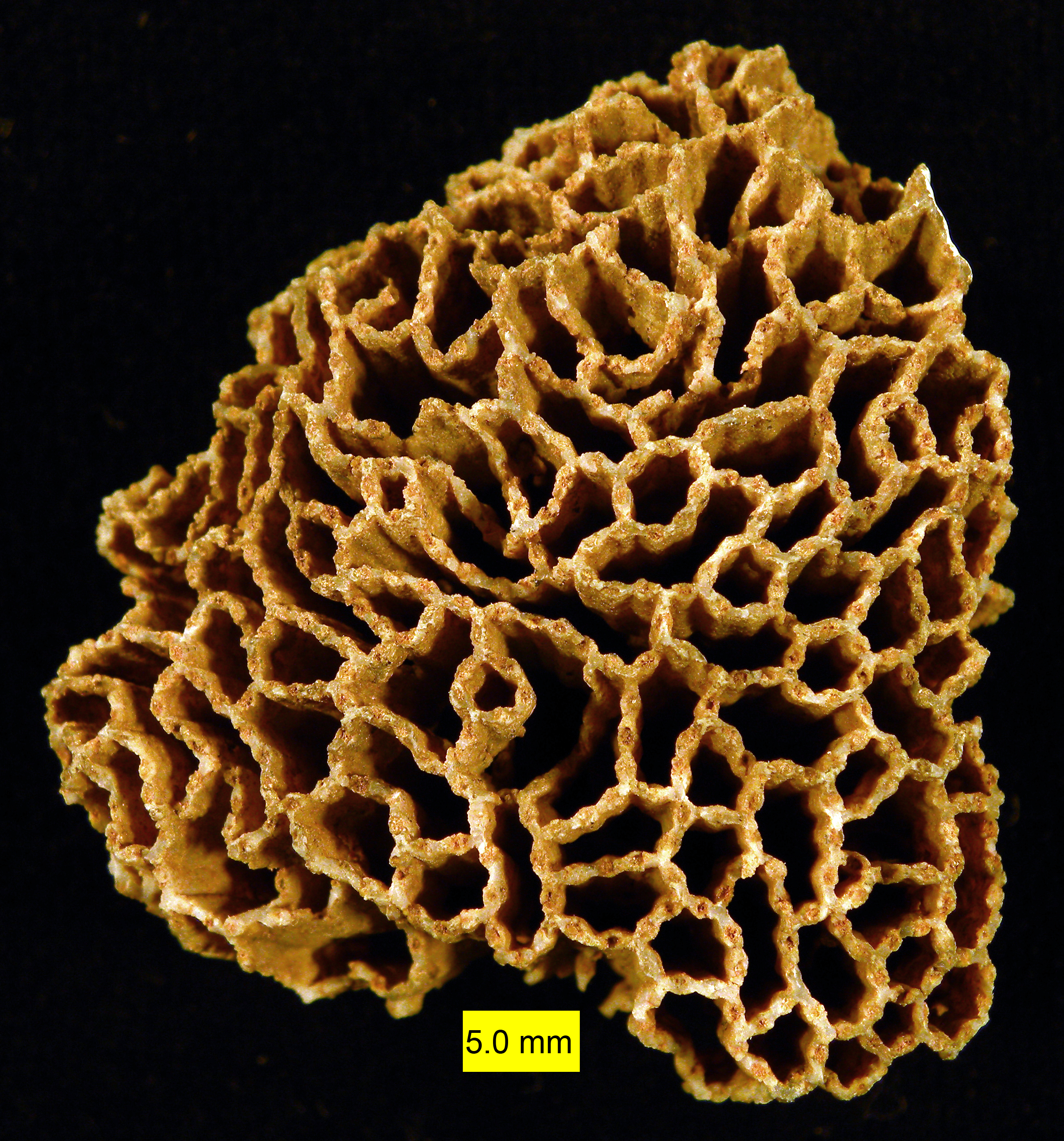
- Fossil of the Ordovician-Silurian tabulate coral Halysites
  †Halysites
- †Hamburgia
  - †Hamburgia typa
- †Helcionopsis
- †Helicotoma
  - †Helicotoma missouriensis – type locality for species
  - †Helicotoma planulata
  - †Helicotoma tennesseensis
- †Helminthozyga – type locality for genus
  - †Helminthozyga vermiculus – type locality for species
- †Hemiarges
  - †Hemiarges bartoni
  - †Hemiarges leviculus
- †Hemimylacris
  - †Hemimylacris clintoniana – type locality for species
- †Hemithecella – type locality for genus
  - †Hemithecella abrupta
  - †Hemithecella eminensis – type locality for species
  - †Hemithecella expansa
  - †Hemithecella quinquelites – type locality for species
- †Hemizgya
  - †Hemizgya filicosta – type locality for species
- †Hemizyga
  - †Hemizyga corbis – type locality for species
  - †Hemizyga elegans
  - †Hemizyga illineata – type locality for species
  - †Hemizyga inflata – type locality for species
- †Hesperorthis
  - †Hesperorthis tricenaria
- †Heteralosia
  - †Heteralosia beecheri
- †Hibbardella
- †Hindia
  - †Hindia parva – tentative report
- †Hirnantia
  - †Hirnantia noixella – type locality for species
- †Hirneacrinus
- †Hiscobeccus – tentative report
  - †Hiscobeccus capax
- †Holcospermum
- †Holia – type locality for genus
  - †Holia magnaspina – type locality for species
- †Holmesella
  - †Holmesella elongata – type locality for species
  - †Holmesella equilaterata – type locality for species
  - †Holmesella ornata – type locality for species
  - †Holmesella parallelata – type locality for species
  - †Holmesella parallella – type locality for species
  - †Holmesella rhomboidelis – type locality for species
  - †Holmesella speni – type locality for species
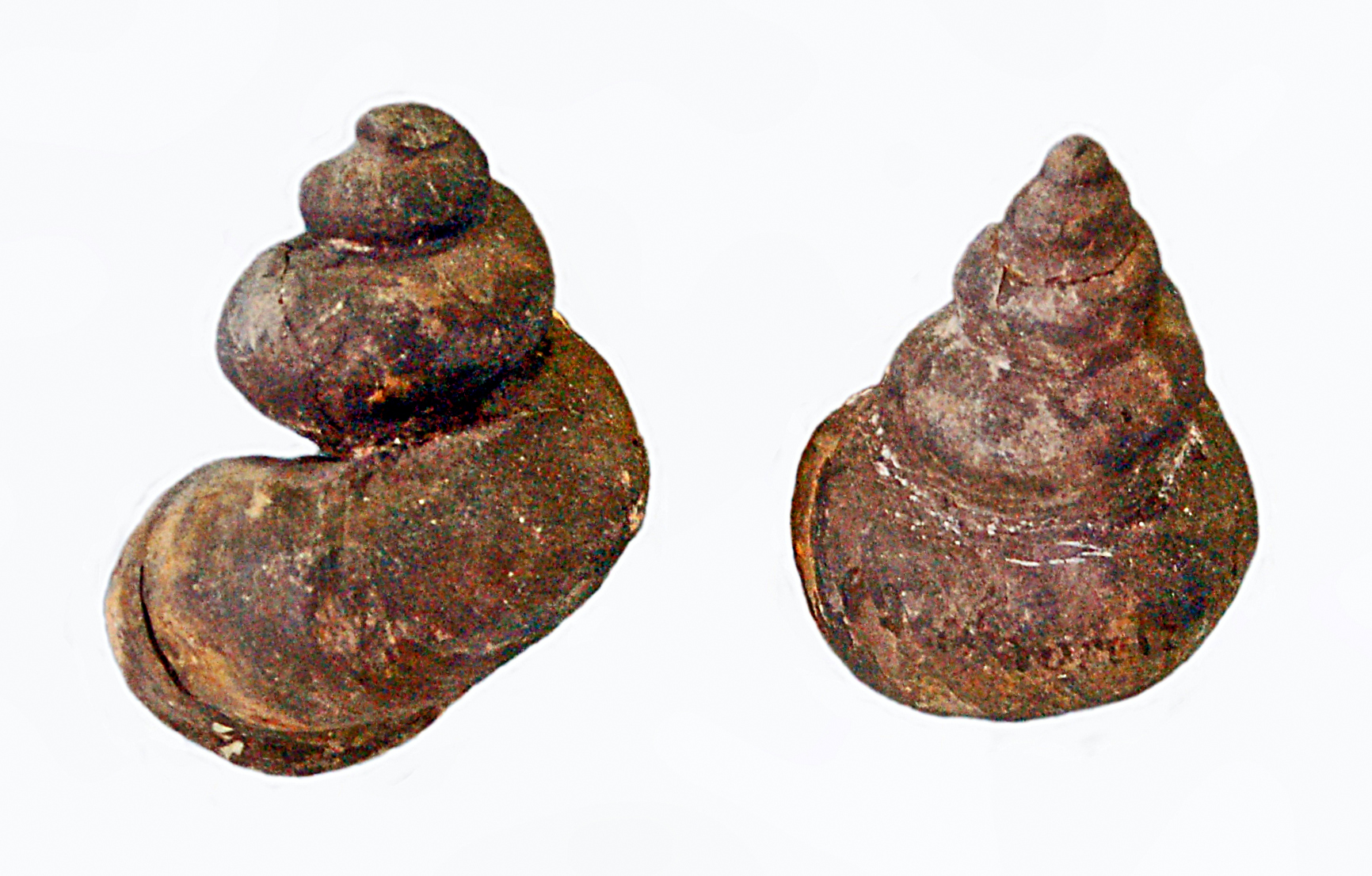
- Fossilized shells of the Ordovician-Carboniferous sea snail Holopea
  †Holopea
  - †Holopea insignis
  - †Holopea missouriensis – type locality for species
- †Homocrinus
- †Homoeospira
  - †Homoeospira fiscellostriata
- †Homotelus
  - †Homotelus laeviurus
- †Hormotoma
  - †Hormotoma anna
  - †Hormotoma artemesia
  - †Hormotoma confusa
  - †Hormotoma cotterensis – type locality for species
  - †Hormotoma dubia
  - †Hormotoma gracilis
  - †Hormotoma lutiensis – type locality for species
- †Housia
  - †Housia ovata
- †Hustedia
  - †Hustedia mormoni
  - †Hustedia pygmaea
- †Hybocrinus
  - †Hybocrinus conicus
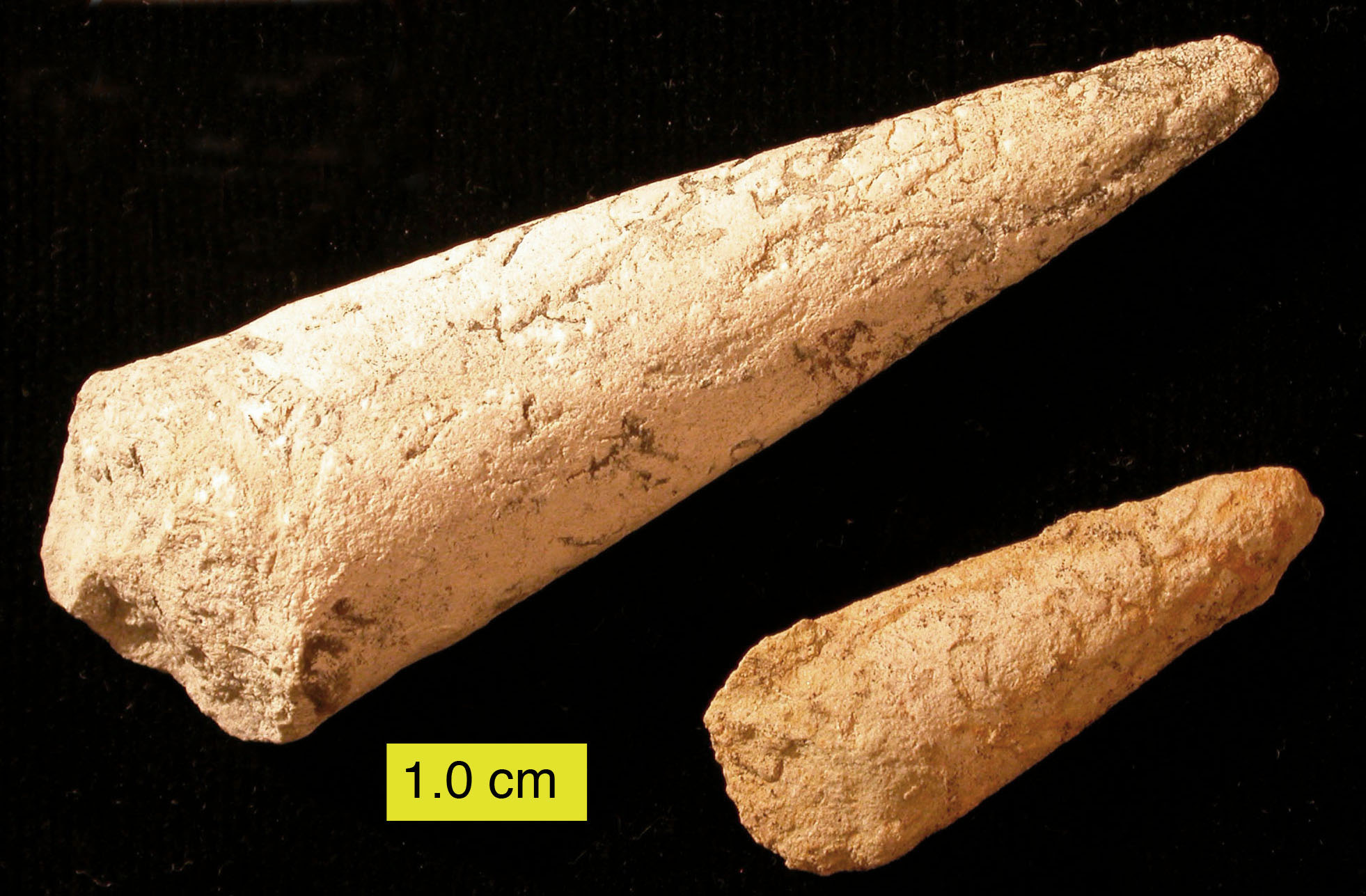
- Fossilized shells of the Cambrian-Permian brachiopod relative Hyolitha
  †Hyolithes
  - †Hyolithes multicinctus
- †Hypeloconus
  - †Hypeloconus recurvus
- †Hyphantozyga
  - †Hyphantozyga gracilis – type locality for species
- †Hypseloconus
  - †Hypseloconus bessemerense
  - †Hypseloconus bonneterrense – type locality for species
  - †Hypseloconus compressus
  - †Hypseloconus ozarkensis
  - †Hypseloconus recurvus
  - †Hypseloconus type locality for species – informal
- †Hystriculina
- †Hystricurus
  - †Hystricurus deflectus – type locality for species
  - †Hystricurus elevatus

== I ==
- †Ianthinopsis
  - †Ianthinopsis medialis
- †Iddingsia
  - †Iddingsia missouriensis
- †Idiognathodus
  - †Idiognathodus biconvexus – type locality for species
  - †Idiognathodus biliratus – type locality for species
  - †Idiognathodus binodosus – type locality for species
  - †Idiognathodus cancellosus – type locality for species
  - †Idiognathodus cariniferus – type locality for species
  - †Idiognathodus cherryvalensis – type locality for species
  - †Idiognathodus chiriformis – type locality for species
  - †Idiognathodus cicatricosus – type locality for species
  - †Idiognathodus clavatus – type locality for species
  - †Idiognathodus confragus – type locality for species
  - †Idiognathodus corrugatus – type locality for species
  - †Idiognathodus cuneiformis – type locality for species
  - †Idiognathodus erodus – type locality for species
  - †Idiognathodus farrelli – type locality for species
  - †Idiognathodus folium – type locality for species
  - †Idiognathodus fusiformis – type locality for species
  - †Idiognathodus fusiformus – type locality for species
  - †Idiognathodus gemmiformis – type locality for species
  - †Idiognathodus harkeyi – type locality for species
  - †Idiognathodus jugosus – type locality for species
  - †Idiognathodus kansensis – type locality for species
  - †Idiognathodus lanceolatus – type locality for species
  - †Idiognathodus liratus – type locality for species
  - †Idiognathodus lobatus – type locality for species
  - †Idiognathodus megistus – type locality for species
  - †Idiognathodus modulatus – type locality for species
  - †Idiognathodus multinodosus – type locality for species
  - †Idiognathodus nodostriatus – type locality for species
  - †Idiognathodus porcatus – type locality for species
  - †Idiognathodus rotundus – type locality for species
  - †Idiognathodus rugulatus – type locality for species
  - †Idiognathodus ruidus – type locality for species
  - †Idiognathodus semipapulatus – type locality for species
  - †Idiognathodus siculus – type locality for species
  - †Idiognathodus simplex – type locality for species
  - †Idiognathodus spathodus – type locality for species
  - †Idiognathodus strigillatus – type locality for species
  - †Idiognathodus sulciferus – type locality for species
  - †Idiognathodus symmetricus – type locality for species
  - †Idiognathodus vadosus – type locality for species
  - †Idiognathodus walteri – type locality for species
  - †Idiognathodus warei – type locality for species
  - †Idiognathodus wintersentensis – type locality for species
  - †Idiognathodus wintersetensis
- †Idioprioniodus – type locality for genus
  - †Idioprioniodus camurus – type locality for species
  - †Idioprioniodus fumishi
  - †Idioprioniodus striatus – type locality for species
  - †Idioprioniodus typus – type locality for species
- †Implicaticystis
  - †Implicaticystis shumardi
  - †Implicaticystis symmetricus
- †Irondalia – type locality for genus
  - †Irondalia irondalensis – type locality for species
- †Irvingella
  - †Irvingella flohri
  - †Irvingella major
- †Ischyrodonta
  - †Ischyrodonta dakei – type locality for species
- †Isochilina
  - †Isochilina variana – type locality for species
- †Isorthis
- †Isorthoceras
  - †Isorthoceras sociale
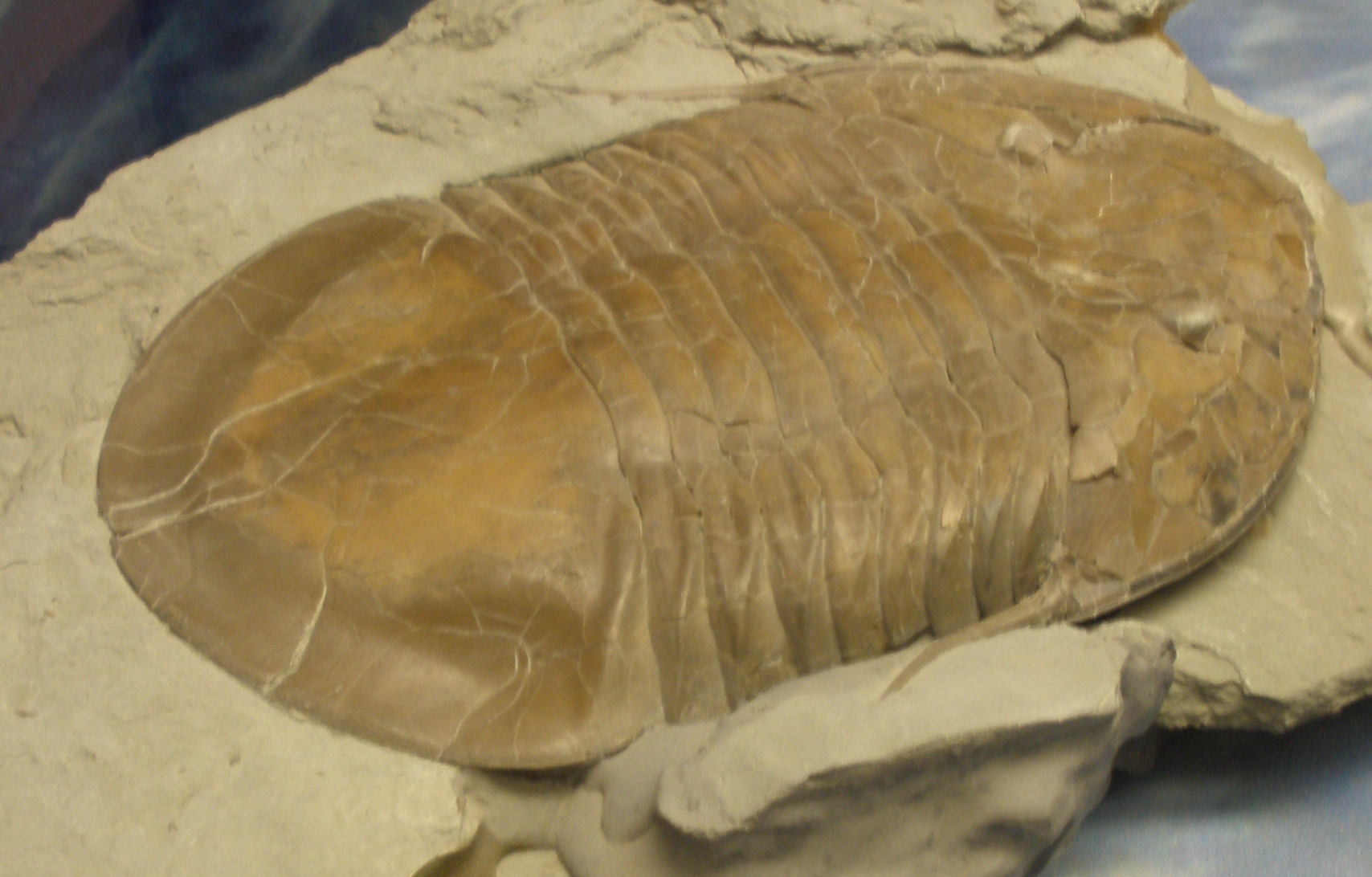
- Fossil of the Middle-Late Ordovician giant trilobite Isotelus.
  †Isotelus
  - †Isotelus bradleyi – tentative report
  - †Isotelus gigas
  - †Isotelus iowensis
  - †Isotelus kimmswickensis
  - †Isotelus maximus

== J ==
- †Jedria
  - †Jedria meeki – type locality for species
  - †Jedria ventrica
- †Jeffersonia
  - †Jeffersonia bridgei – type locality for species

== K ==
- †Kallimorphocrinus
  - †Kallimorphocrinus pristinus – type locality for species
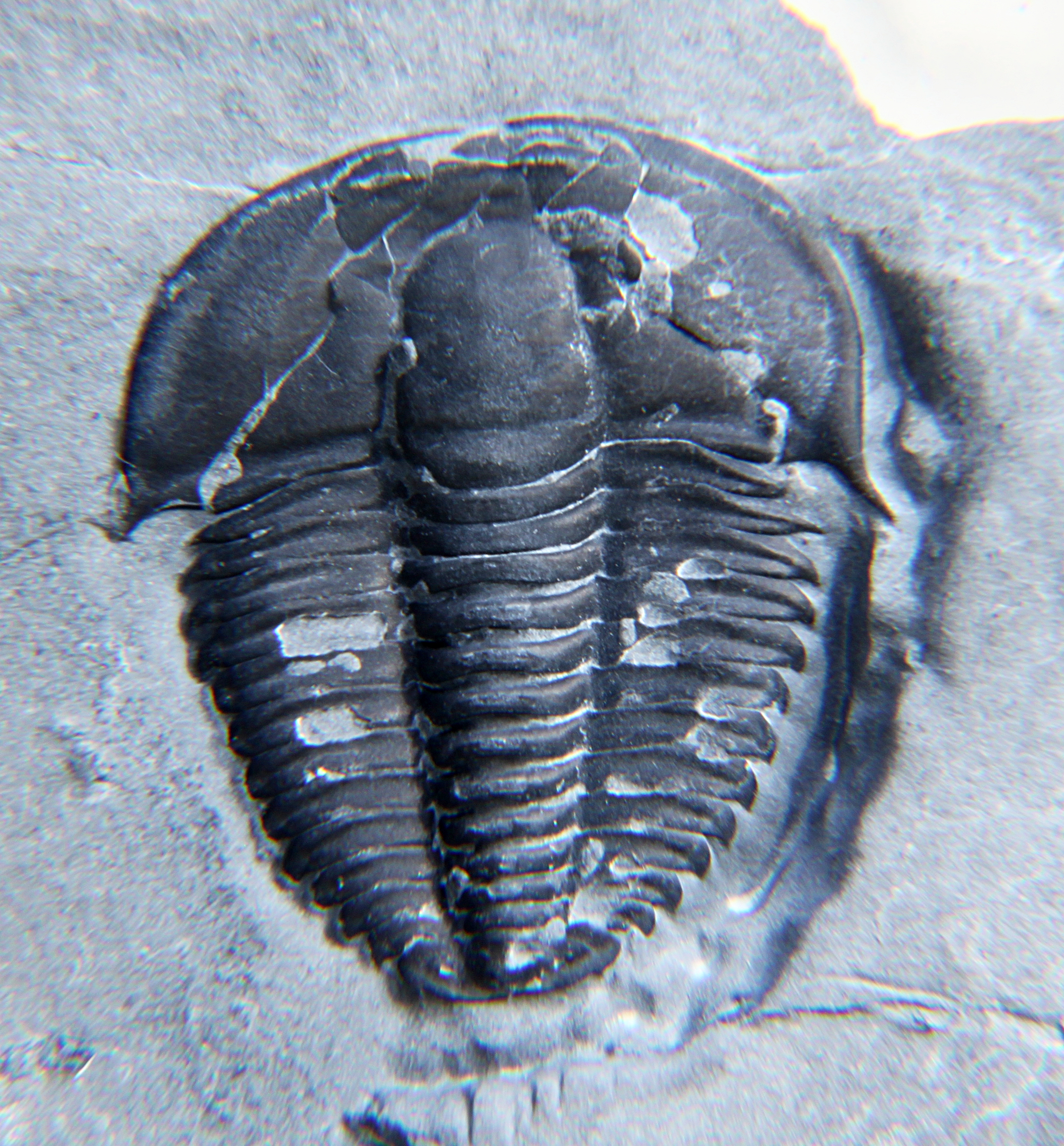
- Fossil of the Cambrian trilobite Kendallina
  †Kendallina
  - †Kendallina biforota – or unidentified comparable form
- †Kewaneesporites
  - †Kewaneesporites patulus
- †Kindbladia
  - †Kindbladia affinis
- †Kirengella
  - †Kirengella expansus – type locality for species
  - †Kirengella oregonensis – type locality for species
  - †Kirengella washingtonense – type locality for species
- †Kirkella – type locality for genus
  - †Kirkella indentata – type locality for species
  - †Kirkella typicalis – type locality for species
- †Knorria
- †Kozlowskia
  - †Kozlowskia haydenensis

== L ==
- †Laevigatosporites
  - †Laevigatosporites desmoinesensis
  - †Laevigatosporites globosus
  - †Laevigatosporites medius
  - †Laevigatosporites ovalis
  - †Laevigatosporites vulgaris
- †Lageniocrinus – tentative report
- †Lampadosocrinus
- †Lampterocrinus
- †Langepis
  - †Langepis campbelli
- †Laphamoceras
  - †Laphamoceras scofieldi
- †Latiendothyra
- †Latosporites
  - †Latosporites minutus
- †Leangella
- †Lecanospira
  - †Lecanospira perplana
  - †Lecanospira soluta – type locality for species
- †Leioclema
- †Leiorhynchus
  - †Leiorhynchus rockymontanum
- †Lepidocyclus
  - †Lepidocyclus oblongus – type locality for species
- †Lepidocystis
  - †Lepidocystis fraxiniformis
- †Lepidophloios
  - †Lepidophloios vaningeni
- †Lepidophyllum
- †Lepidostrobophyllum
  - †Lepidostrobophyllum jenneyi
  - †Lepidostrobophyllum missouriense
- †Leptaena
  - †Leptaena aequalis – type locality for species
  - †Leptaena oklahomensis
- †Leptaenisca
  - †Leptaenisca irregularis – or unidentified comparable form
- †Leptagonia
  - †Leptagonia missouriensis – type locality for species
- †Leptalosia
  - †Leptalosia scintilla
- †Leptodesma
  - †Leptodesma nitida
- †Leptodiscus
  - †Leptodiscus corrugatus
- †Leptoskelidion – type locality for genus
  - †Leptoskelidion septulosum – type locality for species
- †Levizygopleura
  - †Levizygopleura inornata – type locality for species
  - †Levizygopleura trochus – type locality for species
  - †Levizygopleura williamsi – type locality for species
- †Lichenaria
  - †Lichenaria typa – tentative report
- †Limopteria
  - †Limopteria subalata
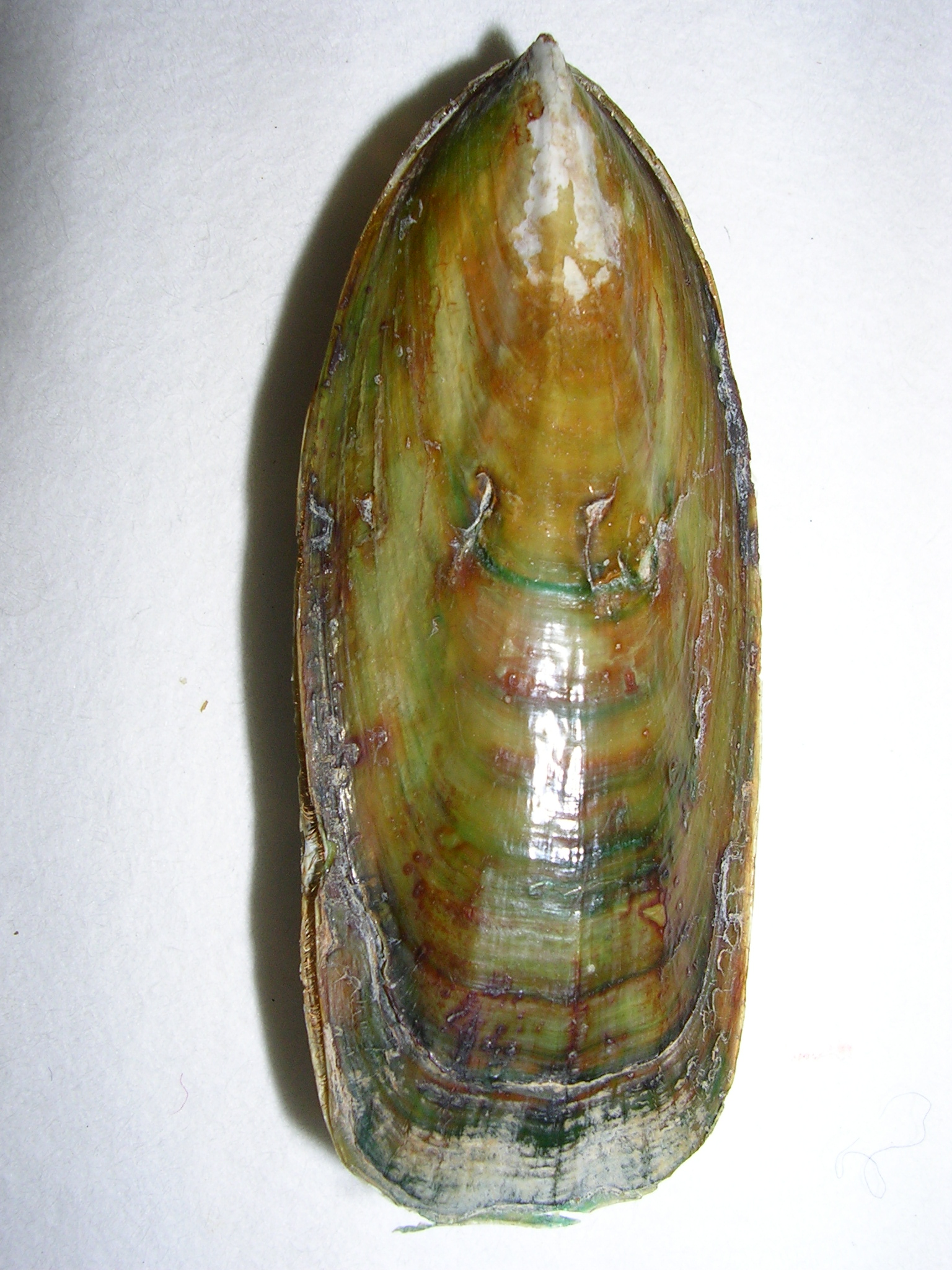
- Shell of the Cambrian-modern brachiopod Lingula
  †Lingula
  - †Lingula carbonaria
  - †Lingula fleenori – type locality for species
  - †Lingula krugeri – type locality for species
  - †Lingula louisianensis
  - †Lingula osagensis
- †Linnarsonella
  - †Linnarsonella girtyi
- †Linoproductus
  - †Linoproductus distortus
  - †Linoproductus echinatus
  - †Linoproductus planiventralis
  - †Linoproductus prattenianus
- †Linopteris
  - †Linopteris gilkersonensis
- †Liospira
  - †Liospira micula
  - †Liospira obtusa
  - †Liospira progne
- †Liroceras
  - †Liroceras liratum
- †Lissatrypa
  - †Lissatrypa henryhousensis
- †Listrochiton
  - †Listrochiton productus
- †Litocrinus
- †Lonchodina
- †Lonchodus
  - †Lonchodus simplex – tentative report
- †Lophamplexus
  - †Lophamplexus ulius
  - †Lophamplexus westii – type locality for species
- †Lophonema – type locality for genus
  - †Lophonema circumlirata – or unidentified comparable form
  - †Lophonema peccatonica
  - †Lophonema taneyensis – type locality for species
- †Lophophyllidium – type locality for genus
  - †Lophophyllidium distortum – type locality for species
  - †Lophophyllidium hadrum – type locality for species
- †Lophospira
  - †Lophospira obliqua
  - †Lophospira perangulata
- †Lophotriletes
  - †Lophotriletes commissuralis
  - †Lophotriletes microsaetosus
- †Lorangerella
  - †Lorangerella parva
- †Lycopodites
- †Lycospora
  - †Lycospora granulata
  - †Lycospora micropapillata
  - †Lycospora pusilla
- †Lyriopecten
  - †Lyriopecten tricostatus

== M ==
- †Macluritella
  - †Macluritella stantoni
- †Macrocrinus
  - †Macrocrinus mundulus
- †Macroscenella – tentative report
  - †Macroscenella type locality for species – informal
- †Magnumbonella – type locality for genus
  - †Magnumbonella macrura – type locality for species
- †Manespira
  - †Manespira nicolleti
- †Marginatia
  - †Marginatia fernglenensis
  - †Marginatia magna – type locality for species
- †Mariopteris
  - †Mariopteris dicipiens
  - †Mariopteris mazoniana
  - †Mariopteris sphenopteroides
  - †Mariopteris spiniosa
- †Matherella
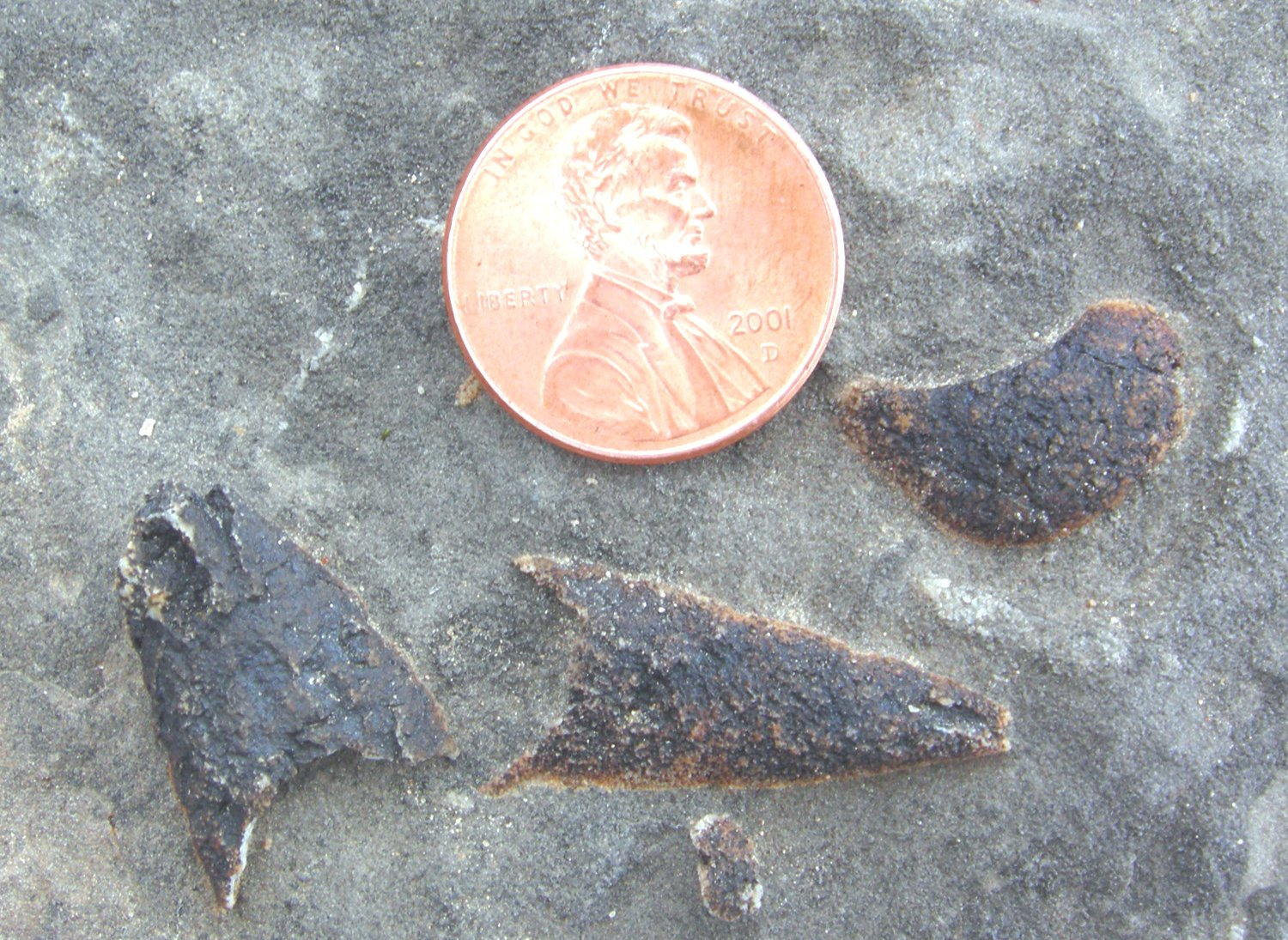
- Fossilized plates of the Cambrian-Early Ordovician chiton Matthevia
  †Matthevia
  - †Matthevia erecta – type locality for species
  - †Matthevia walcotti – or unidentified comparable form
- †Maximites
  - †Maximites cherokeensis – type locality for species
- †Meekospira
  - †Meekospira peracuta
- †Megaglossoceras
  - †Megaglossoceras pristinum
- †Mendacella – tentative report
- †Merista
- †Meristella
  - †Meristella parva
- †Meristina
  - †Meristina ovoides
- †Merocanites
  - †Merocanites drostei – or unidentified comparable form
- †Mesoblastus – tentative report
- †Mesolobus
  - †Mesolobus striatus
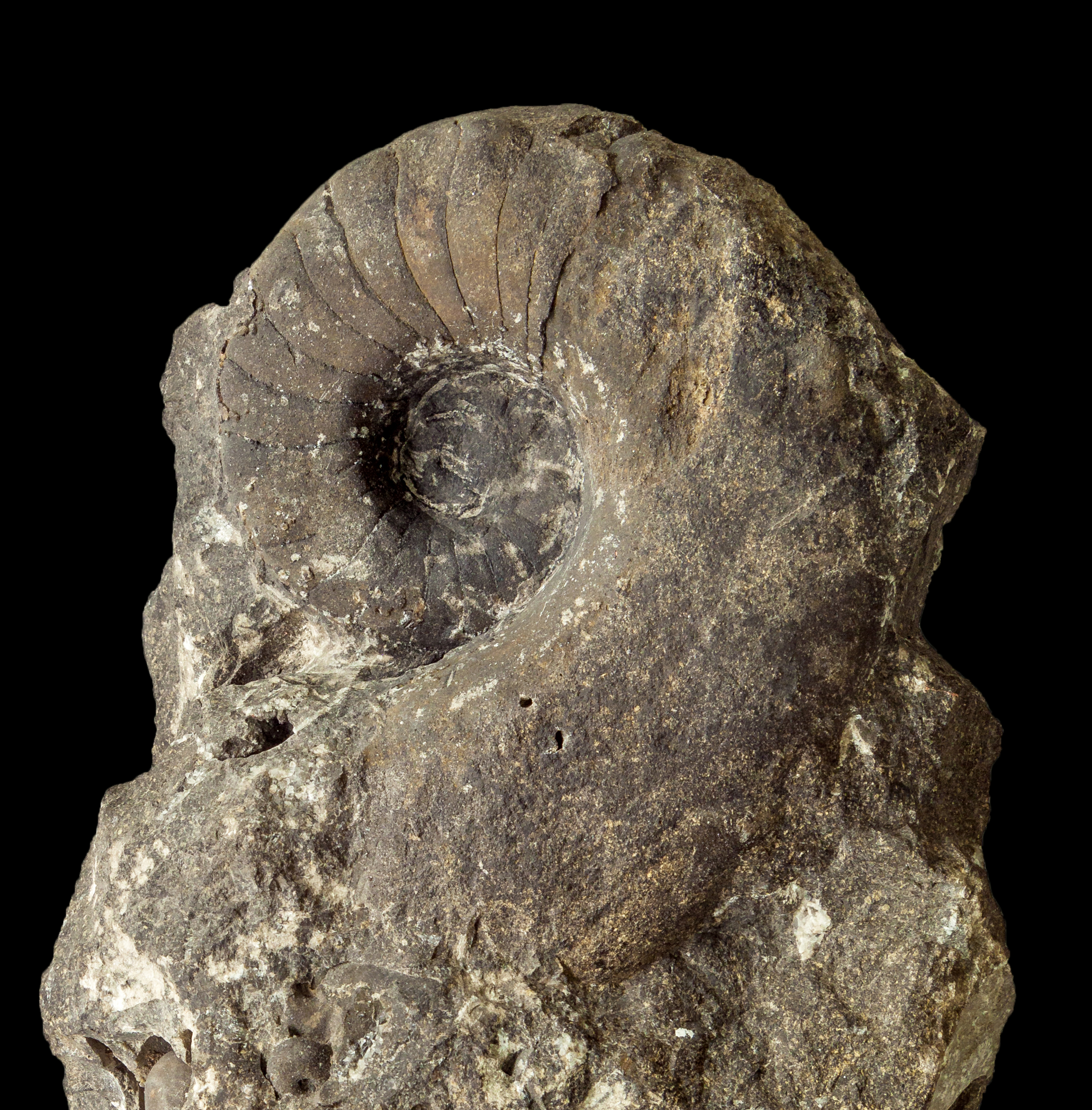
- Fossilized shell of the Carboniferous-Permian nautiloid cephalopod Metacoceras
  †Metacoceras
- †Microantyx
  - †Microantyx botoni
- †Microcyathus
  - †Microcyathus enormis
- †Microdoma
  - †Microdoma conicum
- †Microreticulatisporites
  - †Microreticulatisporites nobilis
  - †Microreticulatisporites sulcatus
- †Mimospira – tentative report
  - †Mimospira type locality for species – informal
- †Modiolodon
  - †Modiolodon subrhomboideus – type locality for species
- †Modiolopsis
  - †Modiolopsis convexa – type locality for species
  - †Modiolopsis expansa – type locality for species
- †Monilopora
- †Monogonoceras
  - †Monogonoceras subrectum
- †Mooreisporites
  - †Mooreisporites inusitatus
- †Mooreocrinus
- †Moreyella – type locality for genus
  - †Moreyella aviculiformis – type locality for species
  - †Moreyella trilobata – type locality for species
  - †Moreyella typicalis – type locality for species
- †Mourlonia
  - †Mourlonia missouriensis – type locality for species
- †Muensteroceras
  - †Muensteroceras pfefferae
- †Murchisonia – tentative report
  - †Murchisonia pygmaea
- †Myalina
  - †Myalina aviculoides
  - †Myalina lepta – tentative report
- †Myelodactylus

== N ==
- †Namuropyge
  - †Namuropyge armata
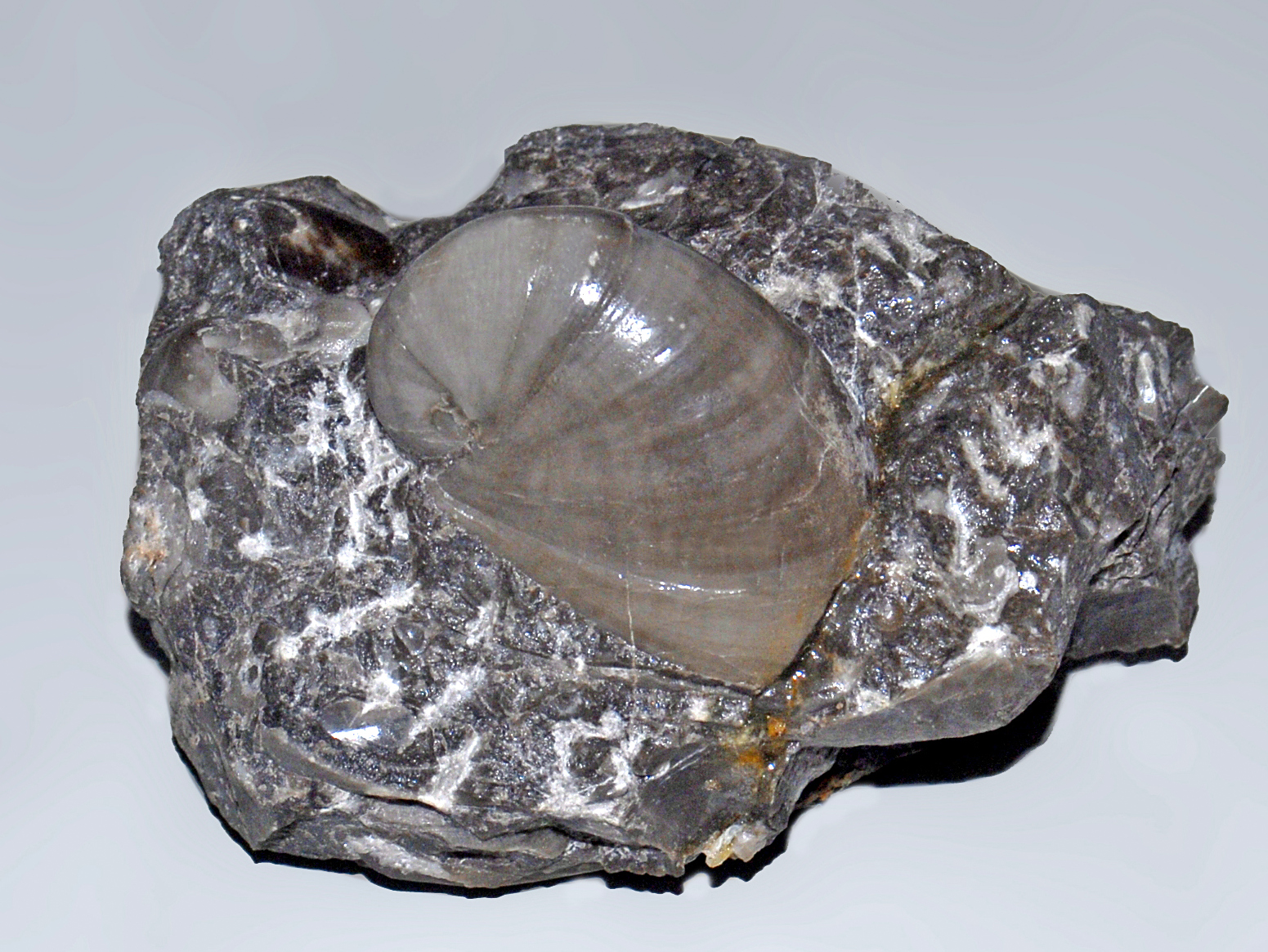
- Fossilized shell of the Early Devonian – Triassic sea snail Naticopsis
  †Naticopsis
  - †Naticopsis judithae – type locality for species
  - †Naticopsis marthaae – type locality for species
  - †Naticopsis paucivolutus – type locality for species
  - †Naticopsis scintilla – type locality for species
  - †Naticopsis virgata – type locality for species
  - †Naticopsis wortheniana – type locality for species
- †Natiria
  - †Natiria americana
- †Neochonetes
- †Neoprioniodus
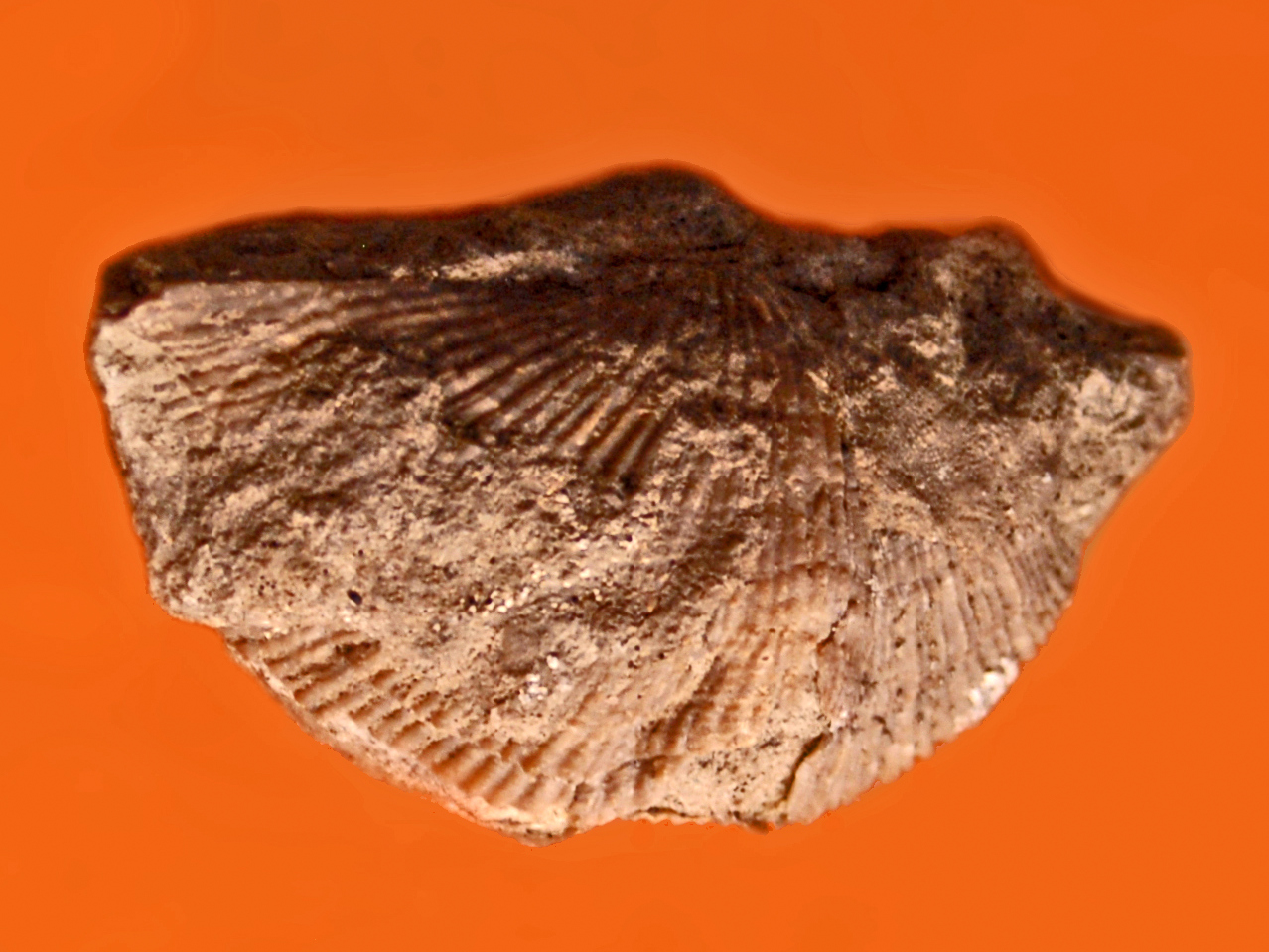
- Fossilized shell of the Carboniferous-Permian brachiopod Neospirifer
  †Neospirifer
  - †Neospirifer cameratus
  - †Neospirifer goreii
  - †Neospirifer latus
  - †Neospirifer triplicatus
- †Neozaphrentis
  - †Neozaphrentis acuta
  - †Neozaphrentis palmeri
  - †Neozaphrentis parasitica
- †Nervostrophia
  - †Nervostrophia fragilis
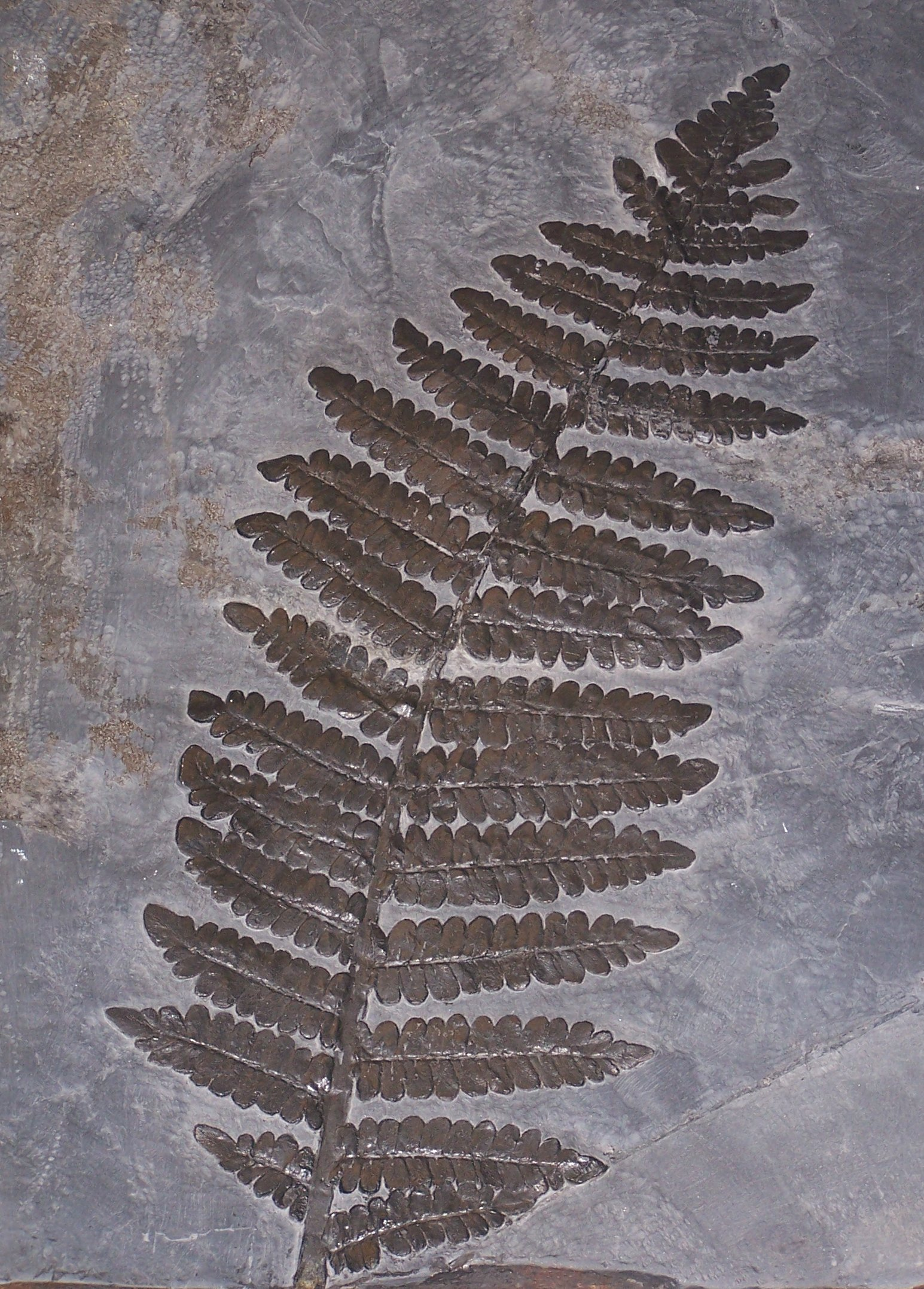
- Fossilized frond of the Carboniferous seed fern Neuropteris
  †Neuropteris
  - †Neuropteris caudata
  - †Neuropteris dilatata
  - †Neuropteris elacerata – type locality for species
  - †Neuropteris fimbrianta
  - †Neuropteris flexuosa
  - †Neuropteris heterophylla
  - †Neuropteris jenneyi
  - †Neuropteris missouriensis
  - †Neuropteris ovata
  - †Neuropteris rarinervis
  - †Neuropteris scheuchzeri
  - †Neuropteris scheuschzeri
  - †Neuropteris tenuifolia
  - †Neuropteris trichomanoides – or unidentified comparable form
- †Newberria
  - †Newberria cordiforme
  - †Newberria missouriensis
- †Nucleospira
  - †Nucleospira minima
  - †Nucleospira obesa
  - †Nucleospira raritas
  - †Nucleospira rowleyi
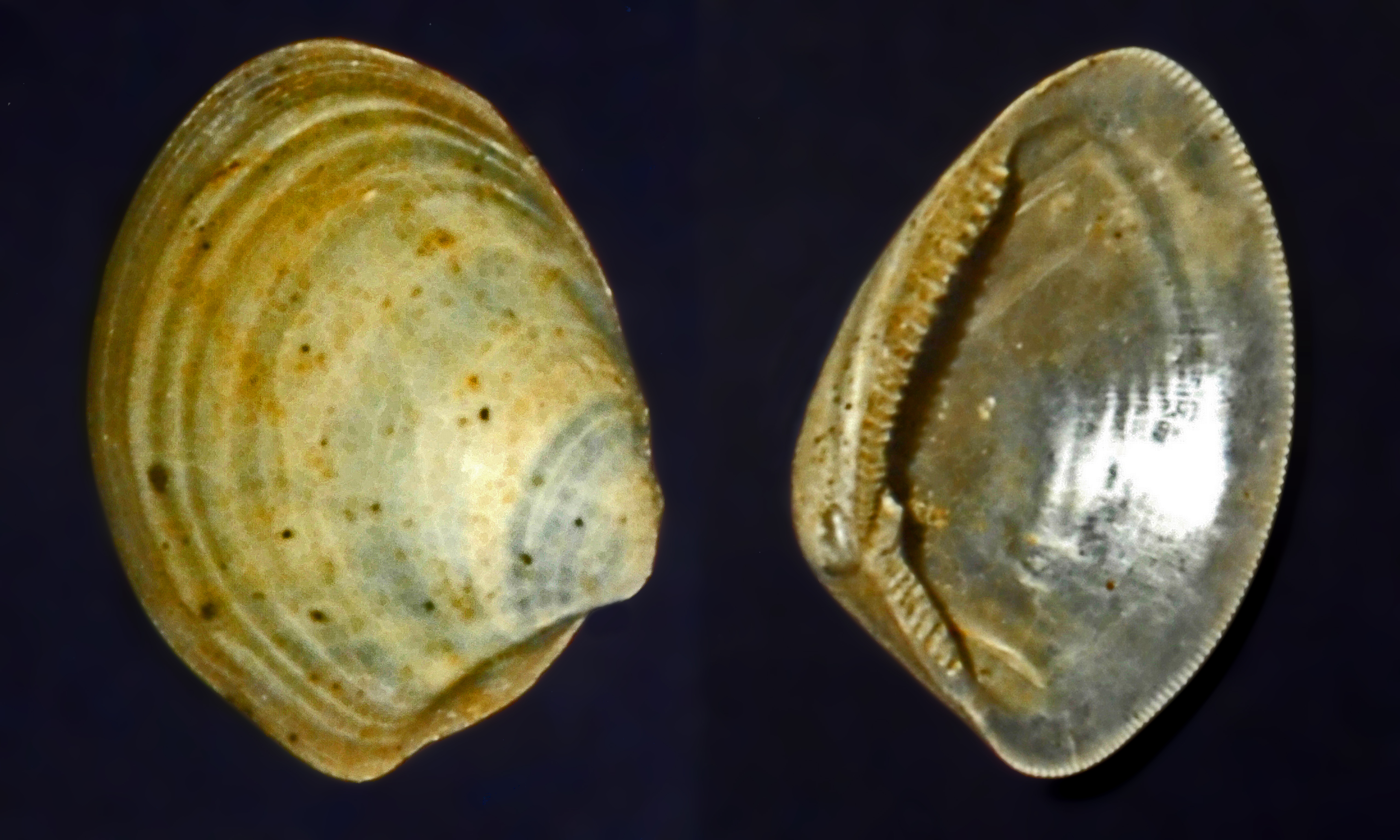
- Interior of a fossilized shell of the Early Ordovician-modern marine bivalve Nucula
  Nucula
  - †Nucula subrotunda
- Nuculana
  - †Nuculana rowleyi
- †Nuculopsis
  - †Nuculopsis girtyi

== O ==
- †Ocnerorthis
  - †Ocnerorthis monticola
- †Octocrinus – type locality for genus
  - †Octocrinus inconsuetus – type locality for species
- †Oklahomacystis
- †Oncagnostus
  - †Oncagnostus tumidosus
- †Oneotoceras
- †Ophileta
  - †Ophileta supraplana
- †Orbiculoidea
  - †Orbiculoidea capuliformis
  - †Orbiculoidea elongata – type locality for species
  - †Orbiculoidea limata
  - †Orbiculoidea missouriensis
- †Orbinaria
  - †Orbinaria pyxidata
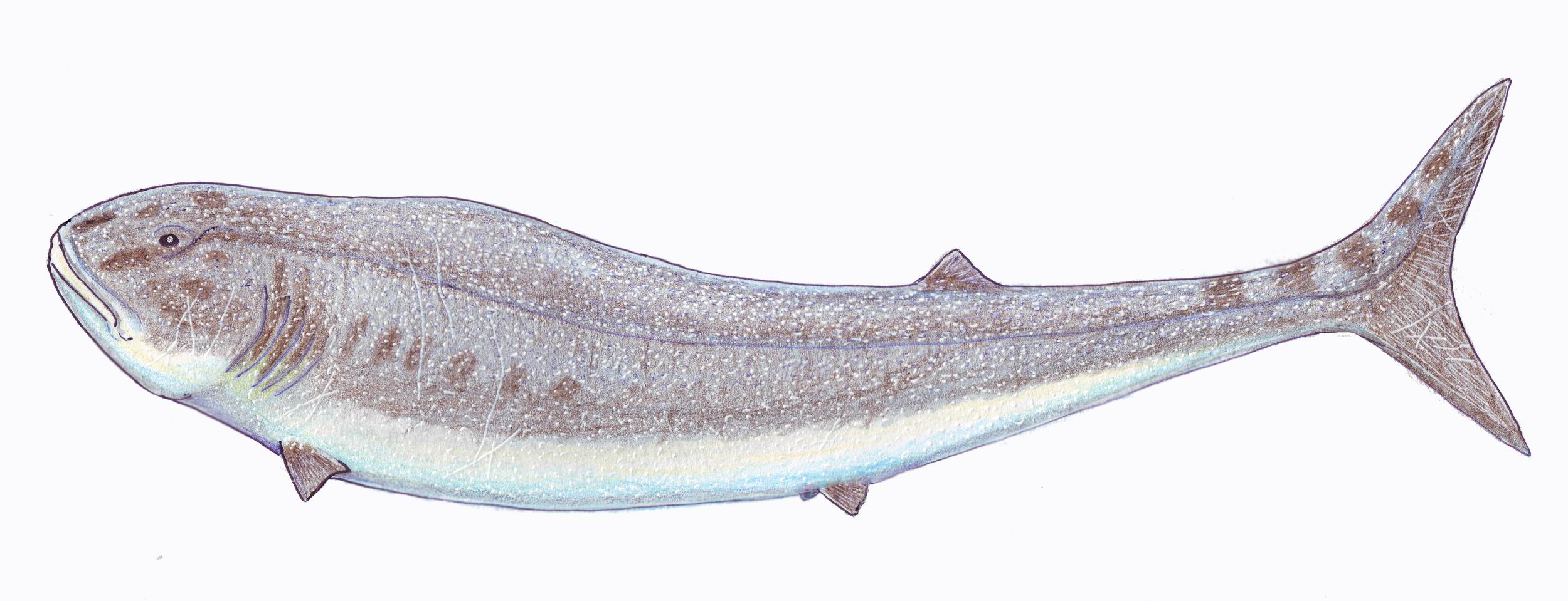
- Restoration of the Carboniferous-Permian cartilaginous fish Orodus
  †Orodus
  - †Orodus intermedius
- †Orospira
  - †Orospira bigranosa
  - †Orospira conica – type locality for species
  - †Orospira depressa
  - †Orospira elegantula – type locality for species
  - †Orospira elevata – type locality for species
  - †Orospira gainesvillensis – type locality for species
- †Orthoceras
  - †Orthoceras chemungense – tentative report
  - †Orthoceras minimum
- †Orthoconus – type locality for genus
  - †Orthoconus striatus – type locality for species
- †Orthomyalina
  - †Orthomyalina subquadrata
- †Orthonema
  - †Orthonema inornatum – type locality for species
  - †Orthonema marvinwelleri – type locality for species
  - †Orthonema salteri – type locality for species
- †Orthonychia
  - †Orthonychia jeffersonensis – type locality for species
  - †Orthonychia parva
  - †Orthonychia ungula – type locality for species
- †Orthospirifer
  - †Orthospirifer euruteines
  - †Orthospirifer iowensis
- †Orthostrophella
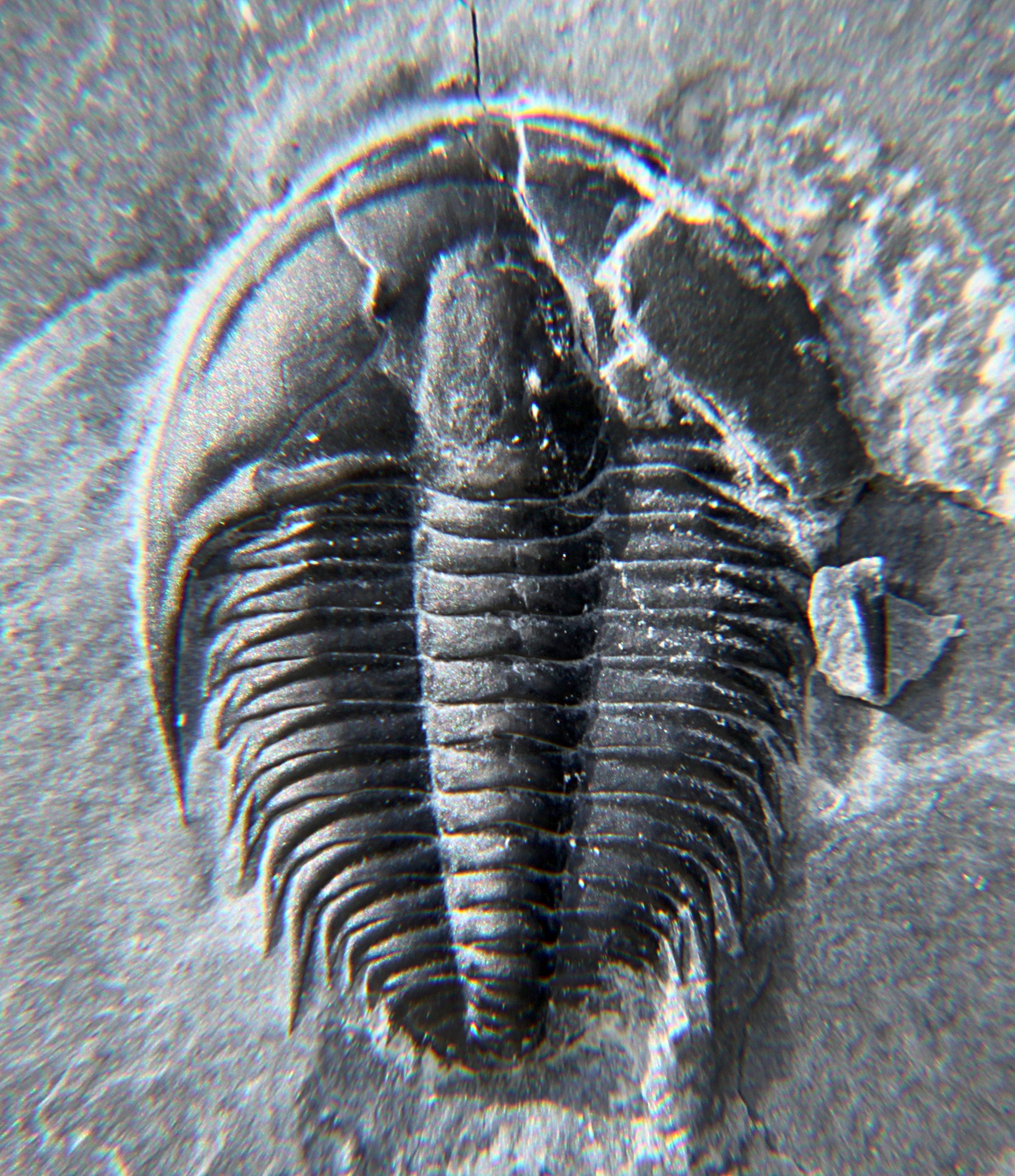
- Fossil of the Cambrian trilobite Orygmaspis
  †Orygmaspis
- †Oulodus
- †Ovatia
  - †Ovatia laevicostatus – or unidentified comparable form
- †Owenoceras
  - †Owenoceras bellilineatum
- †Oxynoblatta
  - †Oxynoblatta americana – type locality for species
- †Oxyprora
  - †Oxyprora missouriensis – type locality for species
  - †Oxyprora parrishi – type locality for species
- †Ozarkoconus – type locality for genus
  - †Ozarkoconus prearcuatus – type locality for species
- †Ozarkodina
- †Ozarkplina – type locality for genus
  - †Ozarkplina meramecensis – type locality for species

== P ==
- †Paffrathopsis
  - †Paffrathopsis nana
- †Palaeolima
  - †Palaeolima retifera
- †Palaeoneilo
  - †Palaeoneilo angusta
  - †Palaeoneilo constricta
  - †Palaeoneilo ignota
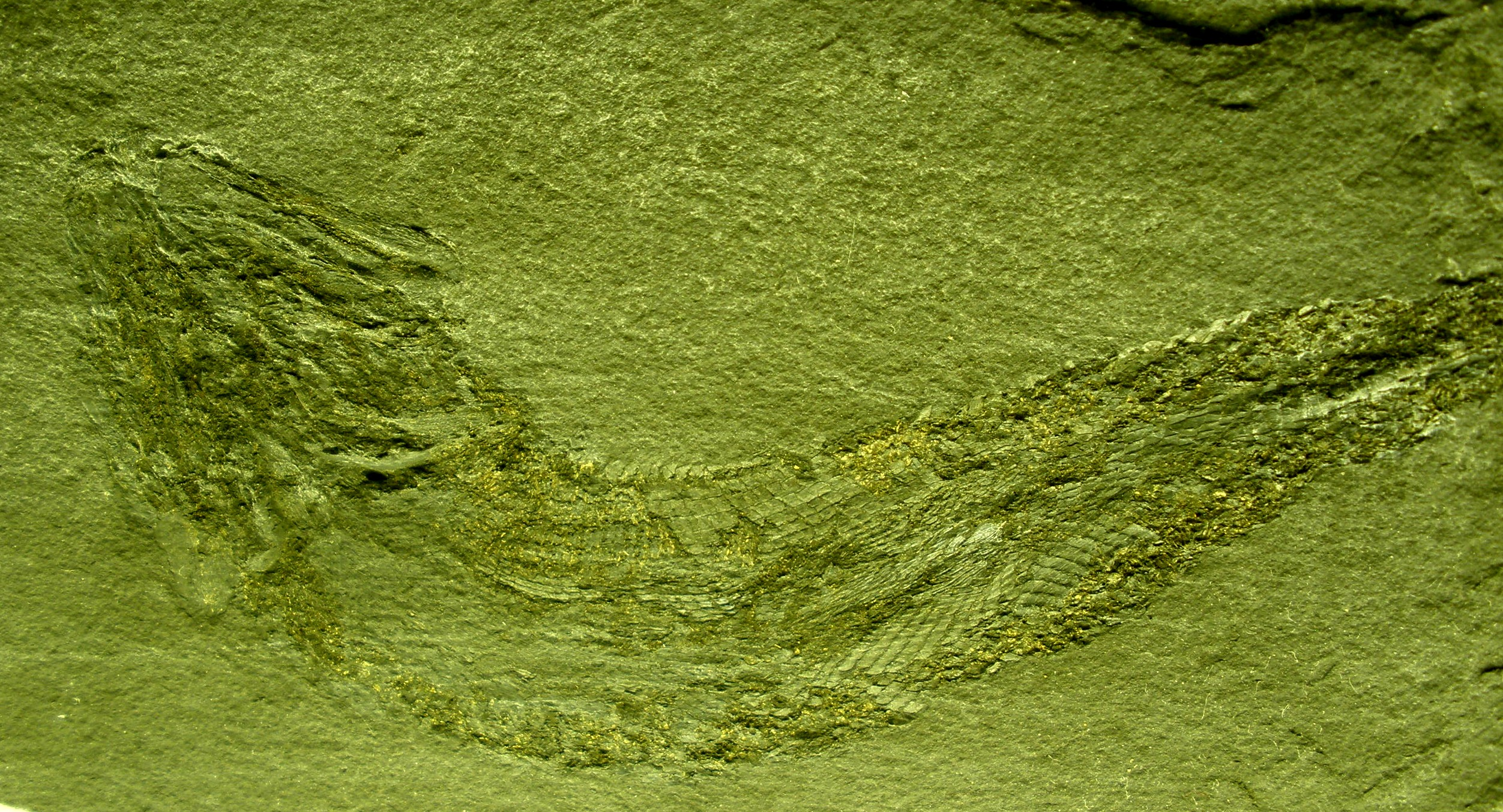
- Fossilized skeleton of the Permian bony fish Palaeoniscum
  †Palaeoniscus
- †Palaeospiroplectammina
  - †Palaeospiroplectammina parva – or unidentified related form
- †Palaeostylus
  - †Palaeostylus cylindrata – type locality for species
  - †Palaeostylus marvinwelleri – type locality for species
  - †Palaeostylus minuta – type locality for species
- †Palaeozygopleura
  - †Palaeozygopleura missouriensis – type locality for species
- †Palawospiroplectammina
  - †Palawospiroplectammina parva – or unidentified related form
- †Paleocrinus
  - †Paleocrinus platybasalis
- †Panderodus
  - †Panderodus gracilis
- †Parabolinoides
  - †Parabolinoides hebe
- †Paracyclas
  - †Paracyclas elliptica
  - †Paracyclas lirata
  - †Paracyclas rowleyi
- †Paradiabolocrinus
- †Paradichocrinus
  - †Paradichocrinus planus
- †Paradycheia – type locality for genus
  - †Paradycheia dorisae – type locality for species
- †Parahousia
  - †Parahousia constricta
- †Parajuresania
  - †Parajuresania nebrascensis
- †Parallelodon
  - †Parallelodon louisianensis
  - †Parallelodon obsoletus
  - †Parallelodon sulcatus
- †Parallelodus – type locality for genus
  - †Parallelodus obliquus – type locality for species
- †Parametacoceras
  - †Parametacoceras bellatulum
- †Paraphorhynchus
  - †Paraphorhynchus striatocostatum
- †Paraplethopeltis
  - †Paraplethopeltis minuta – type locality for species
- †Passalocrinus – type locality for genus
  - †Passalocrinus triangularis – type locality for species
- †Patellilabia
  - †Patellilabia tentoriolum – tentative report
- †Paupospira
  - †Paupospira oweni
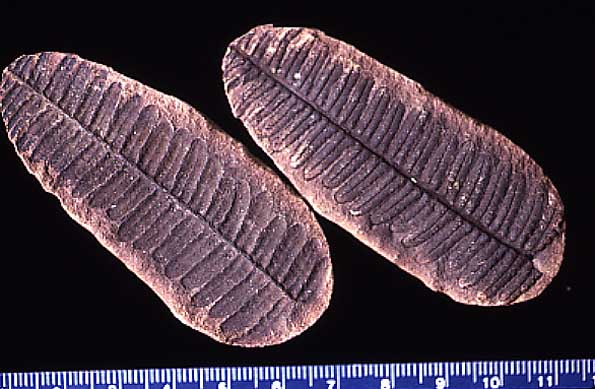
- Fossils of the Late Devonian-Permian fern-like fronds Pecopteris
  †Pecopteris
  - †Pecopteris clintoni
  - †Pecopteris dentata
  - †Pecopteris lesquereuxii
  - †Pecopteris pseudovestita
  - †Pecopteris unita
- †Pelicephalus
  - †Pelicephalus lochmani – type locality for species
- †Pentamerella
  - †Pentamerella fultonensis
  - †Pentamerella laeviscula
  - †Pentamerella magna
  - †Pentamerella multicostella
  - †Pentamerella rugosa
  - †Pentamerella subarata
- †Perditocardinia
  - †Perditocardinia dubia – or unidentified comparable form
- †Perexigupyge
  - †Perexigupyge chouteauensis – type locality for species
- †Permophorus
  - †Permophorus tropidophorus
- †Pernopecten
  - †Pernopecten attenuatus
  - †Pernopecten ohioensis
- †Peruniscus
  - †Peruniscus macer
- †Petrocrania
  - †Petrocrania familica
  - †Petrocrania modesta
- †Petrodus
- †Pharkidonotus
  - †Pharkidonotus percarinatus
- †Phestia
  - †Phestia diversoides
  - †Phestia spatulata
- †Philhedra
- †Phillipsia – tentative report
- †Pholidostrophia
  - †Pholidostrophia iowensis
- †Phragmolites
  - †Phragmolites fimbriata
  - †Phragmolites multinotatus
- †Phricodothyris
- †Phthanocoris – type locality for genus
  - †Phthanocoris occidentalis – type locality for species
- †Phymatopleura
  - †Phymatopleura nodosa
- †Pilosisporites
  - †Pilosisporites aculeolatus
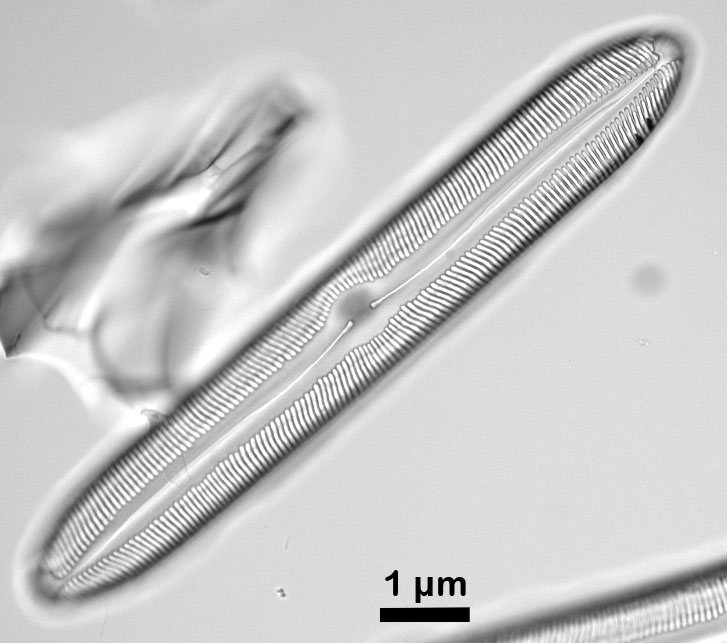
- Light micrograph of a Pinnularia alga
  †Pinnularia
- †Pionodema
  - †Pionodema subaequata
- †Pisocrinus
  - †Pisocrinus glabellus
  - †Pisocrinus gorbyi
  - †Pisocrinus quinquelobus
  - †Pisocrinus spatulatus
  - †Pisocrinus tentative reportsp. nov. 1 – informal
  - †Pisocrinus tentative reportsp. nov. 2 – informal
- †Plagioglypta
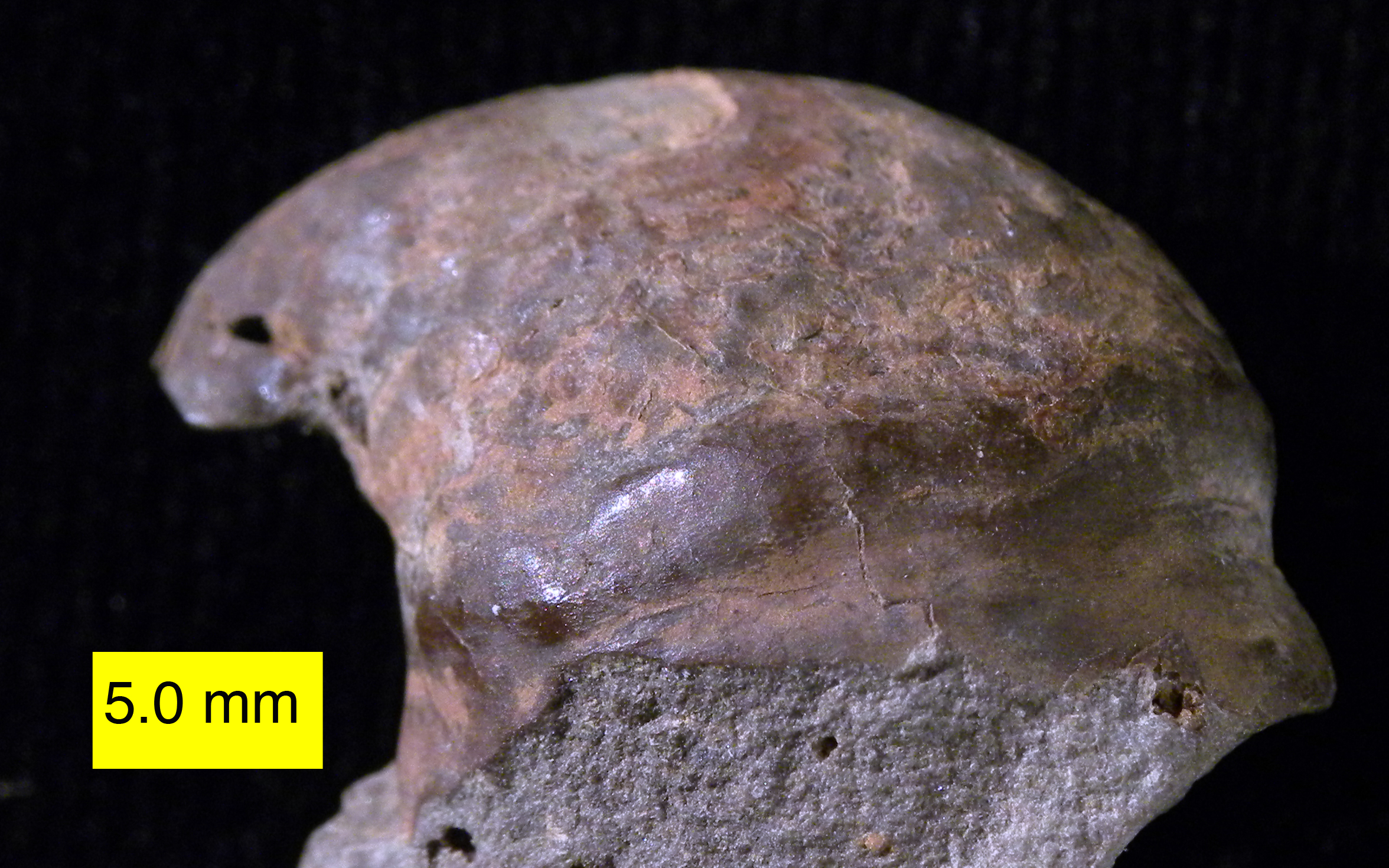
- Fossilized shell of the Silurian-Early Triassic sea snail Platyceras
  †Platyceras
  - †Platyceras encloides – type locality for species
  - †Platyceras evolutus – type locality for species
  - †Platyceras glenparkensis – type locality for species
  - †Platyceras paralium
  - †Platyceras pulcherrimum
- †Platyconcha
  - †Platyconcha crenimarginis – type locality for species
- †Platycrinus
  - †Platycrinus dodgei
- †Platyfundocrinus
  - †Platyfundocrinus typus
- †Plectambonites
  - †Plectambonites sericeus
- †Plectodina
  - †Plectodina edentula
- †Plectospira
  - †Plectospira raricosta
- †Plethopeltis
- †Plethospira
  - †Plethospira arenaria – or unidentified comparable form
  - †Plethospira cannonensis – or unidentified related form
  - †Plethospira cassina – or unidentified related form
  - †Plethospira extensa – type locality for species
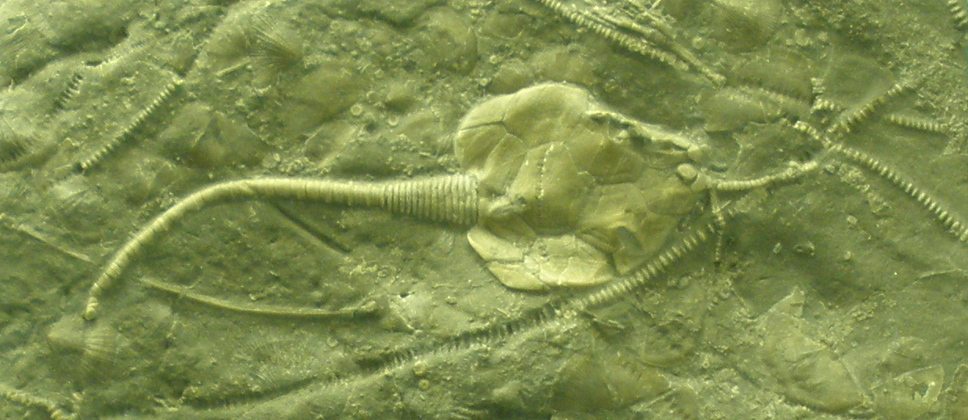
- Fossil of the Late Ordovician cystoid echinoderm Pleurocystites
  †Pleurocystites
  - †Pleurocystites filitextus
- †Pleurophorus
  - †Pleurophorus occidentalis
- †Plicochonetes
  - †Plicochonetes glenparkensis – tentative report
- †Plocezyga
  - †Plocezyga abolescens
  - †Plocezyga angularis – type locality for species
  - †Plocezyga convertacostata – type locality for species
  - †Plocezyga corona – type locality for species
  - †Plocezyga percostata – type locality for species
  - †Plocezyga tenuilirata – type locality for species
  - †Plocezyga tenuis – type locality for species
- †Plumalina
  - †Plumalina gracilis
- †Pojetaconcha
  - †Pojetaconcha limatula – type locality for species
- †Polidevcia
  - †Polidevcia bellistriata
- †Polygnathus
  - †Polygnathus communis
- †Polyplacognathus
  - †Polyplacognathus ramosus
- †Polypora
- †Polytoechia
- †Polytryphocycloides
- †Ponumia – tentative report
- †Porocrinus
  - †Porocrinus petersenae
- †Poteriocrinus
  - †Poteriocrinus jeffriesi
- †Potonieisporites
- †Potosiplina – type locality for genus
  - †Potosiplina delorensis – type locality for species
- †Praepatokephalus
- †Praepleurocystites
  - †Praepleurocystites watkinsi – tentative report
- †Primitia
  - †Primitia type locality for species 1 – informal
  - †Primitia type locality for species 2 – informal
- †Prioniodus
  - †Prioniodus cacti – type locality for species
  - †Prioniodus dactylodus – type locality for species
  - †Prioniodus galesburgensis – type locality for species
- †Prismostylus
  - †Prismostylus fibratum
- †Productella
  - †Productella callawayensis
  - †Productella subalata
- †Productina
  - †Productina sampsoni
- †Proetides
  - †Proetides colemani
  - †Proetides strattonporteri
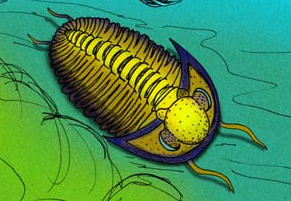
- Restoration of the Silurian trilobite Proetus
  †Proetus
  - †Proetus canalis
  - †Proetus missouriensis
  - †Proetus tenuituberculus
- †Prokopicrinidae
- †Prolecanites – tentative report
- †Promytilus
  - †Promytilus annosus
- †Proplina
  - †Proplina arcua – type locality for species
  - †Proplina cornutaformis
  - †Proplina elongata – type locality for species
  - †Proplina grandis – tentative report
  - †Proplina inflatus – type locality for species
  - †Proplina meramecensis – type locality for species
  - †Proplina sibelius – type locality for species
  - †Proplina suttoni – type locality for species
- †Proteroconus – type locality for genus
  - †Proteroconus eminense – type locality for species
- †Protocanites
  - †Protocanites louisianensis
- †Protocycloceras
  - †Protocycloceras doniphorense
- †Pseudagnostus
  - †Pseudagnostus communis
- †Pseudoatrypa
  - †Pseudoatrypa missouriensis
- †Pseudobigalea – type locality for genus
  - †Pseudobigalea crista – type locality for species
- †Pseudomonotis
  - †Pseudomonotis equistriata
- †Pseudopolygnathus
  - †Pseudopolygnathus multistriatus
- †Pseudorthoceras
  - †Pseudorthoceras knoxense
- †Pseudosaratogia
  - †Pseudosaratogia lata
- †Pseudosyrinx
  - †Pseudosyrinx missouriensis
- †Pseudozygopleura – type locality for genus
  - †Pseudozygopleura acuminata – type locality for species
  - †Pseudozygopleura assertonsoris – type locality for species
  - †Pseudozygopleura condrai – type locality for species
  - †Pseudozygopleura conica – type locality for species
  - †Pseudozygopleura deloi – type locality for species
  - †Pseudozygopleura eucharis – type locality for species
  - †Pseudozygopleura funis – type locality for species
  - †Pseudozygopleura leveneae – type locality for species
  - †Pseudozygopleura macra – type locality for species
  - †Pseudozygopleura moorei – type locality for species
  - †Pseudozygopleura nana – type locality for species
  - †Pseudozygopleura nigra – type locality for species
  - †Pseudozygopleura obtusicacuminis – type locality for species
  - †Pseudozygopleura pagoda – type locality for species
  - †Pseudozygopleura perversa – type locality for species
  - †Pseudozygopleura plummeri – type locality for species
  - †Pseudozygopleura pluricostata – type locality for species
  - †Pseudozygopleura praeacuta – type locality for species
  - †Pseudozygopleura pulchra – type locality for species
  - †Pseudozygopleura pupa – type locality for species
  - †Pseudozygopleura recticostata – type locality for species
  - †Pseudozygopleura restis – type locality for species
  - †Pseudozygopleura rothi – type locality for species
  - †Pseudozygopleura schucherti – type locality for species
  - †Pseudozygopleura scitula
  - †Pseudozygopleura semicostata
  - †Pseudozygopleura sinuosior – type locality for species
  - †Pseudozygopleura tenuivirga – type locality for species
  - †Pseudozygopleura terebra – type locality for species
  - †Pseudozygopleura teres – type locality for species
  - †Pseudozygopleura werneri – type locality for species
- †Psilocamara
  - †Psilocamara renfroarum
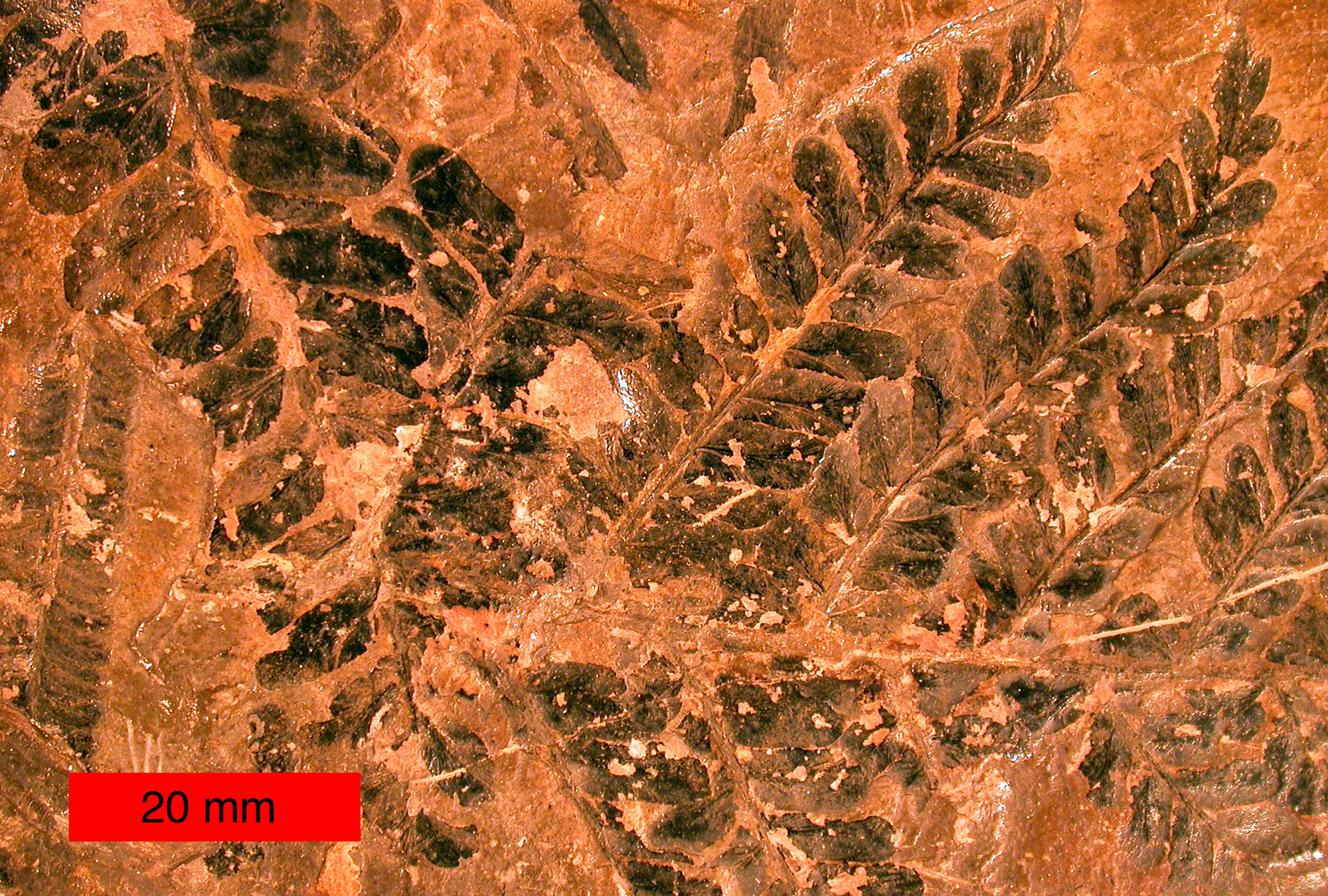
- Fossil seed fern leaves from the LateCarboniferous of northeastern Ohio.
  †Pteridosperm
- †Pterocephalia
  - †Pterocephalia sanctisabae
  - †Pterocephalia sanetisabae
- †Pterotheca
  - †Pterotheca expansa
  - †Pterotheca triangularis
- †Ptychopleurella
  - †Ptychopleurella rugiplicata
- †Ptychopyge
- †Ptychtodus
  - †Ptychtodus calceolus
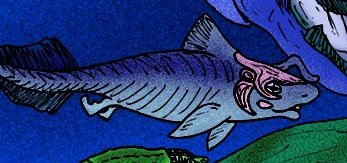
- Life restoration of the Late Devonian placoderm fish Ptyctodus
  †Ptyctodus
  - †Ptyctodus calceolus
- †Ptylopora
- †Pugnoides – report made of unidentified related form or using admittedly obsolete nomenclature
  - †Pugnoides boonensis
- †Pulchricapitus
  - †Pulchricapitus davis – type locality for species
- †Punctatisporites
  - †Punctatisporites edgarensis – or unidentified comparable form
  - †Punctatisporites flavus
  - †Punctatisporites glaber
  - †Punctatisporites minutus
  - †Punctatisporites obesus
- †Punctatosporites
  - †Punctatosporites minutus
- †Punctospirifer
  - †Punctospirifer acutus – type locality for species
  - †Punctospirifer kentuckensis
  - †Punctospirifer schucherti
- †Puntatosporites
  - †Puntatosporites minutus
- †Pustula
  - †Pustula arctifossa
- †Pycnoceras
  - †Pycnoceras clausum
  - †Pycnoceras rotundatum
- †Pyrgozyga
  - †Pyrgozyga warthini – type locality for species

== Q ==
- †Quadratia

== R ==
- †Rafinesquina
  - †Rafinesquina jeffersonensis
  - †Rafinesquina latisculptilis
  - †Rafinesquina stropheodontoides
- †Raistrickia
  - †Raistrickia abdita
  - †Raistrickia aculeata
  - †Raistrickia breveminens
  - †Raistrickia carbondalensis
  - †Raistrickia crinita
  - †Raistrickia crocea
  - †Raistrickia subcrinita
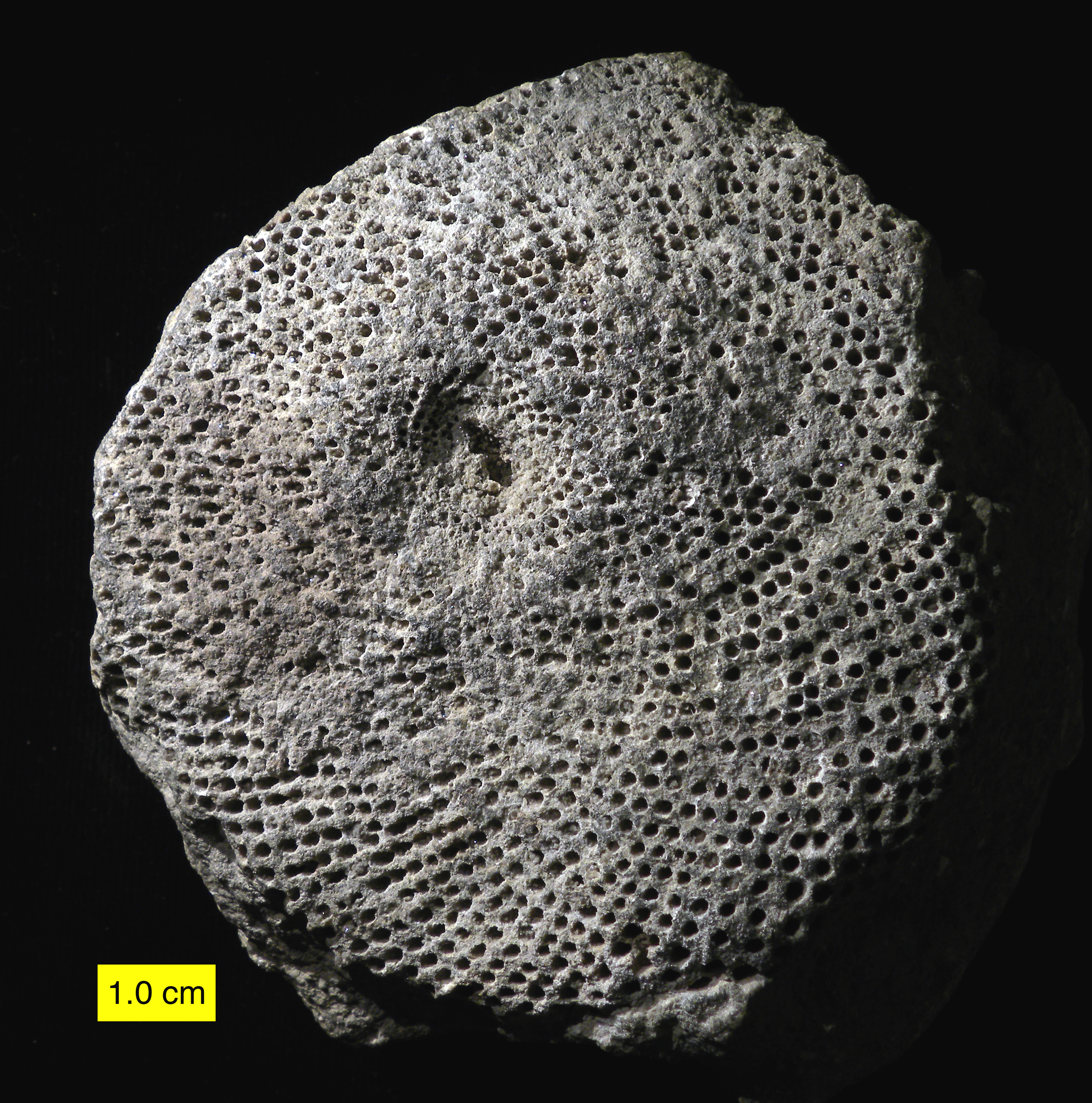
- Fossil of the Early Ordovician-Permian benthic alga Receptaculites
  †Receptaculites
  - †Receptaculites cornutiformis
- †Remopleurides
  - †Remopleurides missouriensis
- †Resserella
  - †Resserella brownsportensis
- †Reticularia
  - †Reticularia cooperensis – or unidentified related form
- †Reticulatia
  - †Reticulatia huecoensis
  - †Reticulatia tiawahensis
- †Reticulatisporites
  - †Reticulatisporites muricatus
  - †Reticulatisporites reticulatus
- †Retispira
  - †Retispira nodulifera – type locality for species
  - †Retispira tenuilineata
  - †Retispira textiliformis – type locality for species
- †Rhabdotocochlis – type locality for genus
  - †Rhabdotocochlis rugata – type locality for species
- †Rhacopea
- †Rhipidomella
  - †Rhipidomella carbonaria
  - †Rhipidomella cuneata
  - †Rhipidomella diminutiva
  - †Rhipidomella missouriensis
- †Rhombopora
- †Rhopalonaria – tentative report
- †Rhynchopora
  - †Rhynchopora hamburgensis
  - †Rhynchopora persinuata – or unidentified related form
  - †Rhynchopora rowleyi
- †Rhynchotetra
  - †Rhynchotetra gibbosum
- †Rhytimya
- †Richterella
  - †Richterella hessleri – type locality for species
- †Robustum – type locality for genus
  - †Robustum nodum – type locality for species
  - †Robustum phallerium – type locality for species
- †Rota
  - †Rota martini
- †Rotaia
- †Rotoides
  - †Rotoides imperforata
  - †Rotoides tretomesota
- †Rowleyella
  - †Rowleyella fabulites
- †Ruedemannia
  - †Ruedemannia humilis – type locality for species
- †Rugosochonetes
  - †Rugosochonetes burlingtonensis – or unidentified related form
  - †Rugosochonetes multicosta

== S ==
- †Saratogia – tentative report
- †Scaevogyra
  - †Scaevogyra swezeyi
- †Sceptaspis
  - †Sceptaspis lincolnensis – type locality for species
- †Schellwienella
  - †Schellwienella planumbona – or unidentified comparable form
- †Schizodus
  - †Schizodus affinis
  - †Schizodus amplus
- †Schizopea – type locality for genus
  - †Schizopea abrupta – type locality for species
  - †Schizopea elevata – type locality for species
  - †Schizopea grandis
  - †Schizopea normalis – type locality for species
  - †Schizopea subrotunda
  - †Schizopea transitans – type locality for species
  - †Schizopea typica
- †Schizophoria
  - †Schizophoria laudoni
  - †Schizophoria postriatula
  - †Schizophoria striatula
- †Schuchertella
  - †Schuchertella arctostriata
  - †Schuchertella hardinensis
  - †Schuchertella iowensis
  - †Schuchertella lens
  - †Schuchertella louisianensis – type locality for species
  - †Schuchertella propinqua
- †Sciadiocrinus
  - †Sciadiocrinus plautus – type locality for species
- †Sedenticellula
  - †Sedenticellula hamburgensis
- †Selenella
  - †Selenella pediculus
- †Setigerites – tentative report
- †Shansiella
  - †Shansiella broadheadi
  - †Shansiella carbonaria
- †Shelbyoceras – type locality for genus
  - †Shelbyoceras bigpineyensis – type locality for species
  - †Shelbyoceras robustum – type locality for species
- †Shumardella
- †Shumardoceras
  - †Shumardoceras complanatum
  - †Shumardoceras fragile
  - †Shumardoceras taneyense
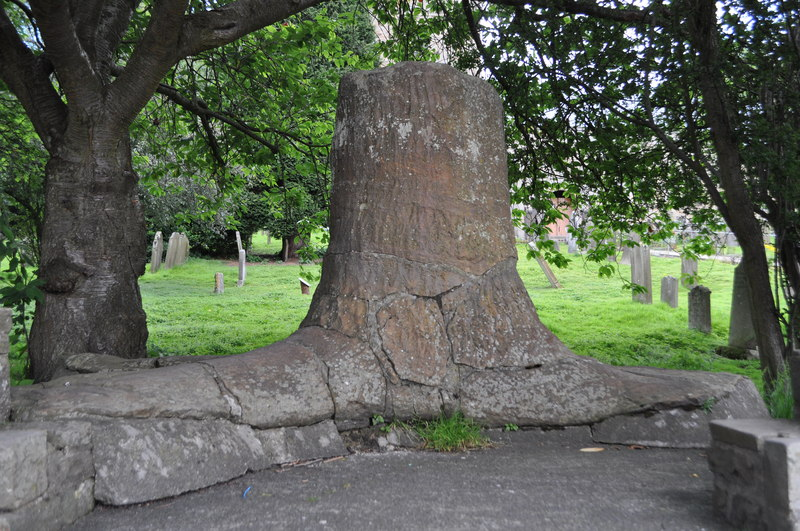
- Fossilized stump of the Carboniferous-Permian club moss relative Sigillaria
  †Sigillaria
- †Sinuopea
  - †Sinuopea basiplanata – type locality for species
  - †Sinuopea cingulata – type locality for species
  - †Sinuopea emminencis
  - †Sinuopea sweeti
  - †Sinuopea vera
- †Skenidioides
  - †Skenidioides henryhousensis – or unidentified comparable form
- Solemya
  - †Solemya radiata
  - †Solemya trapezoides
- †Soleniscus
  - †Soleniscus klipparti
  - †Soleniscus primigenius
  - †Soleniscus primogenia
  - †Soleniscus primogenius
  - †Soleniscus regularis
  - †Soleniscus typicus
- †Spathella
  - †Spathella typica
- †Spathognathodus
  - †Spathognathodus pulcher
- †Sphaerocoryphe
  - †Sphaerocoryphe arachniformis
- †Sphenolium
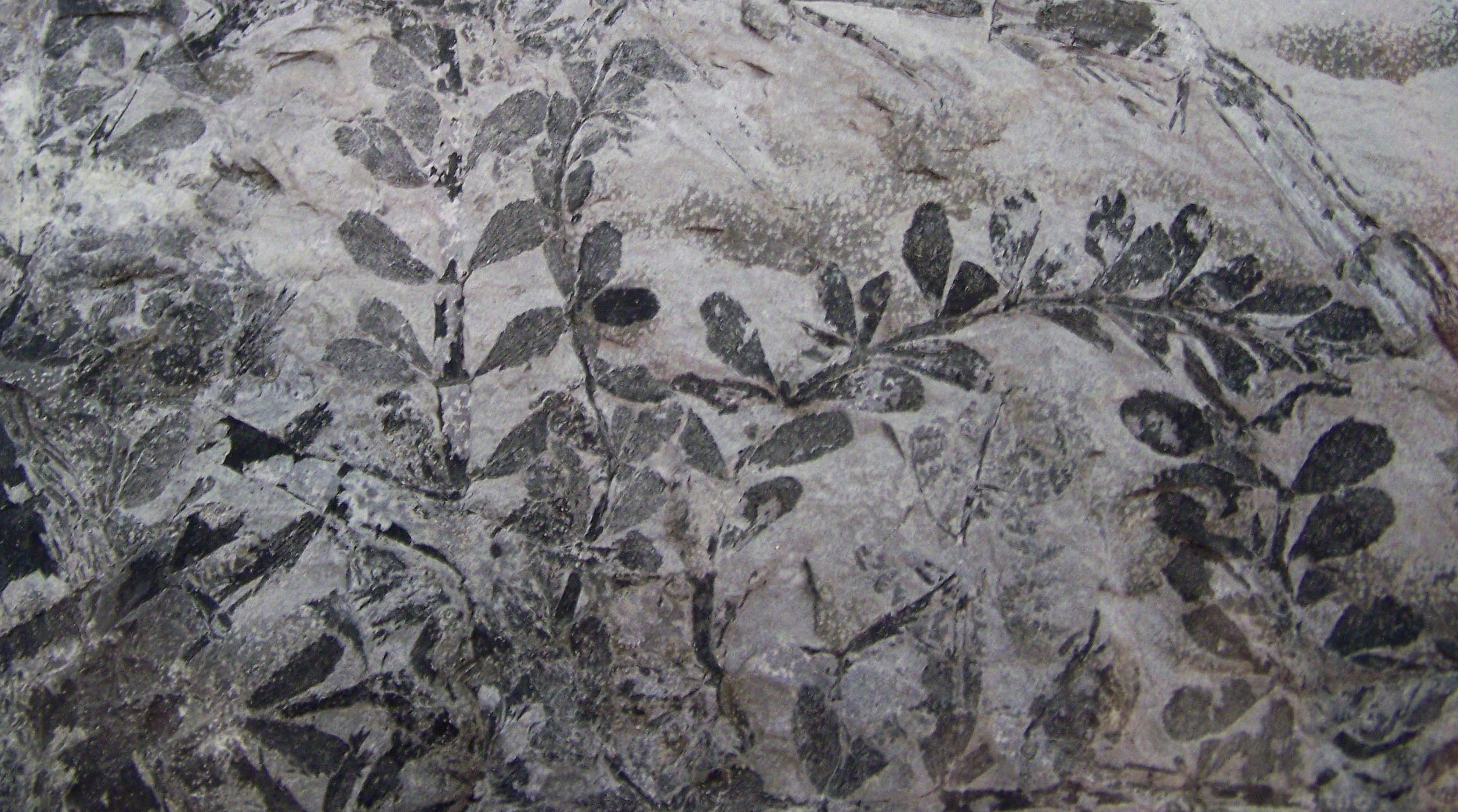
- Fossilized leaves and branches of the Devonian-Triassic horsetail relative Sphenophyllum
  †Sphenophyllum
  - †Sphenophyllum cunefolium
  - †Sphenophyllum emarginatum
  - †Sphenophyllum fasciculatum
  - †Sphenophyllum longifolium
  - †Sphenophyllum majus
- †Sphenopteris
  - †Sphenopteris lacoei
  - †Sphenopteris macilenta
  - †Sphenopteris mixta
  - †Sphenopteris obtusiloba
- †Sphenosphaera
  - †Sphenosphaera capax
- †Spinatrypa
  - †Spinatrypa bellula
  - †Spinatrypa spinosa
- †Spinocyrtia
  - †Spinocyrtia euryteines
- †Spinosporites
  - †Spinosporites exiguus
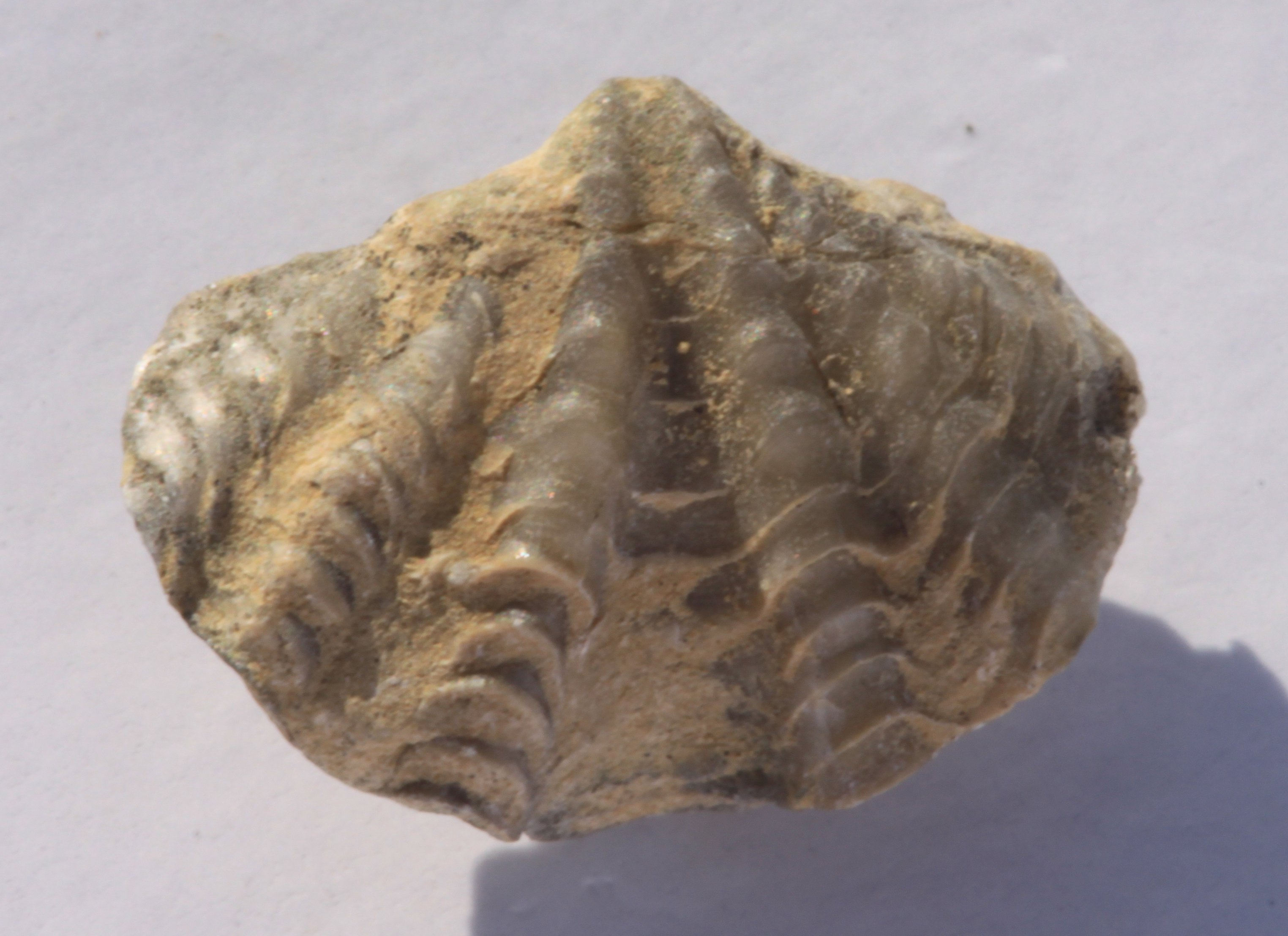
- Fossilized shell of the Late Ordovician-Late Triassic brachiopod Spirifer
  †Spirifer
  - †Spirifer forbesi
  - †Spirifer lousianensis
  - †Spirifer marionensis
  - †Spirifer opimus
  - †Spirifer rockymontanus
  - †Spirifer rowleyi
- †Spirodentalium
  - †Spirodentalium walcotti – tentative report
- Spiropteris
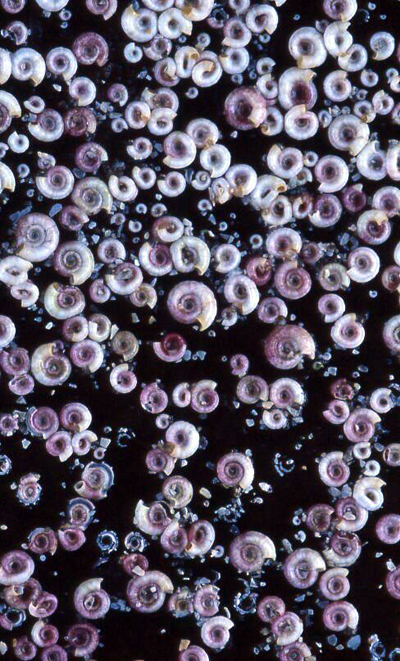
- Modern shells of the polychaete worm Spirorbis
  Spirorbis
  - †Spirorbis kinderhookensis
  - †Spirorbis kinderhookiensis
- †Spyroceras
  - †Spyroceras bilineatum
- †Stacheoides
- †Stegacanthia
  - †Stegacanthia bowsheri – or unidentified related form
- †Stegerhynchus
  - †Stegerhynchus antiqua
  - †Stegerhynchus concinna
- †Stegocoelia
  - †Stegocoelia missouriensis
- †Stenopilus
  - †Stenopilus latus
- †Stenoscisma
  - †Stenoscisma pikensis – type locality for species
- †Stephanozyga
  - †Stephanozyga nodosa – type locality for species
  - †Stephanozyga subnodosa – type locality for species
- †Straparollina
  - †Straparollina basicarinata – type locality for species
  - †Straparollina cassina – type locality for species
  - †Straparollina perangulata
  - †Straparollina turgida – tentative report
- †Streblochondria – tentative report
  - †Streblochondria infelix
  - †Streblochondria tenuilineata
- †Streblotrypa
- †Strepsodiscus
  - †Strepsodiscus major
  - †Strepsodiscus paucivoluta
- †Streptacis
  - †Streptacis meeki – type locality for species
  - †Streptacis scalpta – type locality for species
  - †Streptacis whitfieldi
- †Streptelasma
  - †Streptelasma corniculum – tentative report
  - †Streptelasma subregulare
- †Streptognathodus
  - †Streptognathodus chanutensis – type locality for species
  - †Streptognathodus clarki – type locality for species
  - †Streptognathodus clavatulus – type locality for species
  - †Streptognathodus corrugatus – type locality for species
  - †Streptognathodus curvatus – type locality for species
  - †Streptognathodus holmesi – type locality for species
  - †Streptognathodus minutus – type locality for species
  - †Streptognathodus multinodosus – type locality for species
  - †Streptognathodus rugosus – type locality for species
  - †Streptognathodus ruidus – type locality for species
  - †Streptognathodus spatulatus – type locality for species
  - †Streptognathodus strigillatus – type locality for species
  - †Streptognathodus subdivisus – type locality for species
  - †Streptognathodus sulcatus – type locality for species
  - †Streptognathodus sulciferus – type locality for species
- †Streptorhynchus
  - †Streptorhynchus tenuicostatum – or unidentified related form
- †Strobeus
  - †Strobeus brevis
  - †Strobeus intercalaris
  - †Strobeus paludinaeformis
  - †Strobeus welleri – type locality for species
- †Strophodonta
  - †Strophodonta demissa
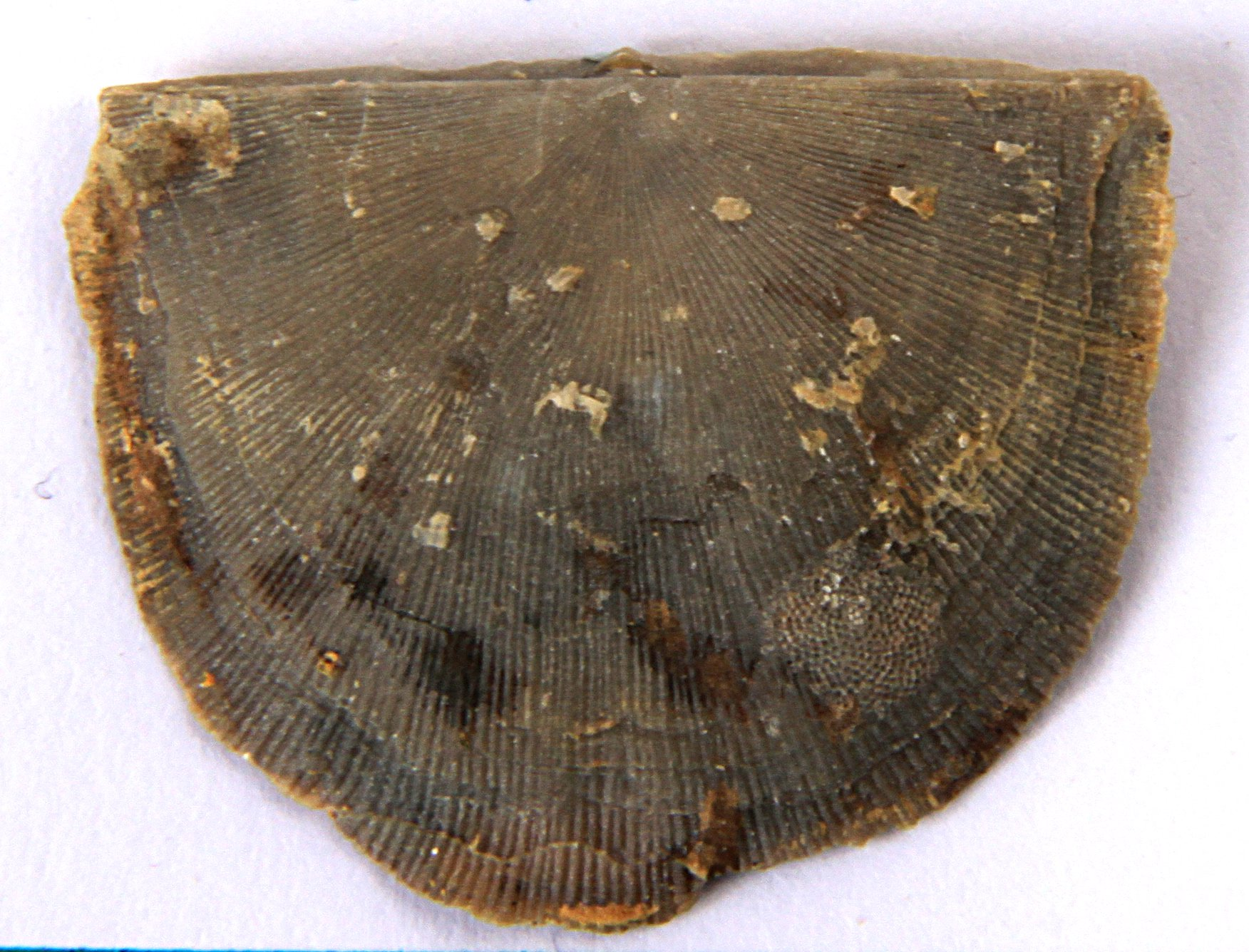
- Fossilized shell of the Ordovician-Silurian brachiopod Strophomena
  †Strophomena
  - †Strophomena boonensis
  - †Strophomena callawayensis
  - †Strophomena cayuta
  - †Strophomena cedarensis
  - †Strophomena cymbiformis
  - †Strophomena dorsata
  - †Strophomena equicostata
  - †Strophomena halli
  - †Strophomena incurvata
  - †Strophomena inflexa
  - †Strophomena interstrialis
  - †Strophomena iowensis
  - †Strophomena linderi
  - †Strophomena littletonensis
  - †Strophomena navalis
  - †Strophomena nortoni
  - †Strophomena parvis
  - †Strophomena satterfieldi – type locality for species
- †Strophonella
- †Stylocyrtoceras
  - †Stylocyrtoceras avaense
- †Subglobosochonetes
  - †Subglobosochonetes jerseyensis
- †Subprioniodus
- †Subulites
  - †Subulites conradi
- †Sulcocephalus
  - †Sulcocephalus candidus
- †Synbathocrinus
  - †Synbathocrinus melba – or unidentified comparable form
- †Synprioniodina
- †Syntrophina
  - †Syntrophina campbelli
  - †Syntrophina missouriensis
- †Syringothyris
  - †Syringothyris extenuata
  - †Syringothyris hannibalensis
  - †Syringothyris newarkensis

== T ==
- †Tabulipora
- †Taenicephalus
  - †Taenicephalus nasuta
  - †Taenicephalus shumandi
  - †Taenicephalus shumardi
- †Tarphyceras
  - †Tarphyceras chadwickense
- †Technophorus
  - †Technophorus bellistriatus – type locality for species
- †Teiichispira
  - †Teiichispira odenvillensis
  - †Teiichispira ponderosa
- †Temnocheilus
  - †Temnocheilus harneri
- †Thalamocrinus
  - †Thalamocrinus ovalis
- †Thaleops
  - †Thaleops depressicapitata
- †Thuroholia
  - †Thuroholia croneisi
  - †Thuroholia spicatus
- †Thymospora
  - †Thymospora pseudothiessenii
- †Titanoplina – type locality for genus
  - †Titanoplina meramecensis – type locality for species
- †Trachydomia
  - †Trachydomia nodosa
  - †Trachydomia oweni
- †Trematis
  - †Trematis foerstei
  - †Trematis huronensis
- †Trepospira
  - †Trepospira depressa
  - †Trepospira minima – type locality for species
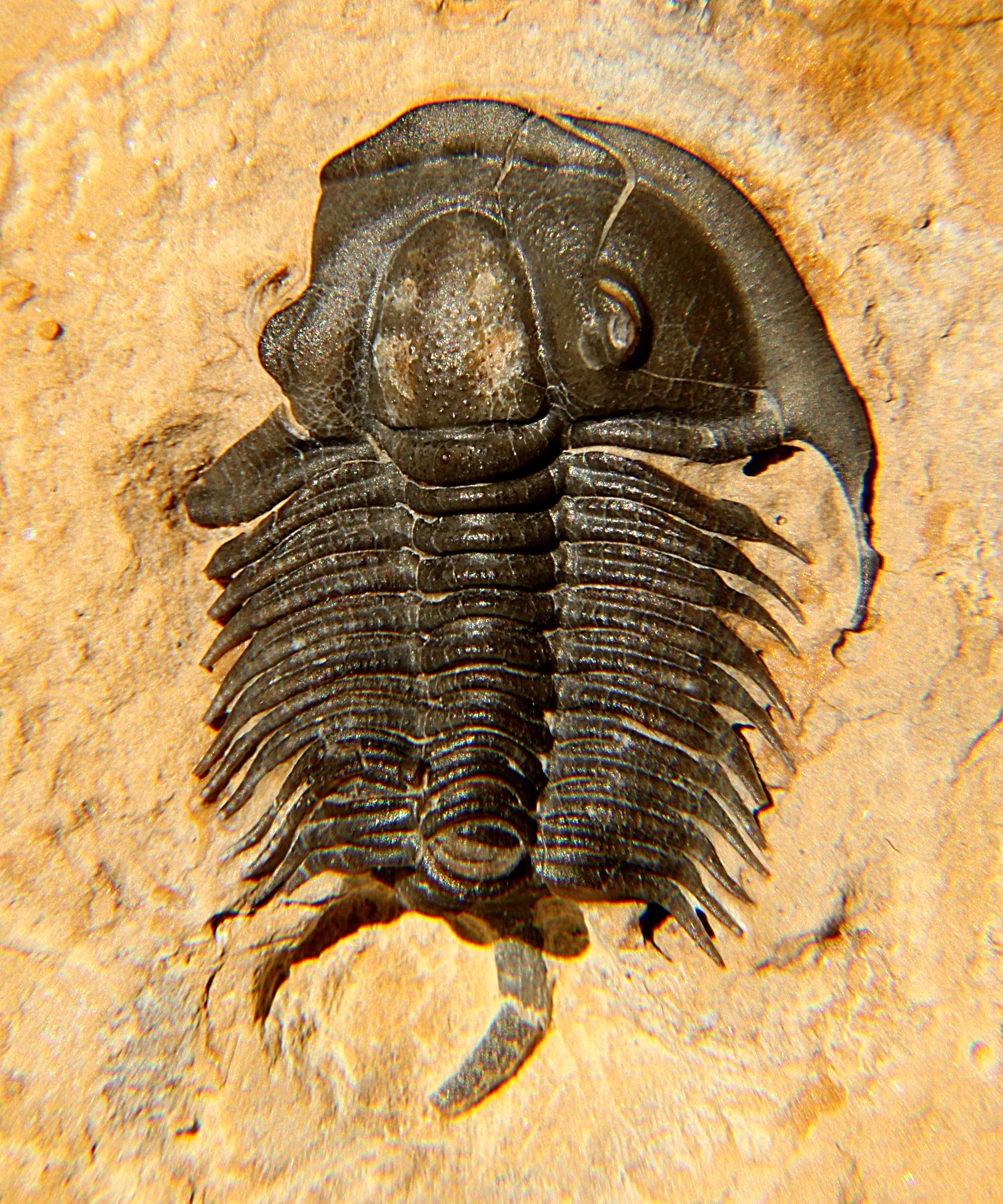
- Fossil of the Cambrian trilobite Tricrepicephalus
  †Tricrepicephalus
- †Triquitrites
  - †Triquitrites additus
  - †Triquitrites bransonii
  - †Triquitrites crassus
  - †Triquitrites protensus
  - †Triquitrites spinosus
- †Troosticrinus
  - †Troosticrinus minimus
- †Trophocrinus
  - †Trophocrinus corpulentus – type locality for species
  - †Trophocrinus exsertus – type locality for species
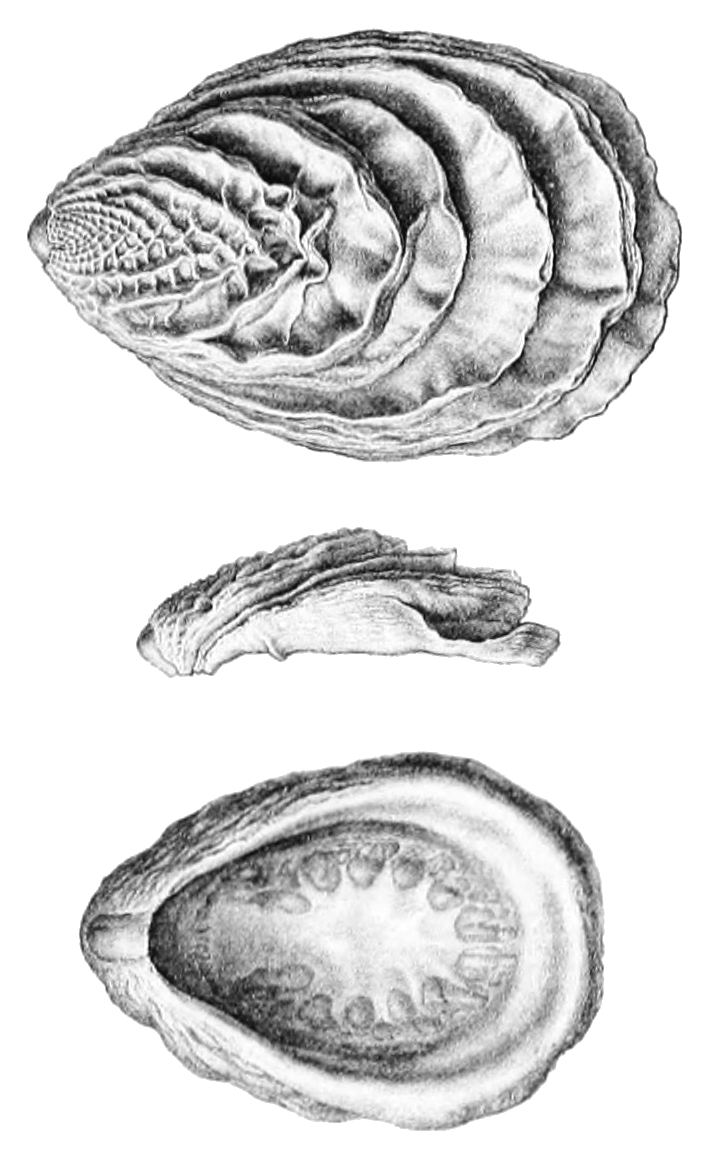
- Illustration of a fossilized shell in multiple views of the Silurian monoplacophoran mollusc Tryblidium reticulatum. Head region is to the left.
  †Tryblidium
  - †Tryblidium rugosum – type locality for species
- †Tuberculatosporites
  - †Tuberculatosporites robustus
- †Turritoma
  - †Turritoma acrea
- †Tylothyris
  - †Tylothyris missouriensis
  - †Tylothyris subvaricosa

== U ==
- †Ulrichoconus – type locality for genus
  - †Ulrichoconus bonneterrense – type locality for species

== V ==
- †Vellamo
  - †Vellamo diversa
- †Verrucosisporites
  - †Verrucosisporites grandiverrucosus
- †Verrusosisporites
  - †Verrusosisporites microtuberosus
  - †Verrusosisporites sifati
- †Vesicaspora
  - †Vesicaspora wilsonii
- †Vestispora
  - †Vestispora fenestrata
  - †Vestispora foveata
  - †Vestispora laevigata
- †Voiseyella
  - †Voiseyella mundula
- †Volsellina
  - †Volsellina subelliptica
- †Vorticina
  - †Vorticina cyrtolites

== W ==
- †Waagenella
  - †Waagenella crassus
- †Wellerella
  - †Wellerella osagensis – tentative report
  - †Wellerella tetrahedra
- †Wellerocystis
  - †Wellerocystis kimmswickensis
- †Whiteavesia
  - †Whiteavesia subcarinata
- †Whitfieldella
  - †Whitfieldella billingsana
- †Wibernia
  - †Wibernia halli
- †Wichitoceras
  - †Wichitoceras chadwickense
  - †Wichitoceras compressum
- †Wilbernia
  - †Wilbernia halli
- †Wilkingia
  - †Wilkingia terminale
- †Williamsella – type locality for genus
  - †Williamsella typicalis – type locality for species
- †Wilsonites
  - †Wilsonites delicatus
  - †Wilsonites vesicatus
- †Worthenia
  - †Worthenia tabulata

== X ==
- †Xenocheilos
  - †Xenocheilos orthos – type locality for species
  - †Xenocheilos spineum

== Z ==
- †Zeugopleura
  - †Zeugopleura jeffersonensis
- †Zophocrinidae – tentative report
- †Zygospira
  - †Zygospira deflecta
