= List of the prehistoric life of Missouri =

This list of the prehistoric life of Missouri contains the various prehistoric life-forms whose fossilized remains have been reported from within the US state of Missouri.

== Precambrian ==
The Paleobiology Database records no known occurrences of Precambrian fossils in Alabama.

== Paleozoic ==
=== Selected Paleozoic taxa of Missouri ===
- †Achatella
- †Achistrum
- †Acutimitoceras – tentative report
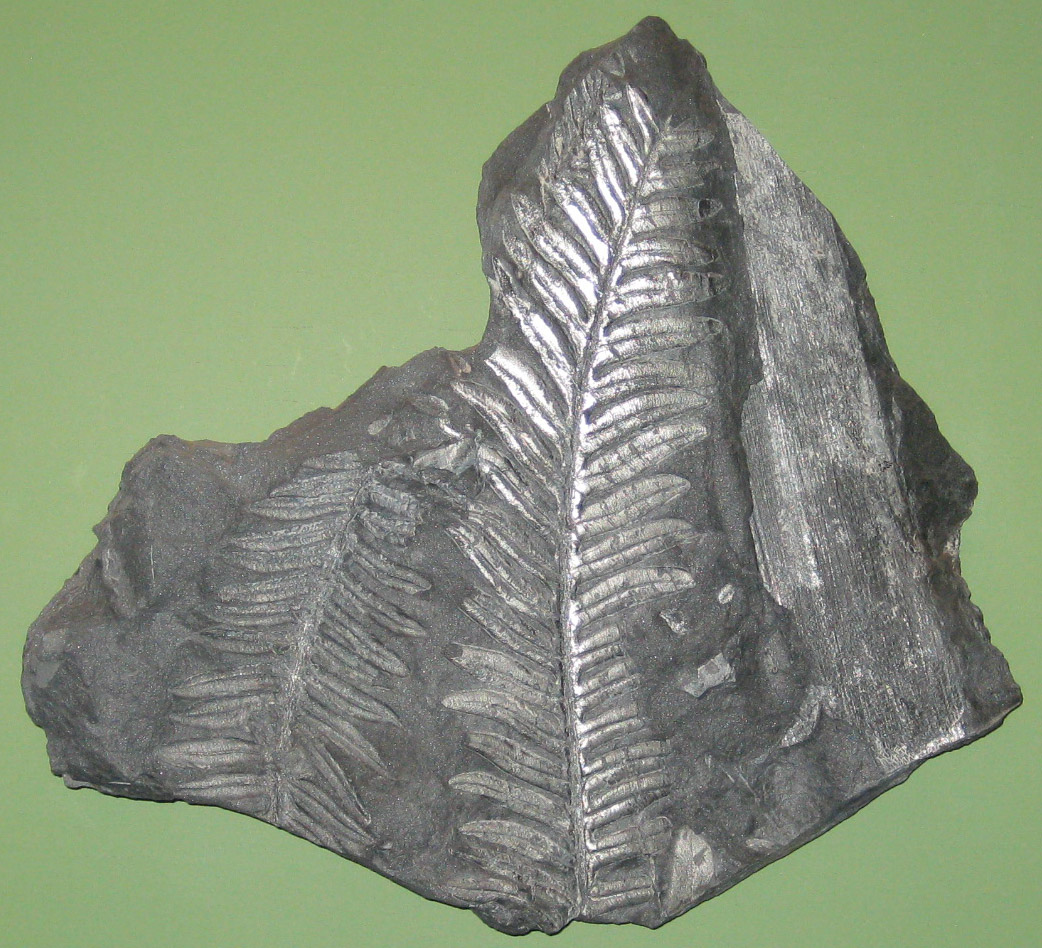
- Fossilized fronds of the Carboniferous-Early Cretaceous seed fern Alethopteris
  †Alethopteris
  - †Alethopteris davreuxi
  - †Alethopteris decurrens
  - †Alethopteris grandini
  - †Alethopteris serlii
  - †Alethopteris valida
- †Amphiscapha
- † Ananias
- †Annularia
  - †Annularia sphenophylloides
  - †Annularia stellata
- †Anomphalus
- †Anthracoceras
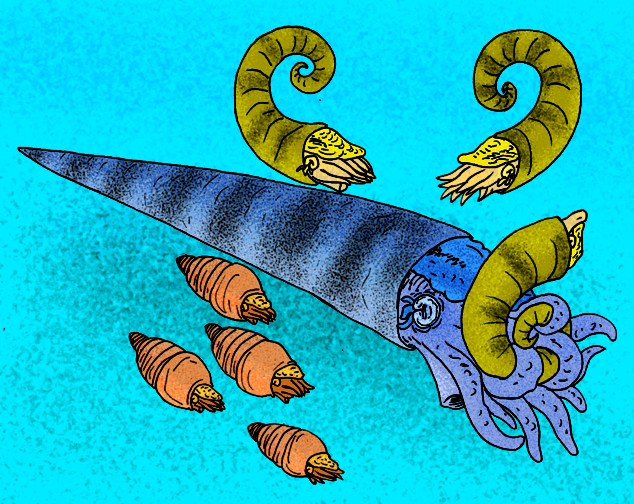
- Restoration of the Late Ordovician nautiloid cephalopod Aphetoceras being preyed upon by a Cameroceras
  †Aphetoceras
- †Aphlebia
- †Archeognathus – type locality for genus
- †Artisia
- †Asterotheca
- †Athyris
  - †Athyris fultonensis
  - †Athyris lamellosa
- †Aulochiton – type locality for genus
- †Aviculopecten
  - †Aviculopecten gradicosta
- †Avonia
- †Bellerophon
  - †Bellerophon graphicus
  - †Bellerophon jeffersonensis – type locality for species
- †Bembexia
- †Beyrichoceras
- †Bisatoceras
- †Bolbocephalus
- †Bumastus
  - †Bumastus trentonensis
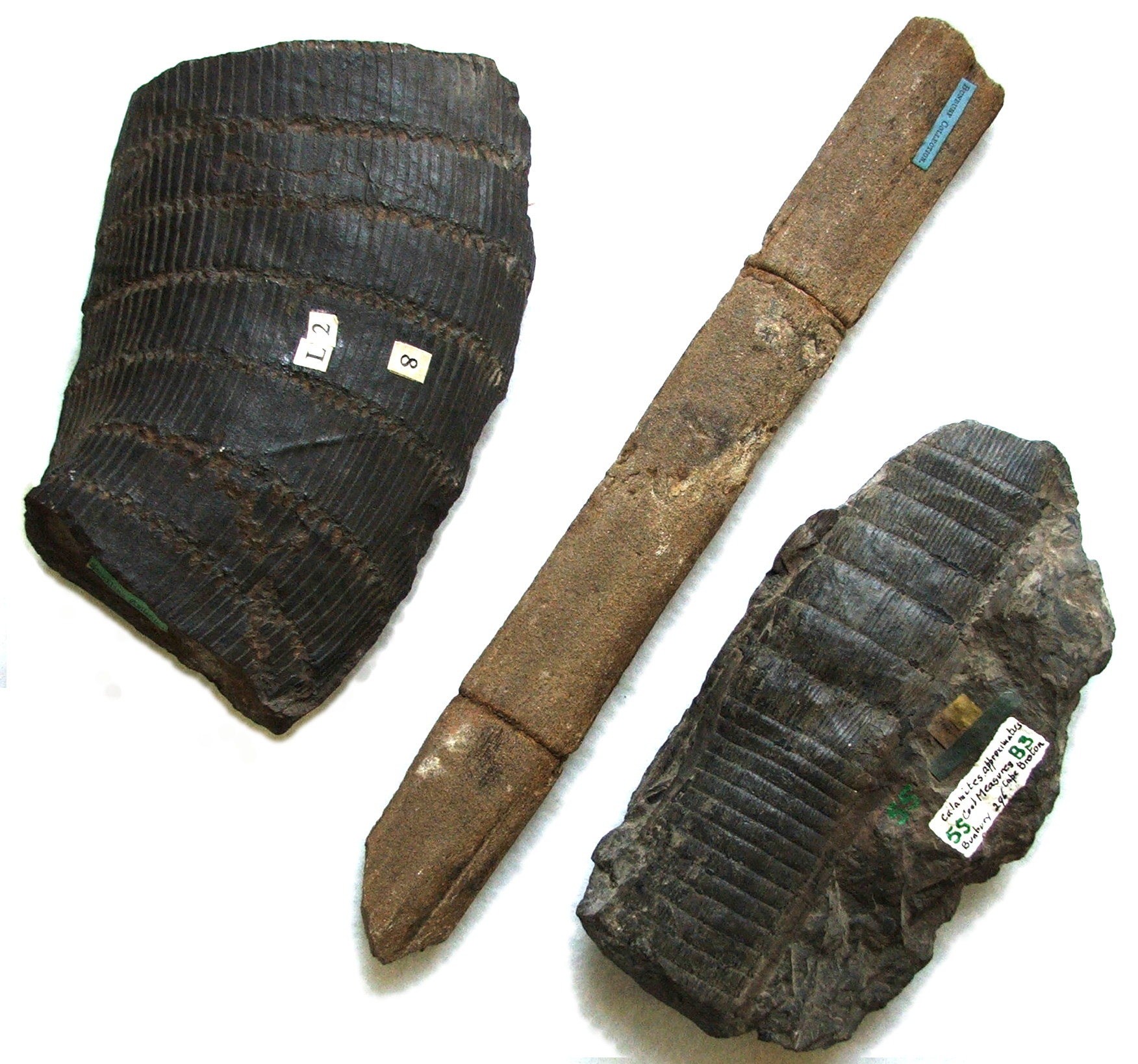
- Fossilized stems from the Carboniferous-Permian horsetail relative Calamites
  †Calamites
  - †Calamites carinatus
  - †Calamites cistii
  - †Calamites cruciatus
  - †Calamites suckowii
- †Calyptaulax
- †Camarotoechia
  - †Camarotoechia elegantula
  - †Camarotoechia horsfordi
  - †Camarotoechia tuta
- †Campbelloceras
- †Cardiocarpus
- †Cavusgnathus
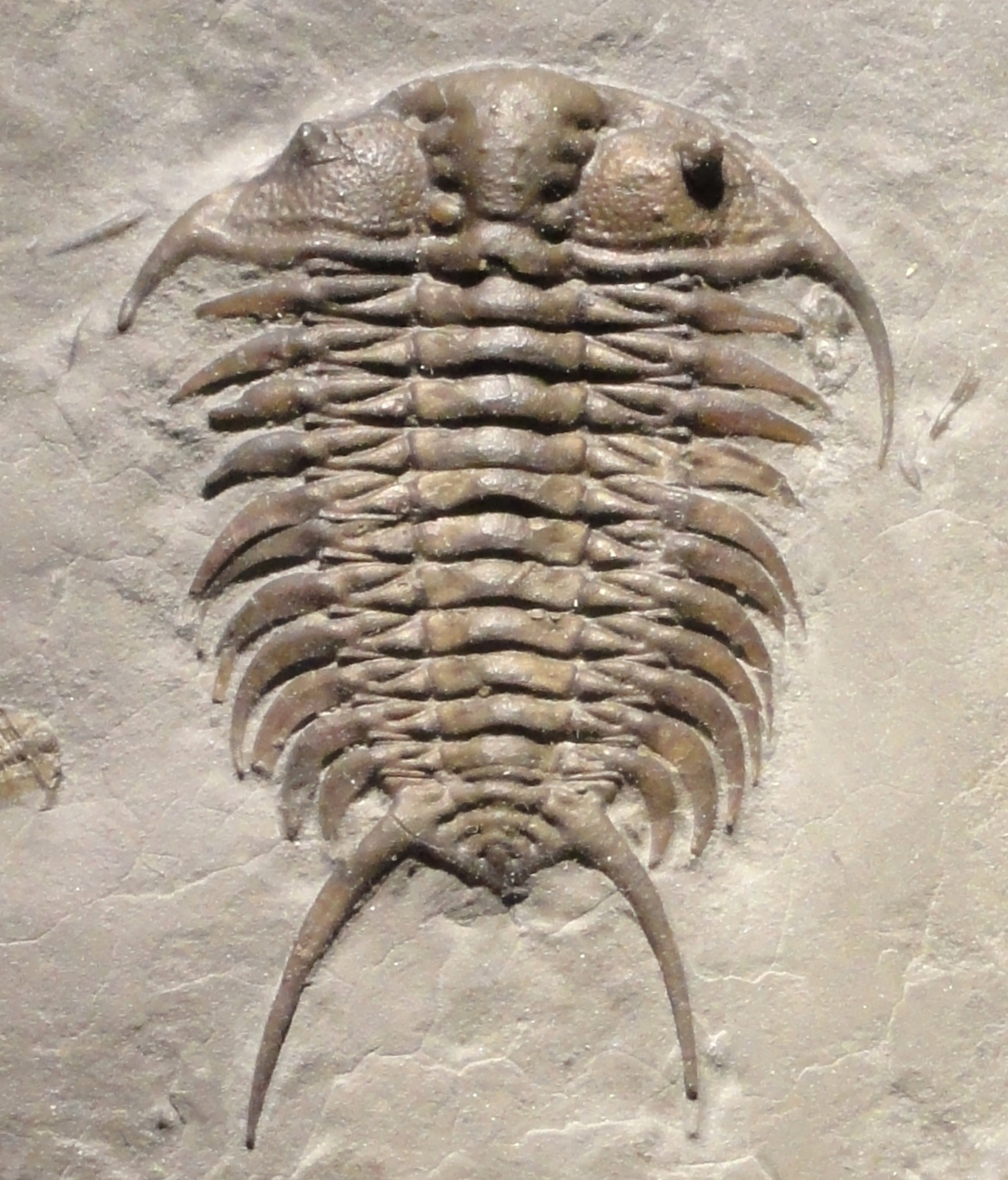
- Fossil of the Middle-Late Ordovician trilobite Ceraurus
  †Ceraurus
- †Chelodes
- †Chonetes
  - †Chonetes geniculatus
  - †Chonetes mesoloba
  - †Chonetes ornatus
- †Clarkoceras
- †Cleiothyridina
  - †Cleiothyridina incrassata
  - †Cleiothyridina orbicularis
- †Cliftonia
- †Coenocystis
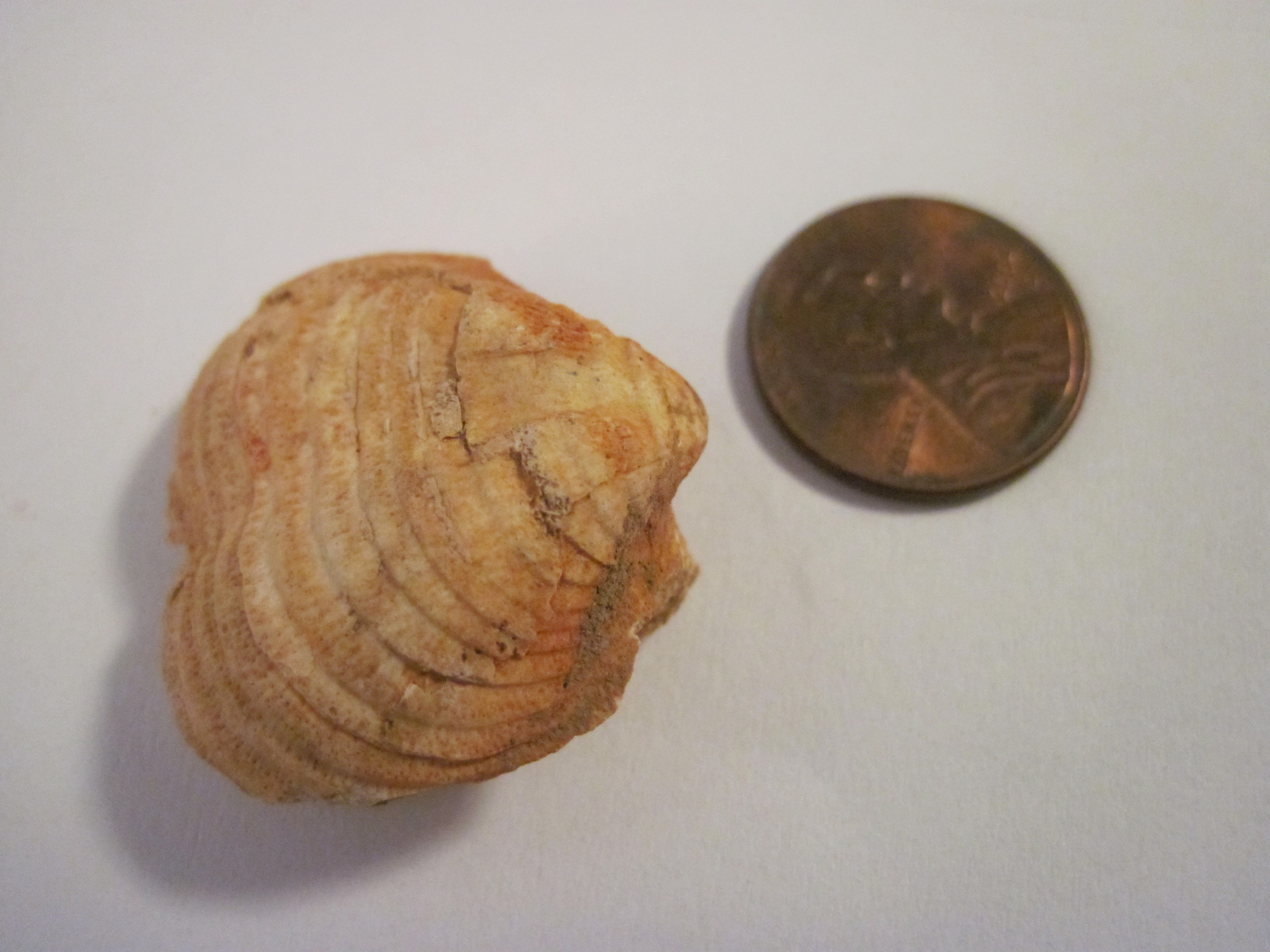
- Fossilized shell of the Late Devonian-Permian brachiopod Composita
  †Composita
  - †Composita elongata
  - †Composita ovata
  - †Composita subtilita
  - †Composita tetralobata
- †Conocardium
- †Coolinia
- †Cordaicarpus
- †Cordaites
  - †Cordaites crassinervis
  - †Cordaites principalis
- †Cornuella – type locality for genus
- †Cornulites
- †Crania
- †Crepipora
  - †Crepipora globulifera – type locality for species
- †Curtognathus
- †Cyclonema
- †Cyclopteris
- †Cyphaspis
- †Cyrtoceras
- †Cyrtolites
- †Dalmanites
- †Deckera
- † Della
- †Dicoelosia
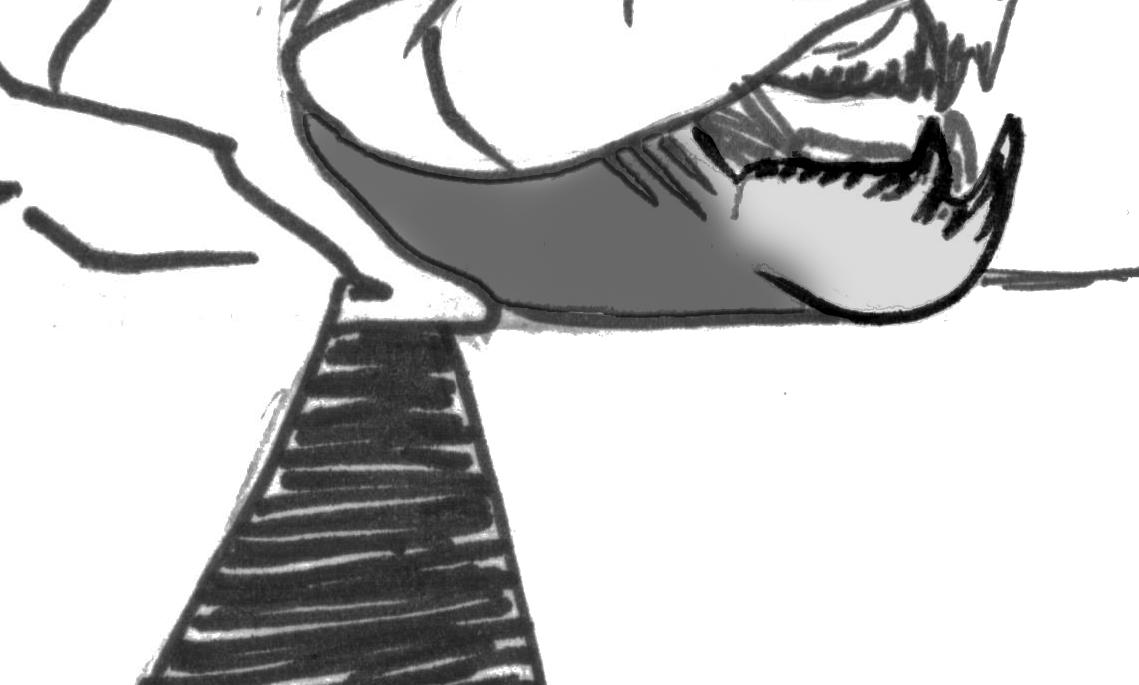
- Illustration of the jaws of Dinichthys
  †Dinichthys
- †Domatoceras
- †Dorycordaites
- †Earlandia
- †Echinosphaerites
- †Edmondia
- †Ellesmeroceras
- Eocaudina
- †Eospirifer
- †Euomphalus
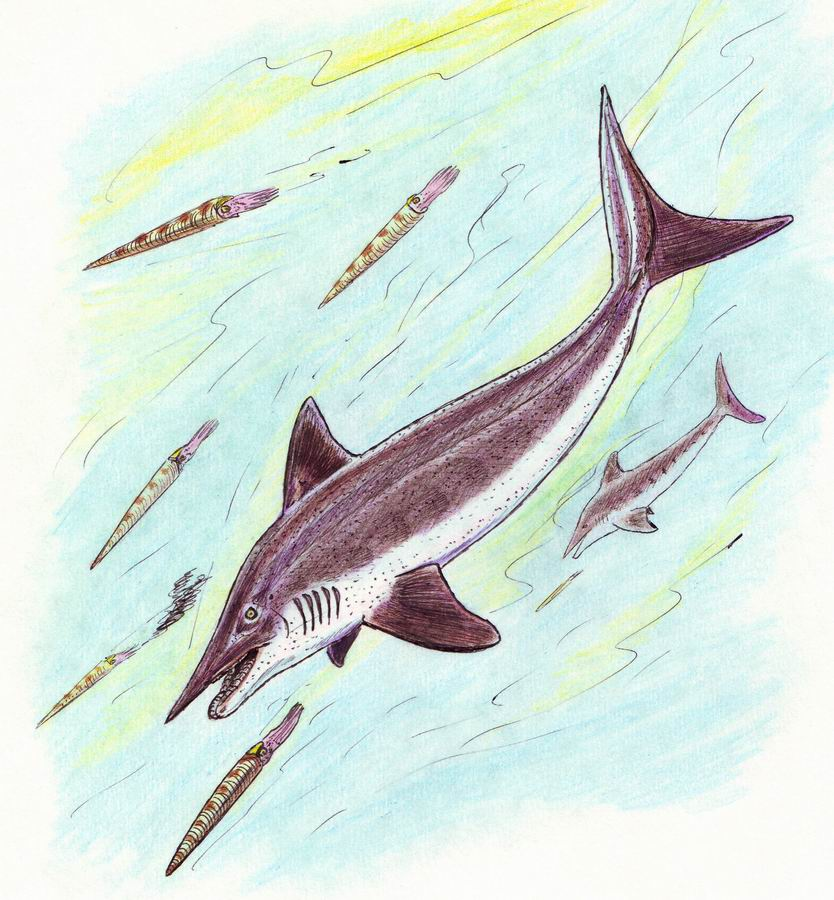
- Life restoration of the Permian Chimaera relative Fadenia
  †Fadenia
- †Favosites
- †Flexicalymene
  - †Flexicalymene senaria
- †Gervillia
- †Glossina
- †Gnathodus
  - †Gnathodus typicus
- †Gondolella
- †Halysites
- †Helcionopsis
- †Hemithecella – type locality for genus
- †Hindia
- †Holia – type locality for genus
- †Holopea
- †Hyolithes
- †Hypseloconus
- †Idiognathodus
- †Irvingella
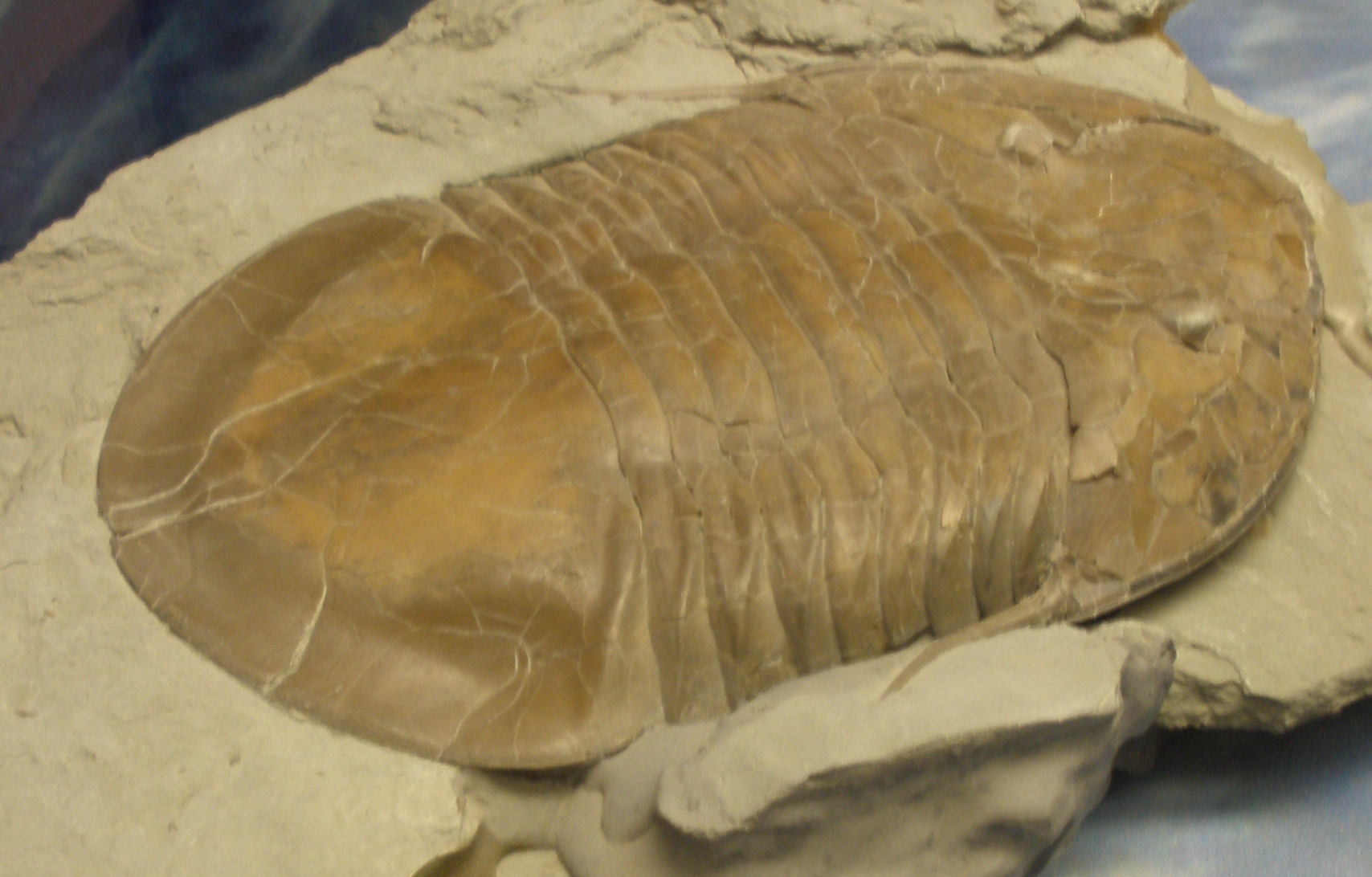
- Fossil of the Middle-Late Ordovician giant trilobite Isotelus.
  †Isotelus
  - †Isotelus gigas
  - †Isotelus maximus
- †Jeffersonia
- †Kendallina
- †Kirengella
- †Kirkella – type locality for genus
- †Lepidophyllum
- †Lingula
- †Liroceras
- †Matthevia
- †Maximites
- †Meristella
- †Meristina
- †Metacoceras
- †Murchisonia – tentative report
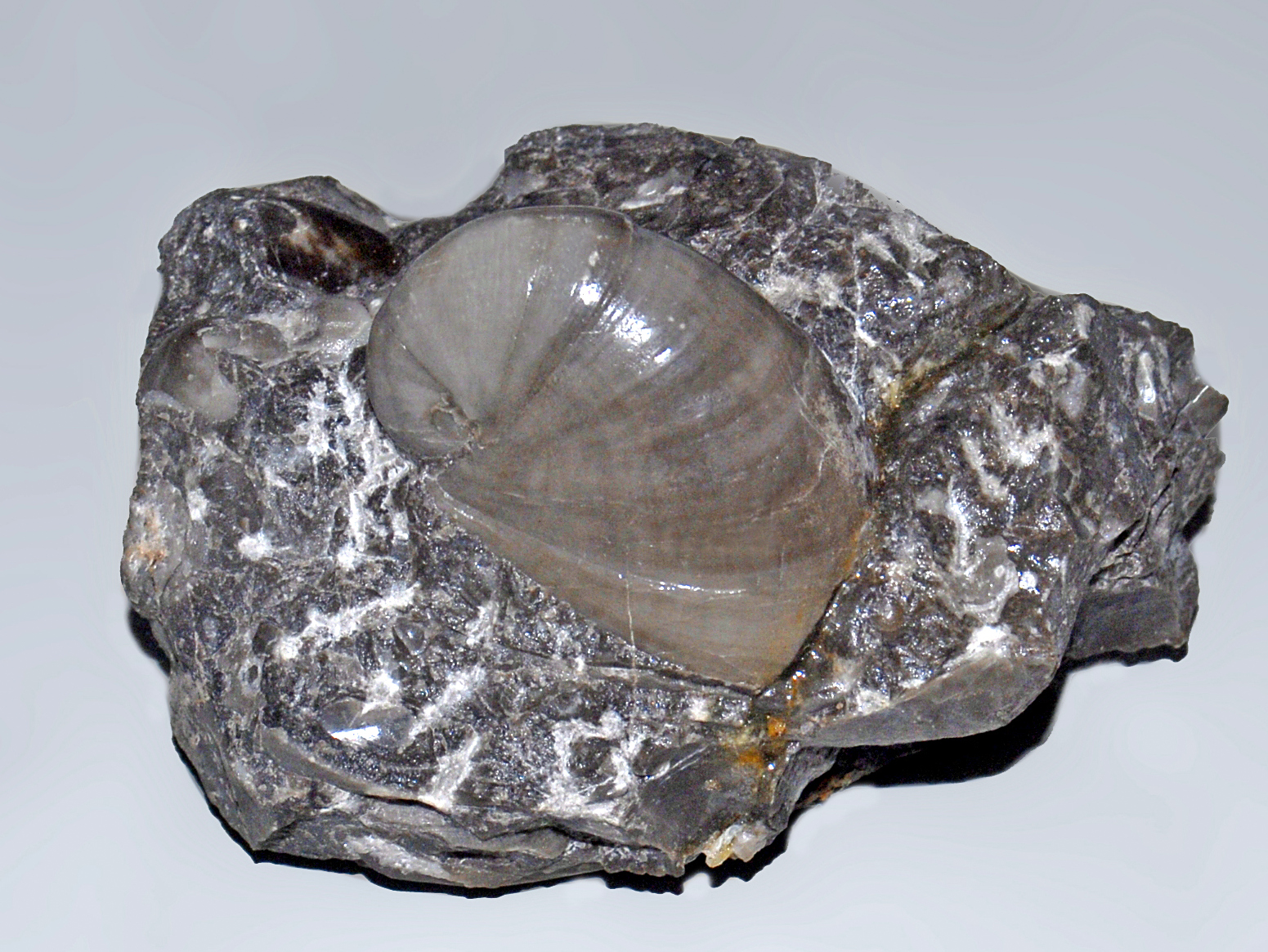
- Fossilized shell of the Early Devonian – Triassic sea snail Naticopsis
  †Naticopsis
  - †Naticopsis judithae – type locality for species
  - †Naticopsis marthaae – type locality for species
  - †Naticopsis scintilla – type locality for species
  - †Naticopsis wortheniana – type locality for species
- †Neospirifer
  - †Neospirifer cameratus
  - †Neospirifer goreii
  - †Neospirifer latus
  - †Neospirifer triplicatus
- †Neuropteris
  - †Neuropteris caudata
  - †Neuropteris flexuosa
  - †Neuropteris heterophylla
  - †Neuropteris ovata
  - †Neuropteris rarinervis
  - †Neuropteris scheuchzeri
  - †Neuropteris tenuifolia
- Nucula
- †Oncagnostus
  - †Oncagnostus tumidosus
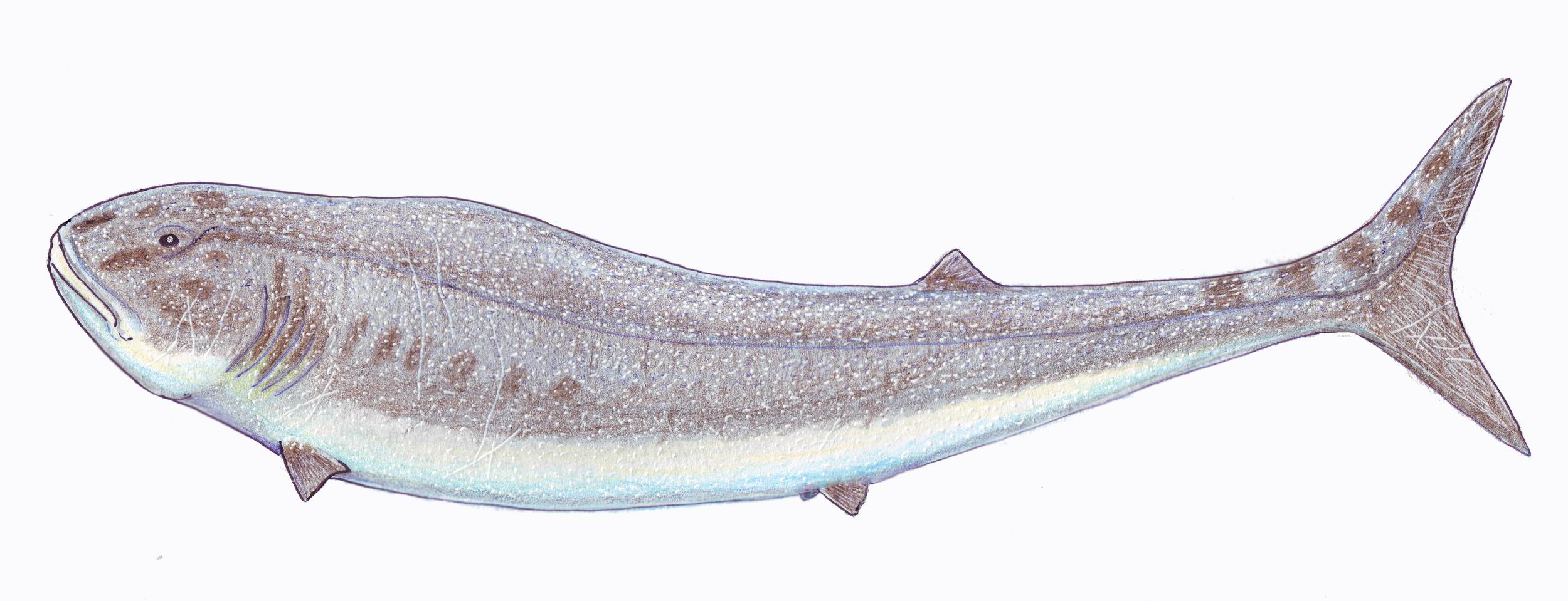
- Restoration of the Carboniferous-Permian cartilaginous fish Orodus
  †Orodus
- †Orthoceras
- †Orygmaspis
- †Oulodus
- †Ozarkodina
- †Palaeoniscus
- †Paradycheia – type locality for genus
- †Pecopteris
  - †Pecopteris unita
- †Phillipsia – tentative report
- †Phragmolites
- †Pinnularia
- †Platyceras
- †Pleurocystites
- †Plicochonetes
- †Polygnathus
  - †Polygnathus communis
- †Prioniodus
- †Proetus
- †Pseudopolygnathus
- †Pteridosperm
- †Pterotheca
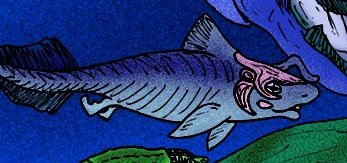
- Life restoration of the Late Devonian placoderm fish Ptyctodus
  †Ptyctodus
- †Quadratia
- †Receptaculites
- †Remopleurides
- †Robustum – type locality for genus
  - †Robustum nodum – type locality for species
- †Rota
- †Shelbyoceras – type locality for genus
- †Sigillaria
- †Skenidioides
- Solemya
- †Spathognathodus
- †Sphaerocoryphe
- †Sphenophyllum
  - †Sphenophyllum emarginatum
  - †Sphenophyllum longifolium
  - †Sphenophyllum majus
- †Sphenopteris
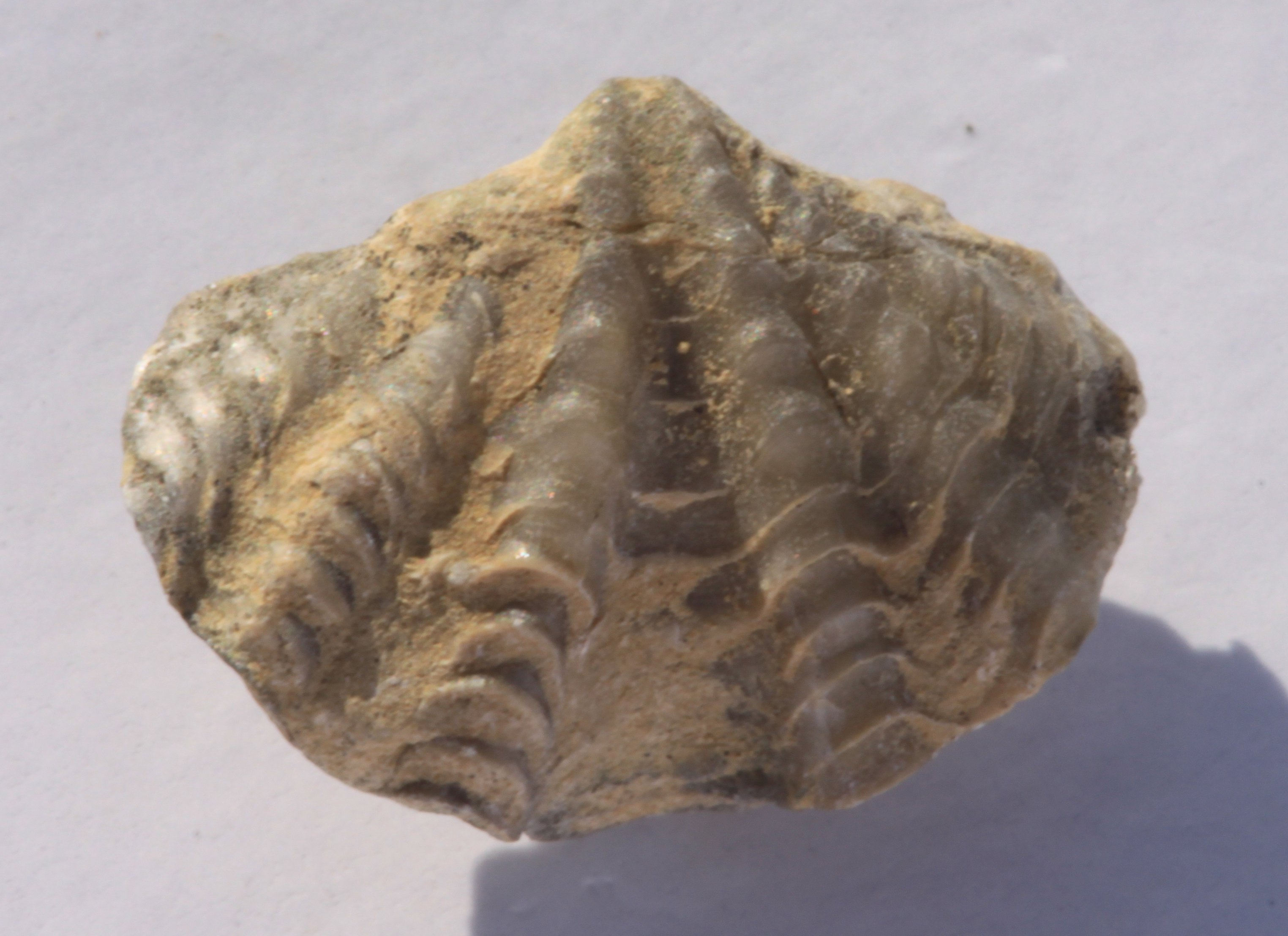
- Fossilized shell of the Late Ordovician-Late Triassic brachiopod Spirifer
  †Spirifer
  - †Spirifer marionensis
  - †Spirifer opimus
  - †Spirifer rockymontanus
- Spirorbis
- †Spyroceras
- †Strepsodiscus
- †Streptognathodus
  - †Streptognathodus clarki – type locality for species
- †Strophomena
  - †Strophomena incurvata
- †Subulites
- †Tarphyceras
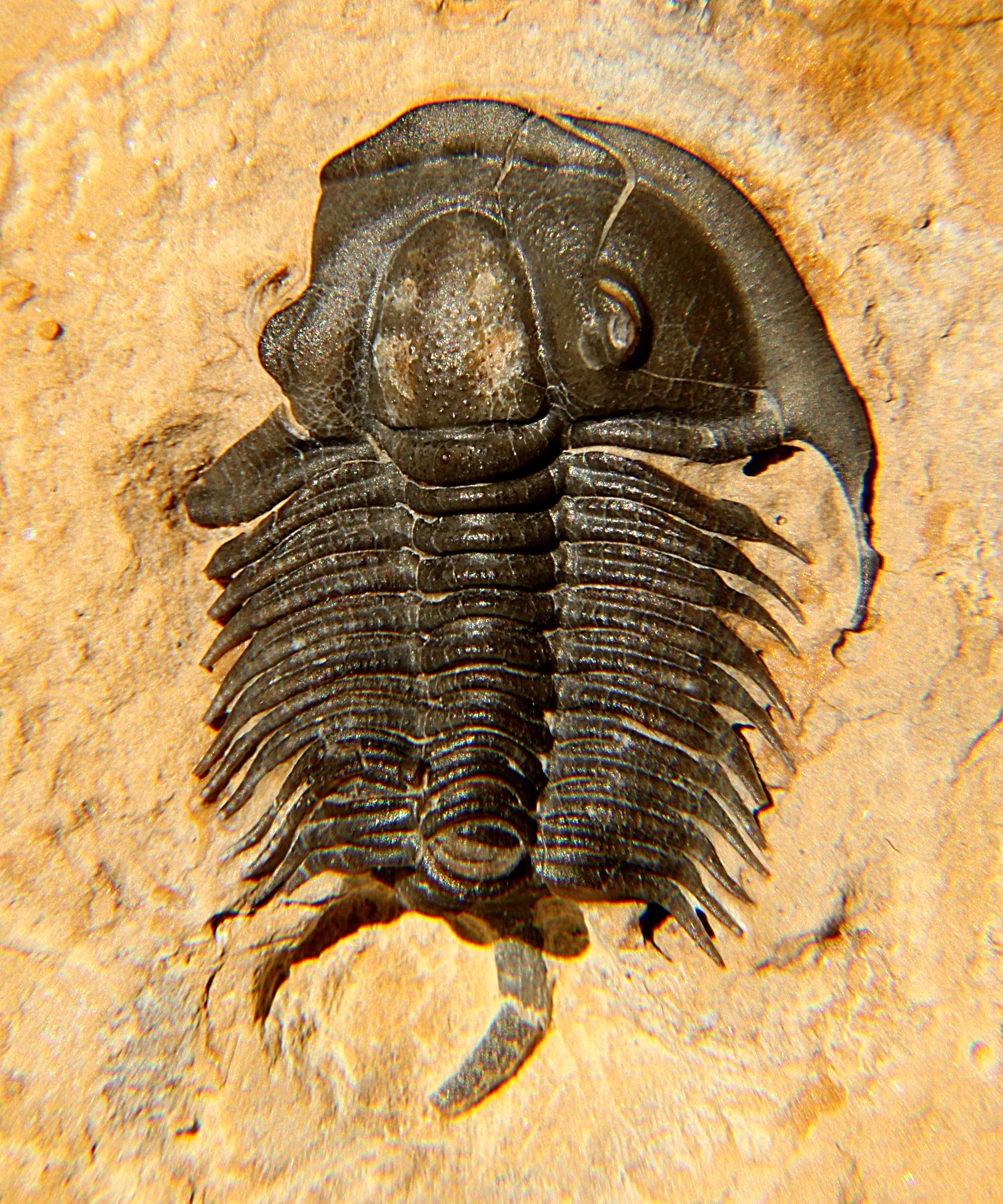
- Fossil of the Cambrian trilobite Tricrepicephalus
  †Tricrepicephalus
- †Tryblidium
- †Vellamo
- †Whiteavesia
- †Wilkingia
- †Worthenia

== Mesozoic ==
- †Acteon
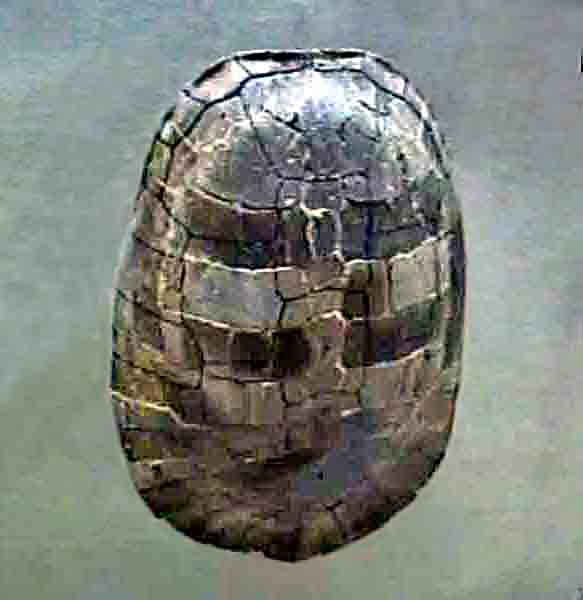
- Fossilized shell of the Early Cretaceous-Oligocene turtle Adocus
  †Adocus
- †Aenona
  - †Aenona eufaulensis
- †Albertosaurus
- †Ambigostrea
  - †Ambigostrea tecticosta
- Amuletum
- †Anatimya
  - †Anatimya anteradiata
- †Anchura
- †Anomia
  - †Anomia ornata
- †Aphrodina
  - †Aphrodina tippana
- Arrhoges
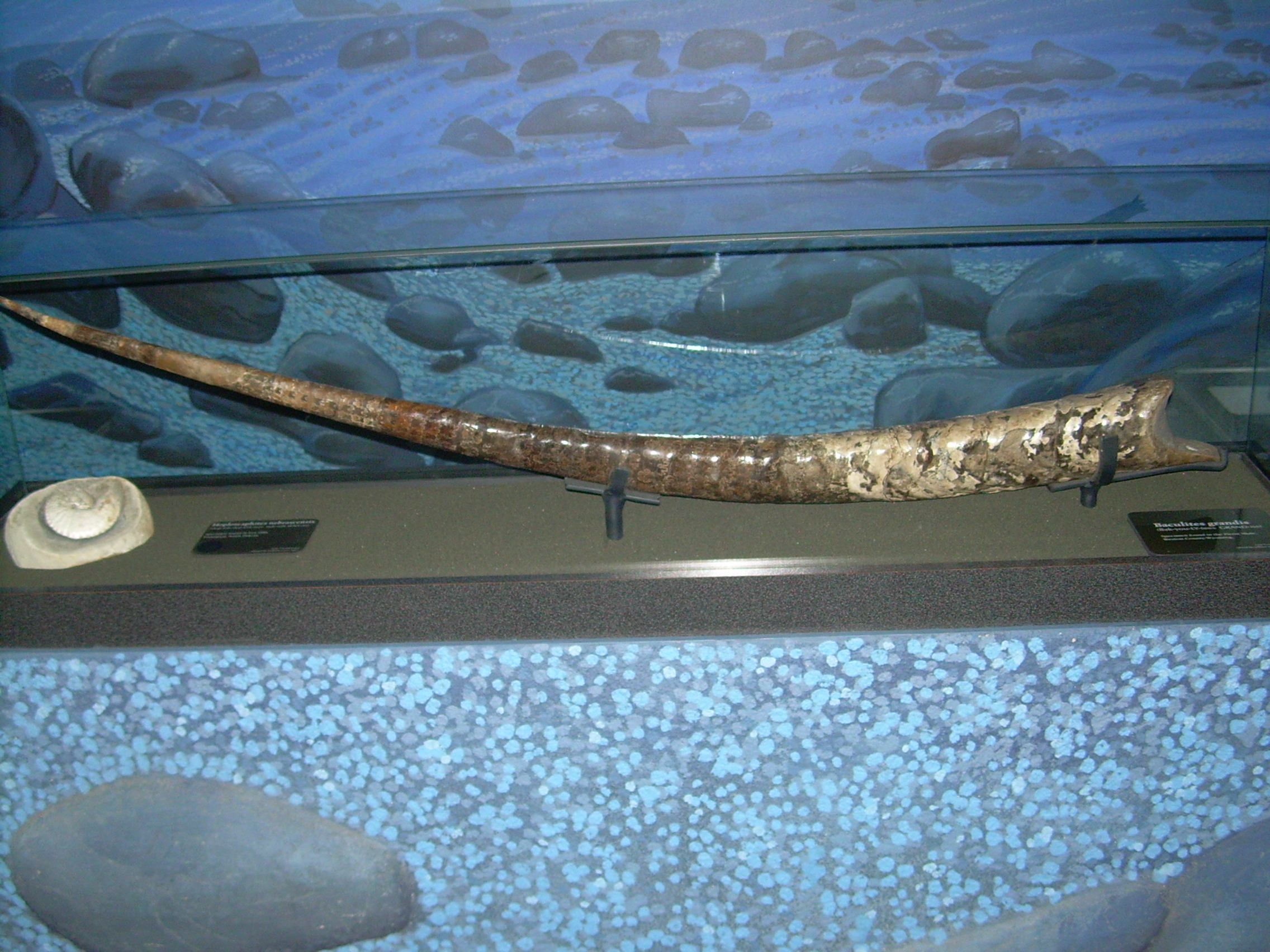
- Fossilized shell of the Late Cretaceous ammonoid cephalopod Baculites
  †Baculites
  - †Baculites tippahensis
- †Bellifusus
- †Belliscala
- †Bullopsis
  - †Bullopsis cretacea
- Caestocorbula
  - †Caestocorbula crassaplica
  - †Caestocorbula crassiplica
  - †Caestocorbula percompressa
- †Camptonectes
  - †Camptonectes bubonis
  - †Camptonectes hilgardi
- †Caveola
- Cerithiella
  - †Cerithiella semirugatum
- †Clavipholas
  - †Clavipholas pectorosa
- Cliona
- †Clisocolus
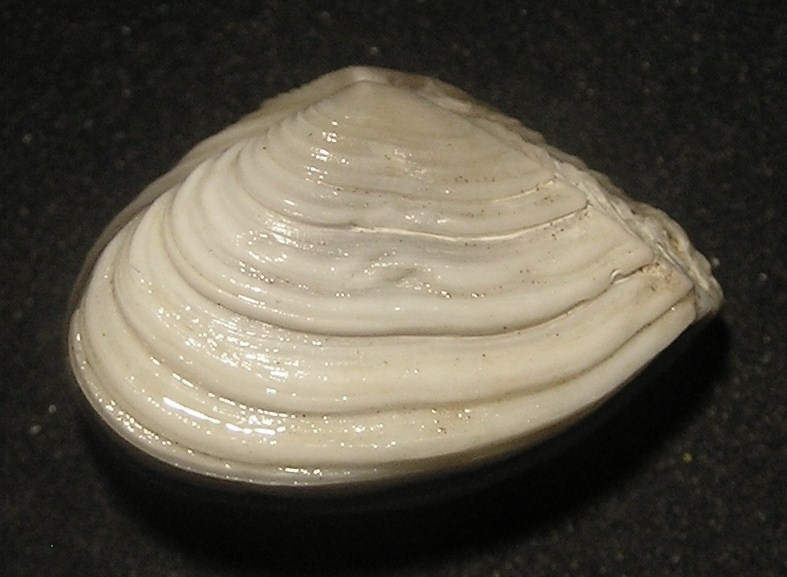
- Shell of a Corbula basket clam
  Corbula
- Crassatella
  - †Crassatella vadosa
- †Crenella
  - †Crenella elegantula
  - †Crenella serica
- Cucullaea
  - †Cucullaea capax
- †Cymbophora
  - †Cymbophora appressa
  - †Cymbophora berryi
- †Cymella
  - †Cymella bella
- †Cyprimeria
  - †Cyprimeria alta
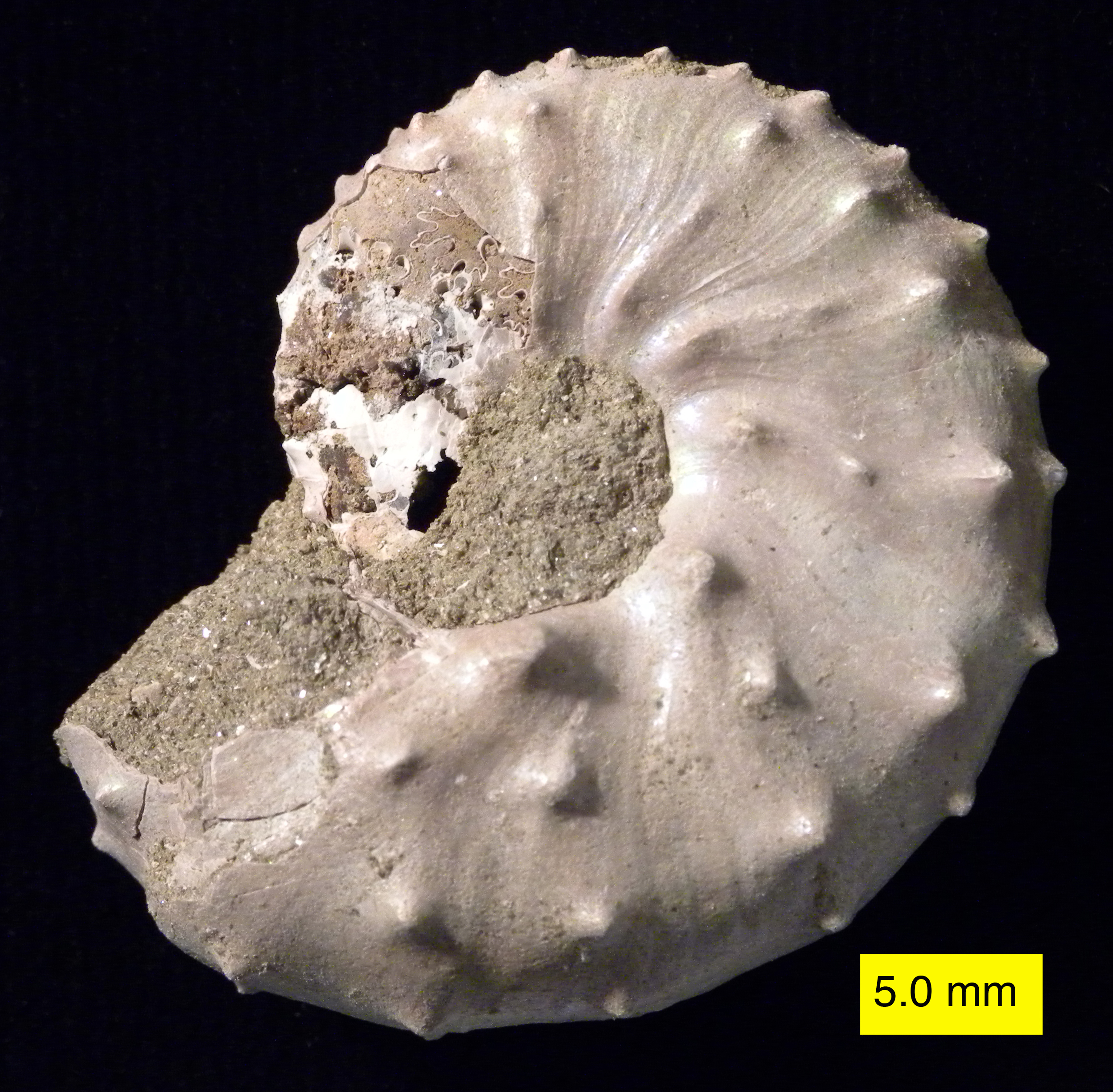
- Fossilized shell of the Late Cretaceous ammonoid cephalopod Discoscaphites
  †Discoscaphites
  - †Discoscaphites iris
- †Drilluta
- †Eoacteon
  - †Eoacteon linteus
- †Eoharpa
  - †Eoharpa sinuosa
- †Eubaculites
  - †Eubaculites carinatus
- †Eufistulana
  - †Eufistulana ripleyana
- †Eufistulina
- †Euspira
  - †Euspira rectilabrum
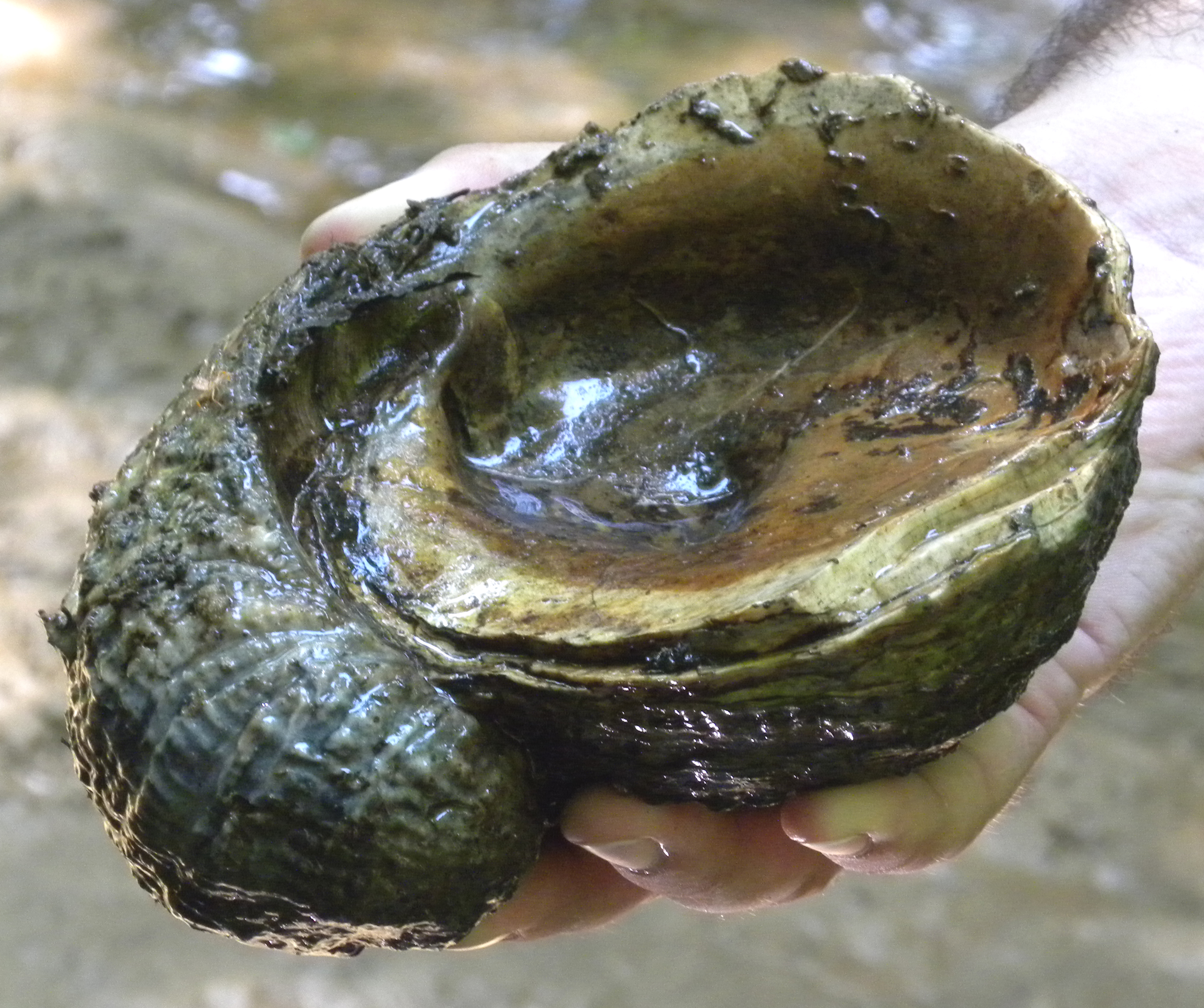
- Interior of a fossilized shell of the Jurassic-Cretaceous foam oyster Exogyra
  †Exogyra
  - †Exogyra costata
- †Fulgerca
- Fusinus
  - †Fusinus macnairyensis – or unidentified related form
- Glycymeris
  - †Glycymeris compressa
  - †Glycymeris rotundata
- †Goniochasma – tentative report
- †Granocardium
  - †Granocardium lowei
  - †Granocardium tippananum
  - †Granocardium tippanum
- †Gryphaeostrea
  - †Gryphaeostrea vomer
- Gyrodes
  - †Gyrodes spillmani
  - †Gyrodes supraplicatus
- †Hamulus
  - †Hamulus onyx
  - †Hamulus squamosus
- †Helicaulax
  - †Helicaulax formosa
- Juliacorbula
  - †Juliacorbula monmouthensis
- †Legumen
  - †Legumen ellipticum
- †Leptosolen
  - †Leptosolen biplicata
- Lima
  - †Lima pelagica
- Limatula
  - †Limatula acutilineata
- †Linearis
  - †Linearis metastriata
- †Liopeplum
  - †Liopeplum rugosum
- †Liopistha
  - †Liopistha protexta
- †Liothyris
- †Lowenstamia
- †Lycettia
  - †Lycettia tippana
  - †Lycettia tippanus
- Malletia
  - †Malletia longfrons
  - †Malletia longifrons
- †Micrabacia
- †Morea
  - †Morea transenna
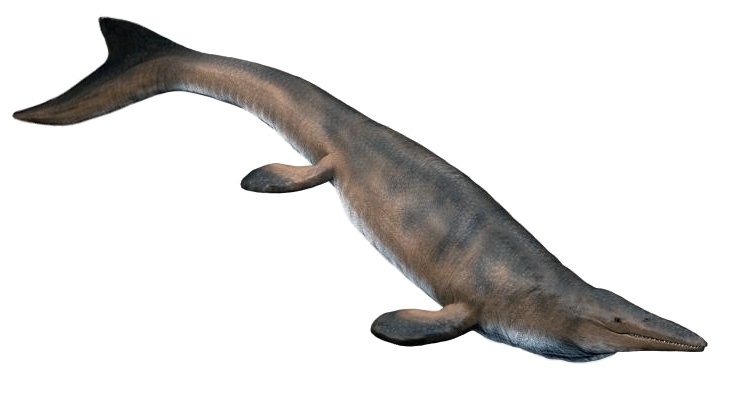
- Life restoration of two of the Late Cretaceous Mosasaurus
  †Mosasaurus
  - †Mosasaurus hoffmanni
- †Naomichelys
- †Napulus
  - †Napulus octoliratus
- †Nemocardium
  - †Nemocardium fragile
- †Nemodon
  - †Nemodon eufalensis
  - †Nemodon eufaulensis
- Nucula
  - †Nucula camia
  - †Nucula percrassa
- Nuculana
  - †Nuculana whitfieldi
- †Opertochasma
- †Paladmete
  - †Paladmete cancellaria
- Panopea
  - †Panopea monmouthensis
- †Parmicorbula
  - †Parmicorbula percompressa
- †Parrosaurus – type locality for genus
  - †Parrosaurus missouriensis
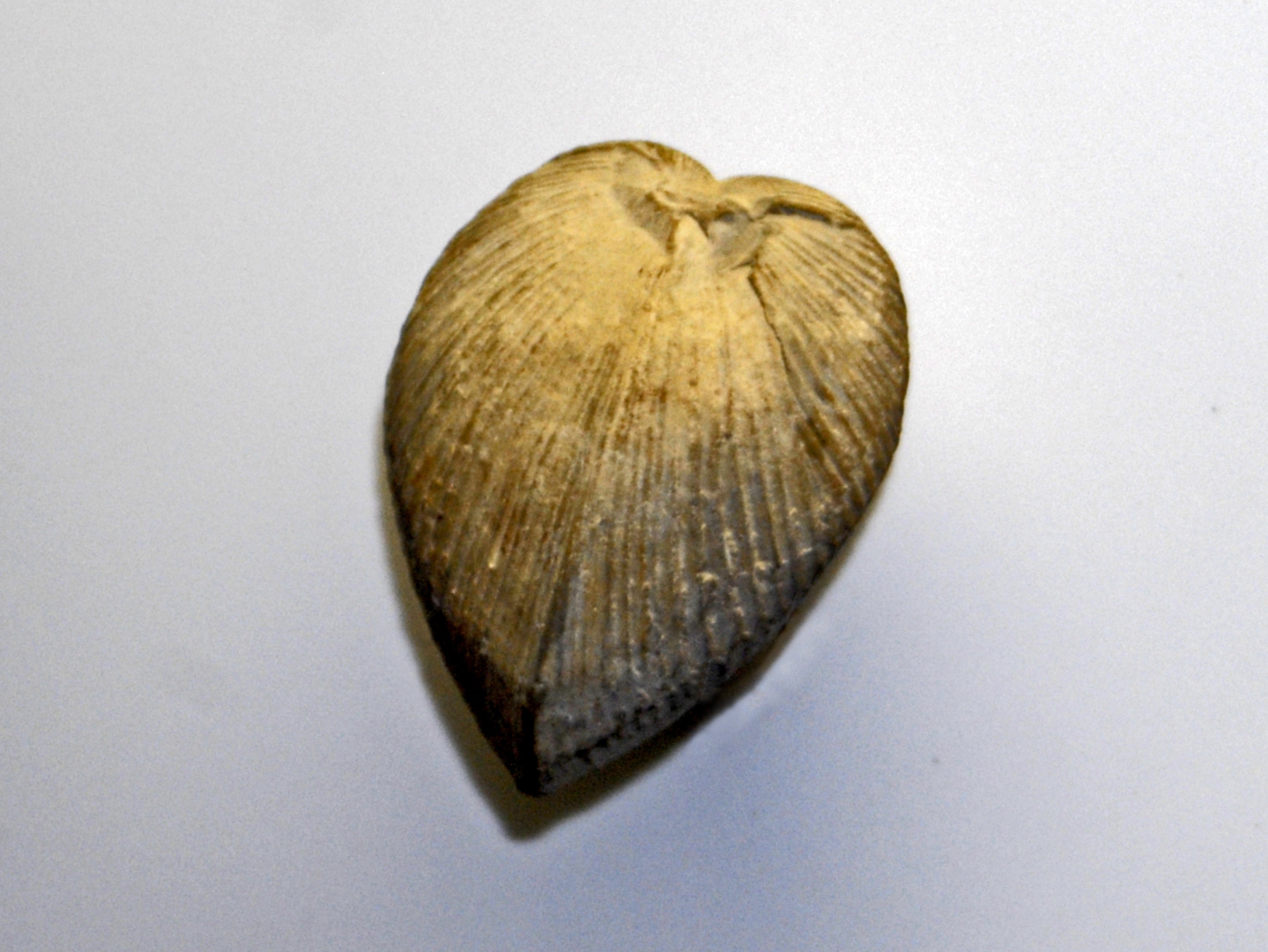
- Fossilized shell of the Early Triassic-Pliocene marine bivalve Pholadomya
  Pholadomya
  - †Pholadomya occidentalis
- †Pinna
  - †Pinna laqueata
- †Pleuriocardia
- †Praeleda
  - †Praeleda compar
- †Protocardia
  - †Protocardia spillmani
- Pseudomalaxis
  - †Pseudomalaxis pateriformis
- †Pterotrigonia
  - †Pterotrigonia angulicostata
  - †Pterotrigonia eufalensis
  - †Pterotrigonia eufaulensis
- †Pyropsis
- †Scambula
  - †Scambula perplana
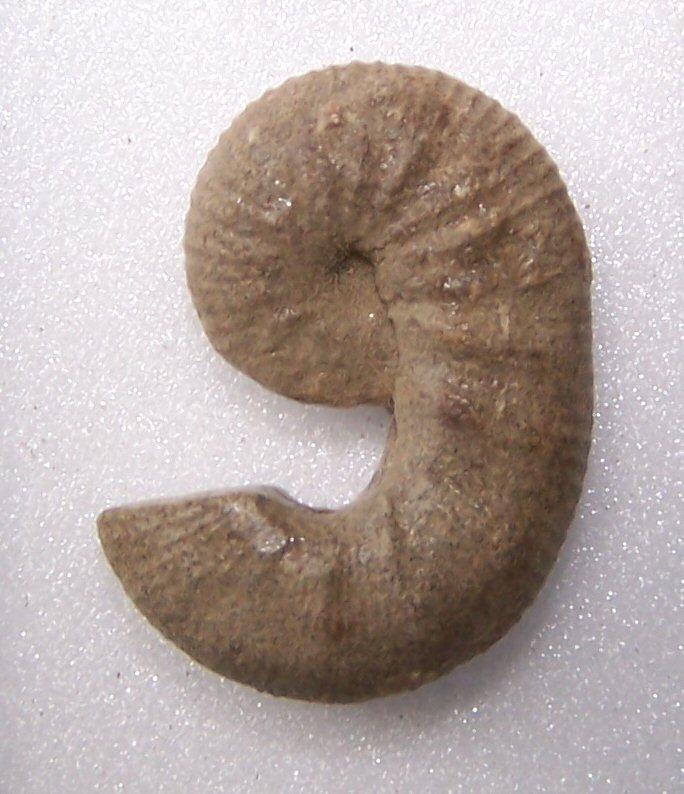
- Fossilized shell of the Late Cretaceous ammonoid cephalopod Scaphites
  †Scaphites
- Serpula
- Striarca
  - †Striarca cuneata
  - †Striarca saffordi
- †Syncyclonema
  - †Syncyclonema simplicius
- Tellina
- †Tellinimera
  - †Tellinimera buboana
- †Tenea
  - †Tenea parilis
- †Tenuipteria
  - †Tenuipteria argentea
  - †Tenuipteria argenteus
- Trachycardium
- †Trobus
  - †Trobus buboanus
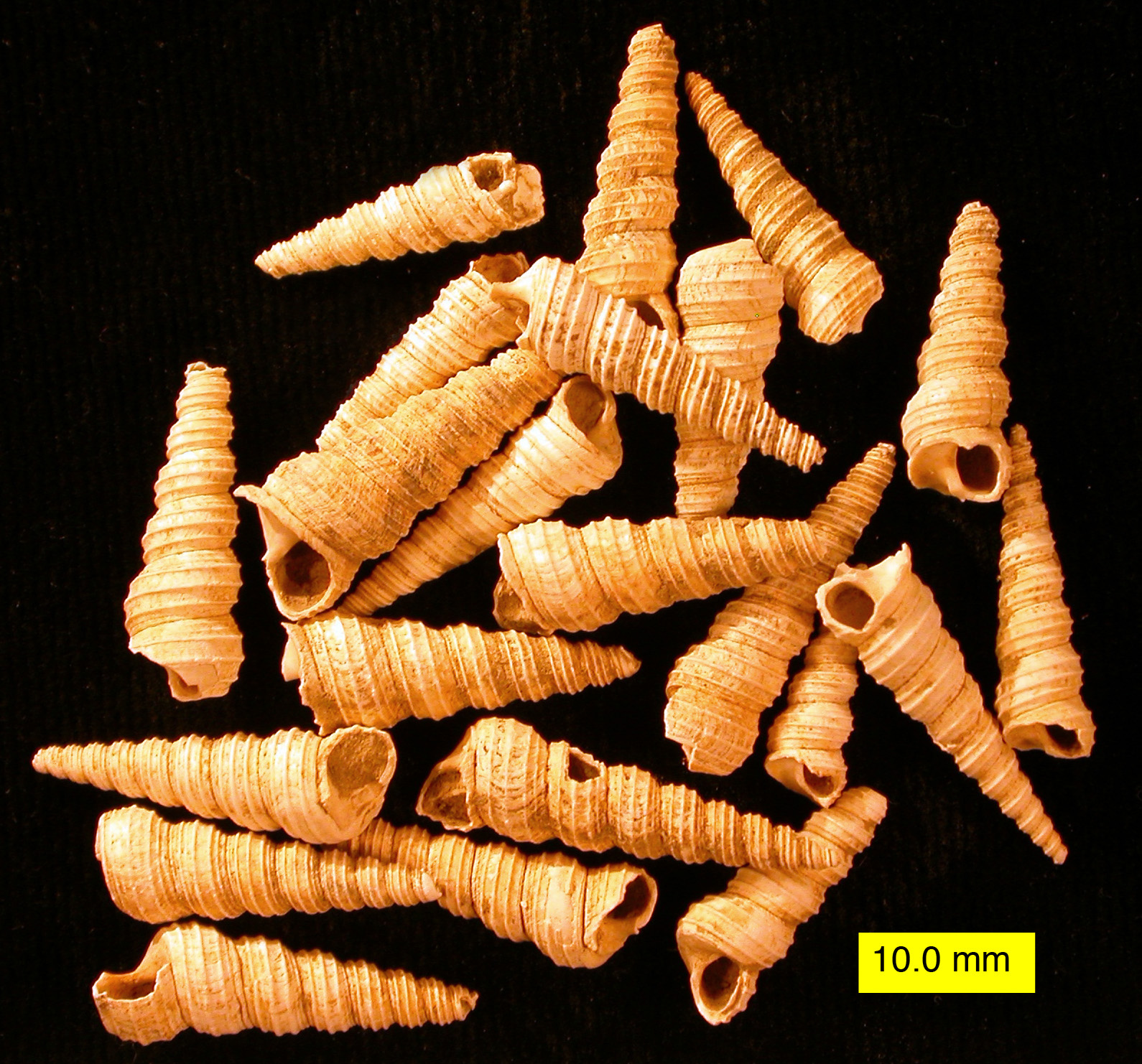
- Fossilized shells of the Late Jurassic-modern tower snail Turritella
  Turritella
  - †Turritella bilira
  - †Turritella chalybeatensis
  - †Turritella tippana
  - †Turritella vertebroides
- †Unicardium
- †Urceolabrum
  - †Urceolabrum tuberculatum
- †Veniella
  - †Veniella conradi
- †Volutomorpha
- †Weeksia

== Cenozoic ==
- Alligator
- †Arctodus
  - †Arctodus simus
- Bison
- †Bootherium
- Bufo
  - †Bufo woodhousei
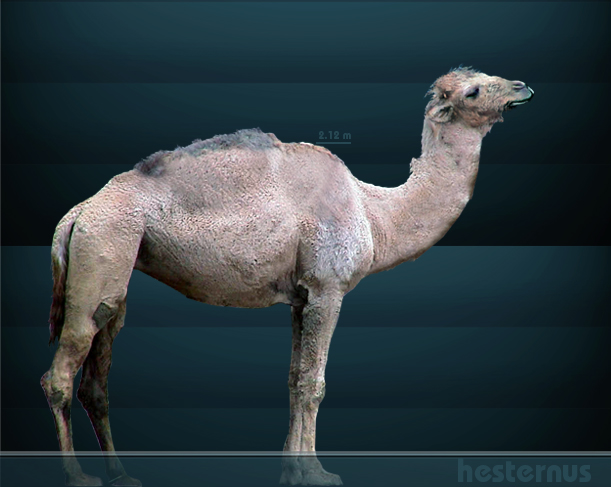
- Life restoration of the Pliocene-Holocene camel Camelops
  †Camelops
- Canis
  - †Canis dirus
  - †Canis latrans
- Cnemidophorus
  - †Cnemidophorus sexlineatus
- Crotalus
  - †Crotalus horridus
- Dasypus
  - †Dasypus bellus
- Elaphe
  - †Elaphe vulpina
- Equus
  - †Equus complicatus
- Geomys
- Lepus
  - †Lepus americanus
- †Mammut
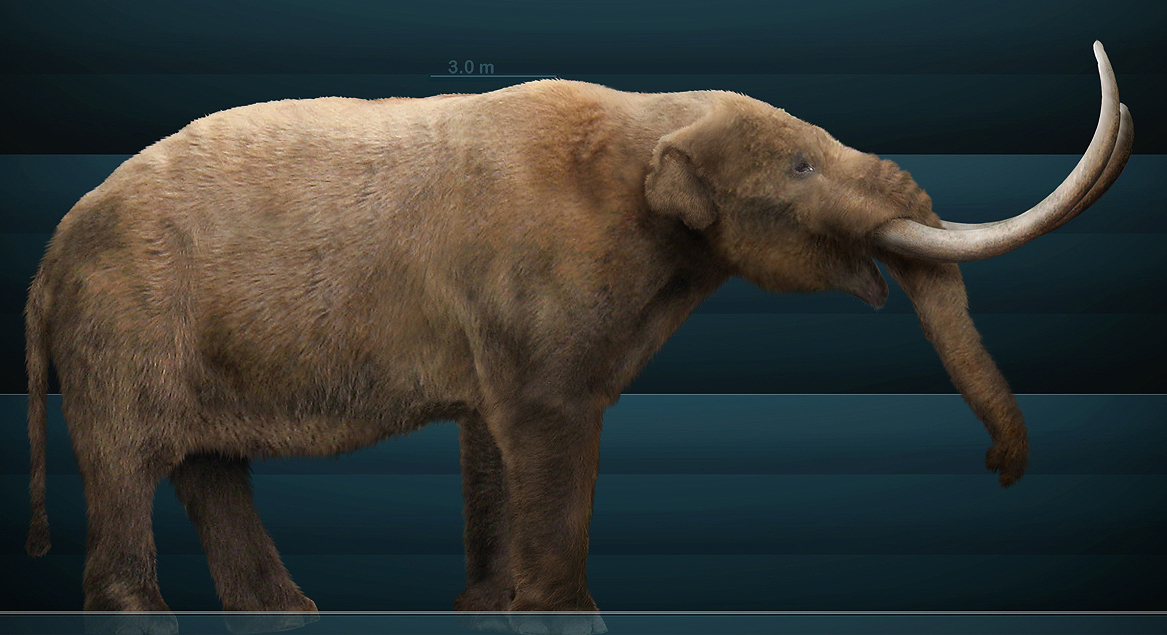
  - Restoration of a Mammut americanum, or American mastodon
    †Mammut americanum
- †Mammuthus
- Marmota
- †Megalonyx
  - †Megalonyx jeffersonii – or unidentified comparable form
- Microtus
  - †Microtus ochrogaster – or unidentified comparable form
  - †Microtus pennsylvanicus
- †Mylohyus
- Neotoma
  - †Neotoma floridana
- Nerodia
  - †Nerodia sipedon
- Ochrotomys
  - †Ochrotomys nuttalli – or unidentified comparable form
- Odocoileus
  - †Odocoileus virginianus
- Panthera
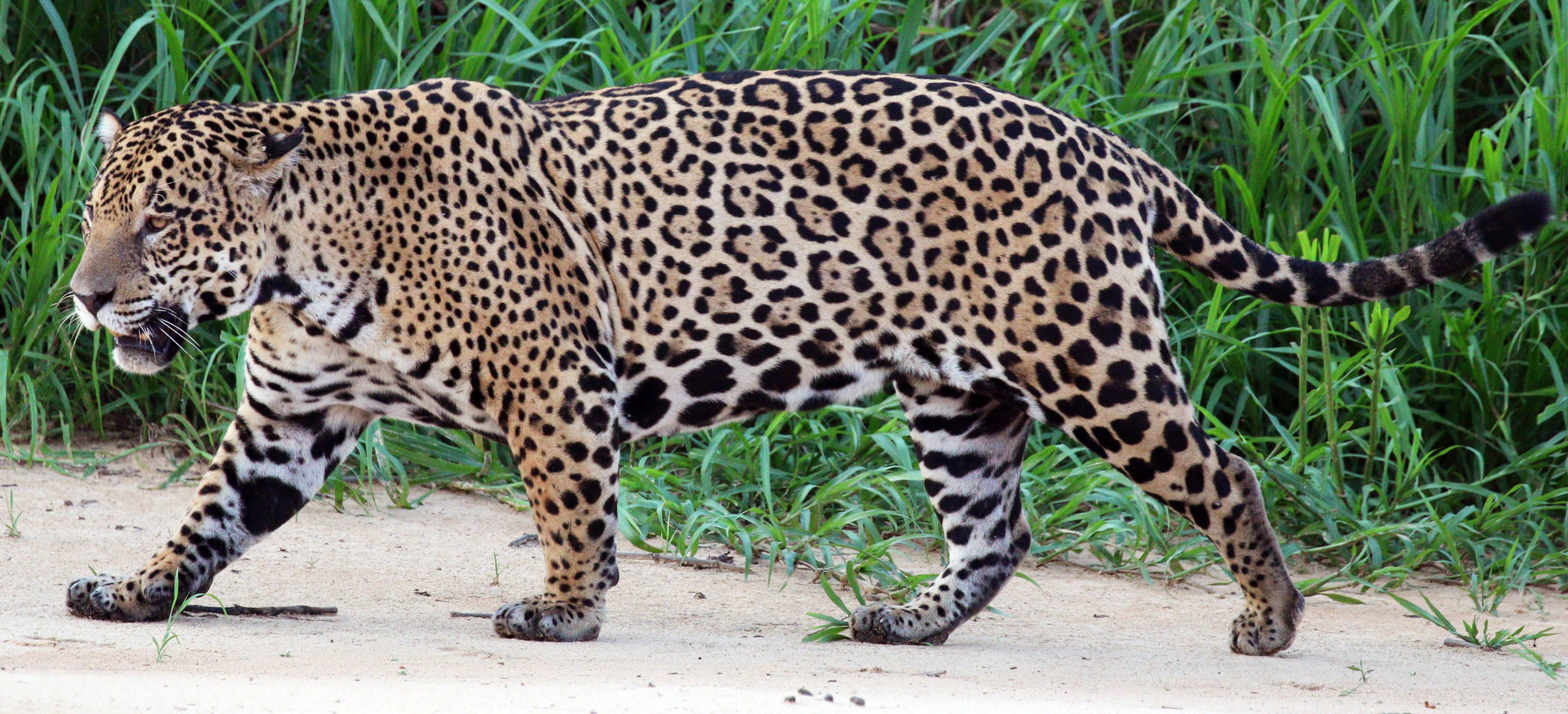
  - A living Panthera onca, or jaguar
    †Panthera onca
- †Platygonus
  - †Platygonus compressus
- Procyon
  - †Procyon lotor
- Puma
  - †Puma concolor – or unidentified comparable form
- †Rana
  - †Rana pipiens
- Sceloporus
  - †Sceloporus undulatus
- Sciurus
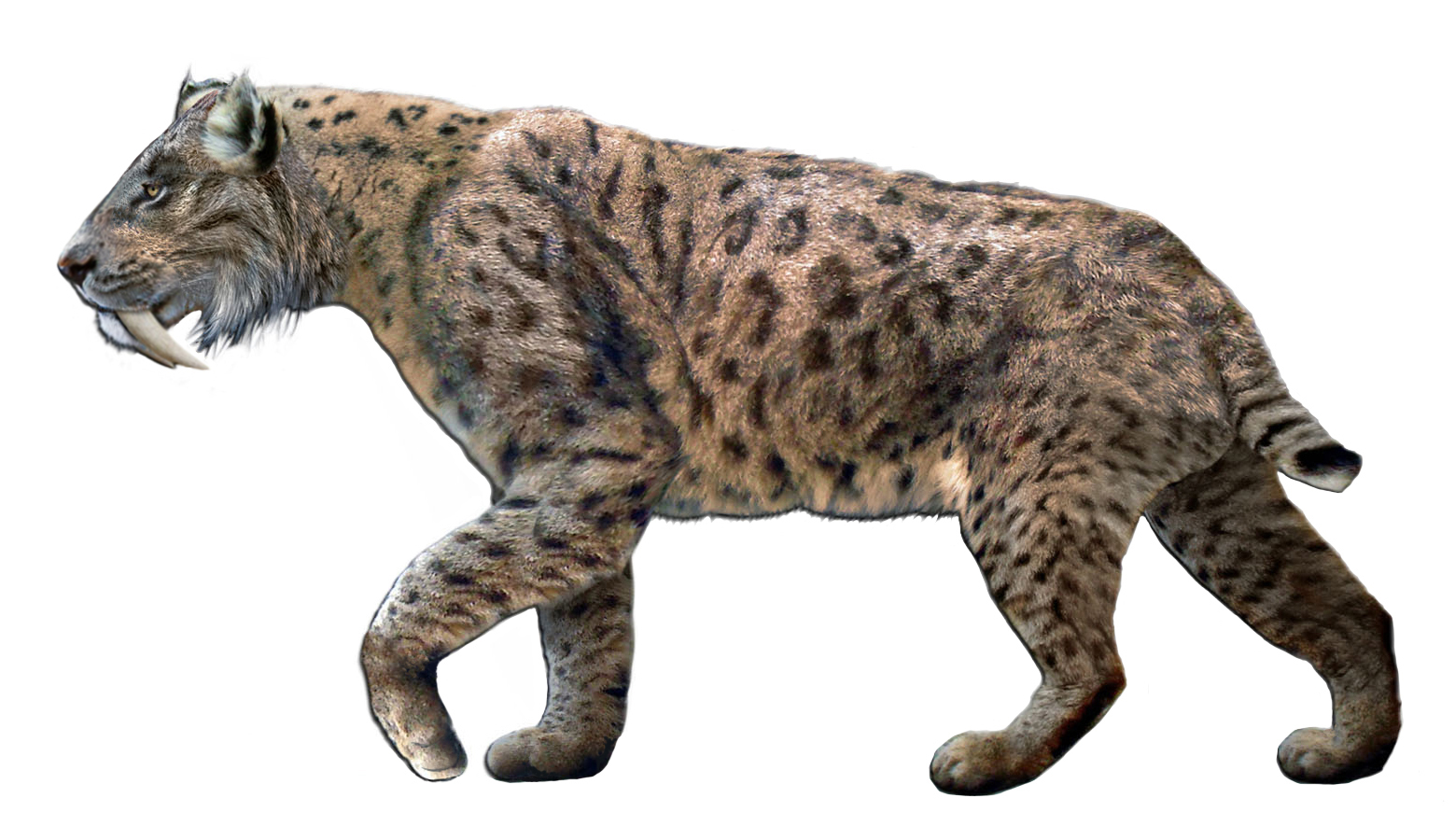
- Life restoration of the Pleistocene-Holocene saber-tooth cat Smilodon
  †Smilodon
- Spermophilus
- Spilogale
  - †Spilogale putorius – or unidentified comparable form
- Sylvilagus
  - †Sylvilagus aquaticus
- Synaptomys
  - †Synaptomys cooperi
- †Tanupolama
  - †Tanupolama parvus – type locality for species
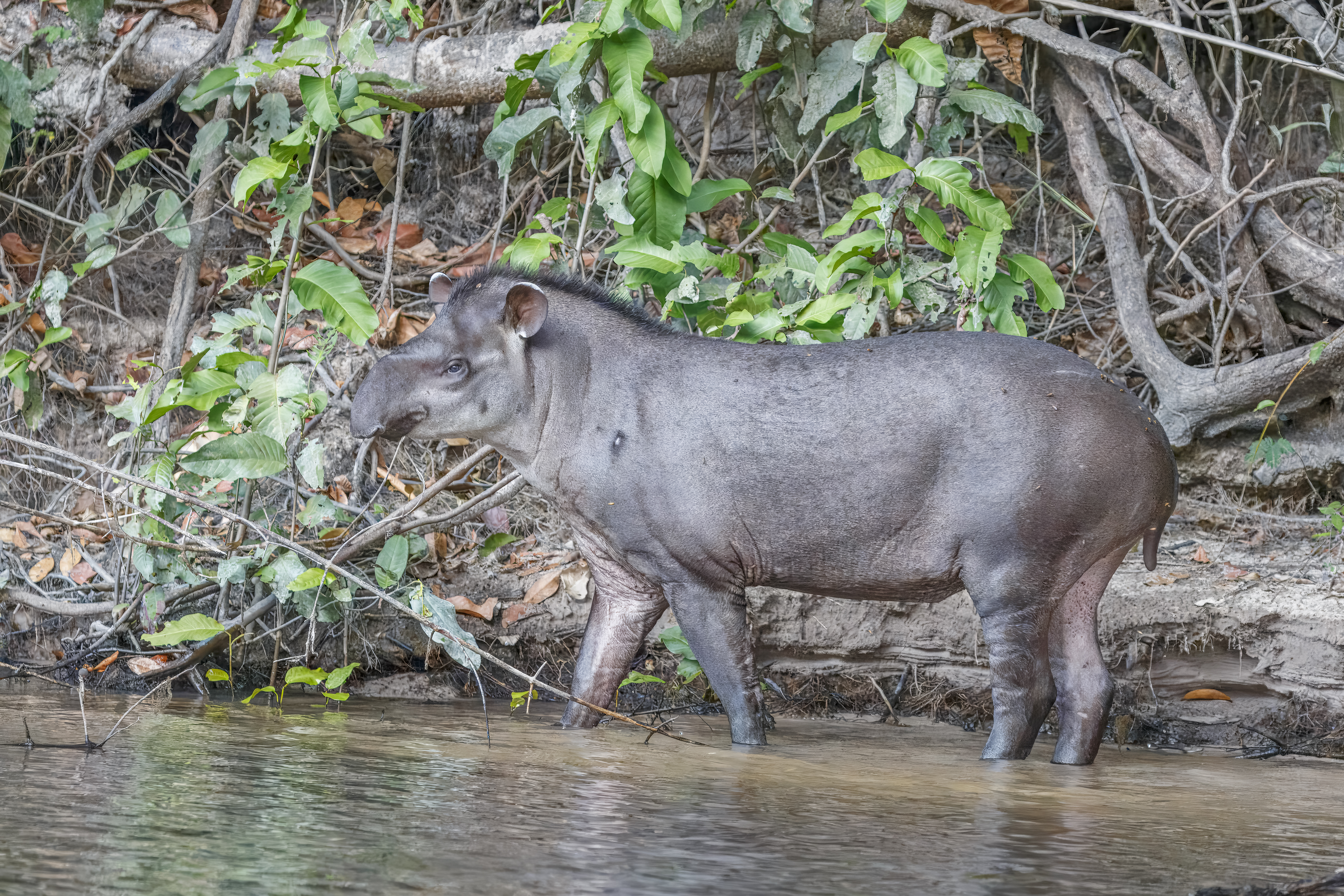
- A living Tapirus, or tapir
  Tapirus
- Urocyon
