= Robustum nodum =

Robustum nodum Temporal range: Ordovician

Scientific classification
- Domain: Eukaryota
- Kingdom: Animalia
- Phylum: Mollusca
- Class: Polyplacophora
- Order: †Paleoloricata
- Family: †Mattheviidae
- Genus: †Robustum
- Species: †R. nodum

Binomial name
- †Robustum nodum Stinchcomb and Darrough, 1995

Extinct species of mollusc

Robustum nodum is the one species of a problematic genus of Ordovician hemithecellid mollusc proposed by Stinchcomb and Darrough in 1995. Its similarities to Matthevia were outlined by Vendrasco & Runnegar.
