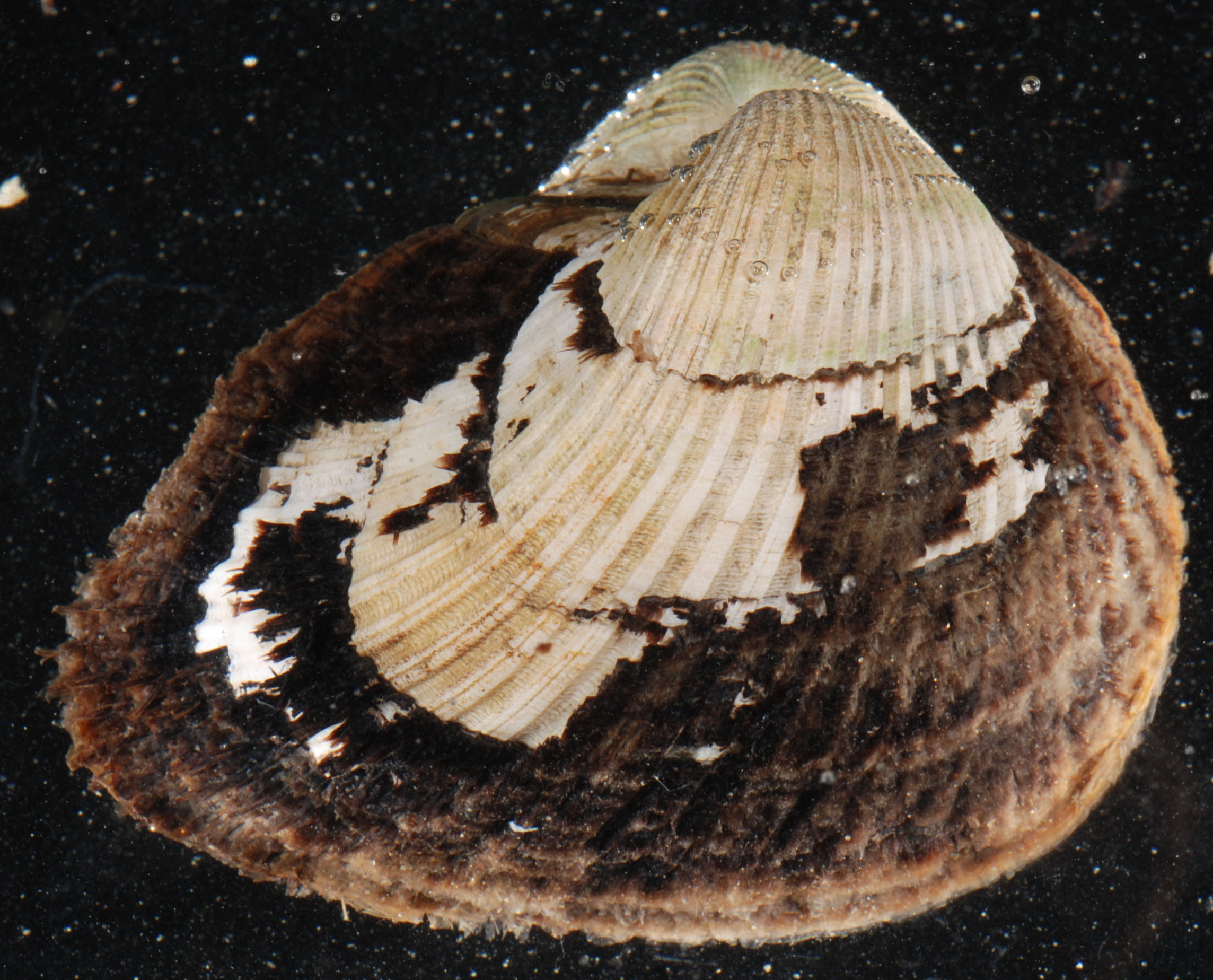

Conservation status
- Secure (NatureServe)

Scientific classification
- Kingdom: Animalia
- Phylum: Mollusca
- Class: Bivalvia
- Order: Arcida
- Family: Noetiidae
- Genus: Noetia
- Species: N. ponderosa

Binomial name
- Noetia ponderosa (Say, 1822)

= Noetia ponderosa =

Species of mollusc

Noetia ponderosa, or the ponderous ark clam, is a marine clam in the family Noetiidae.

== Description ==
The shape of the shell is rounded trigonal, almost as high as long, with 27-31 squared radial ribs divided by fine incised lines, and a distinctive brown or black periostracum. The exterior and interior of the shell is a white color. Size approximately 50–60 mm.

Right and left valve of the same specimen:

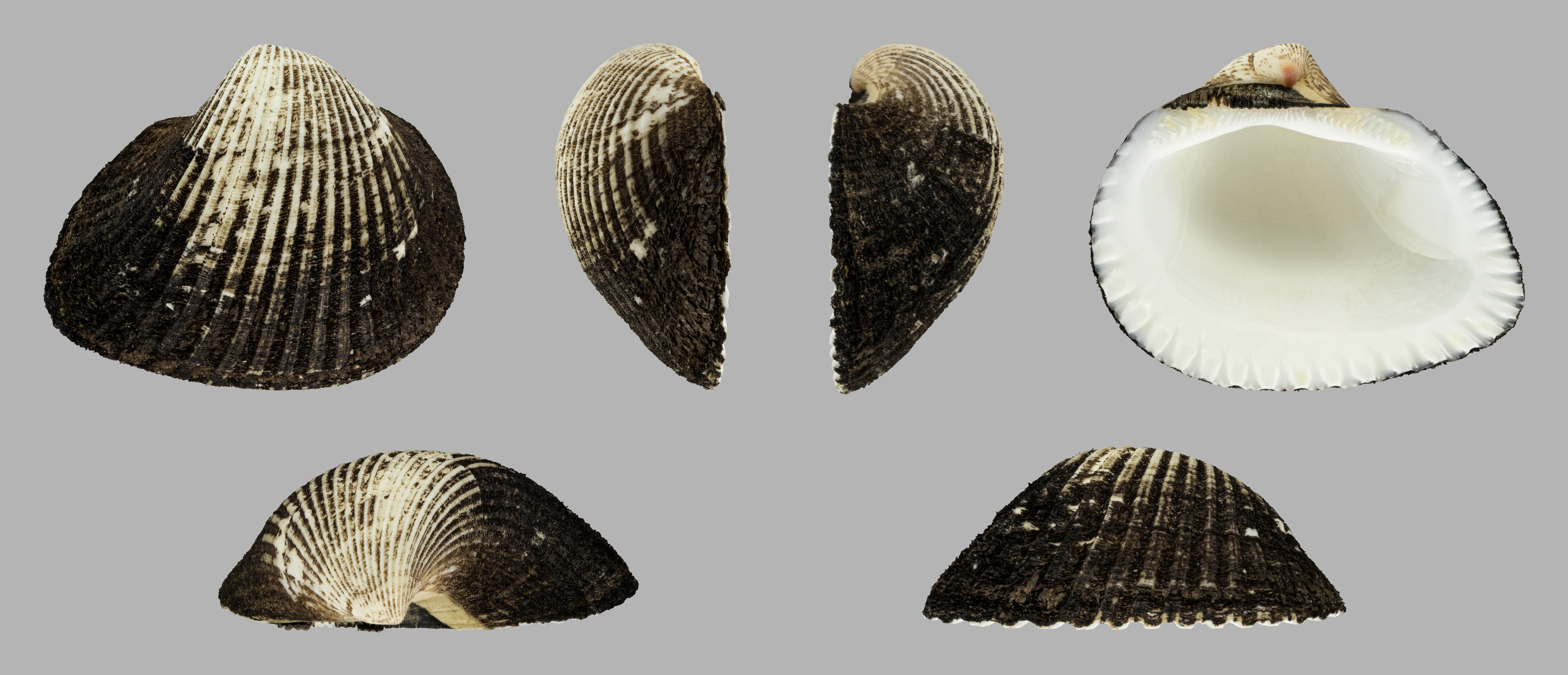
Right valve

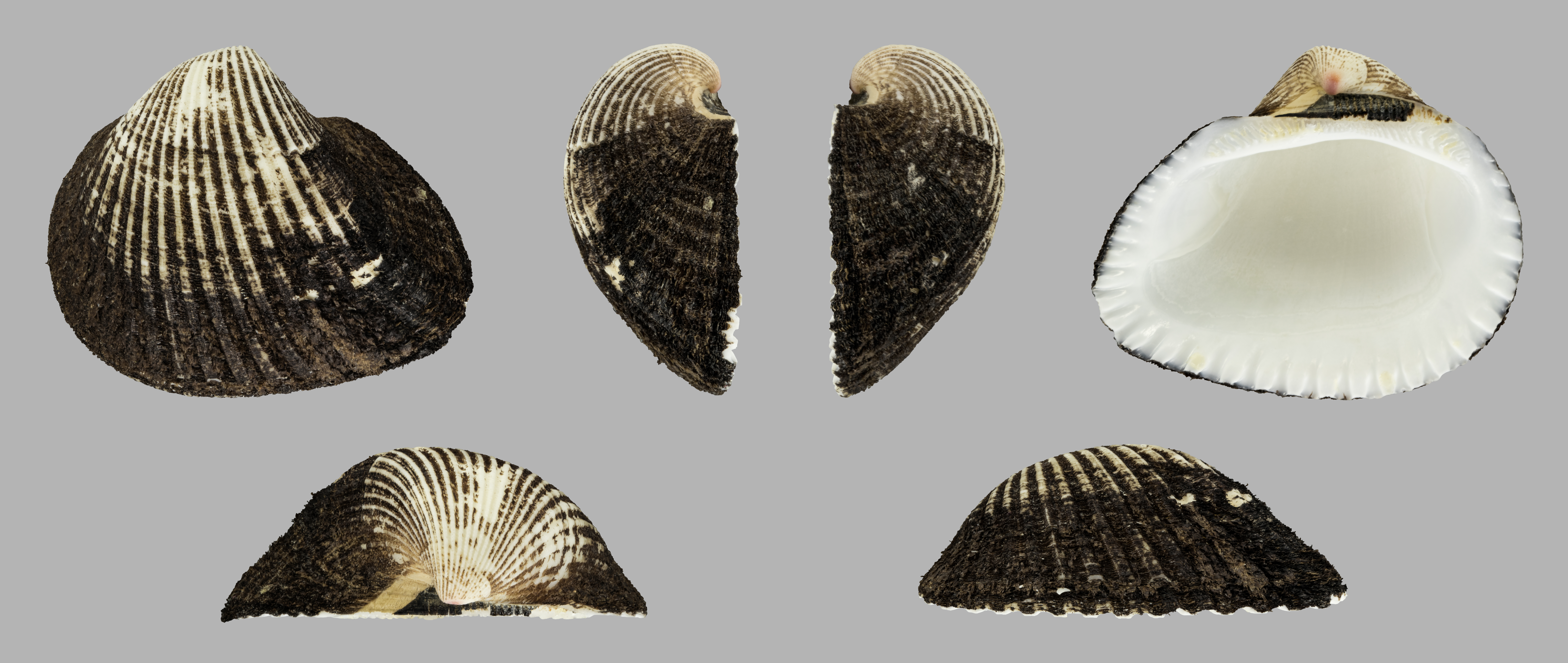
Left valve

== Distribution ==
Atlantic coast of North America, ranging from Virginia to Florida, West Indies, Gulf of Mexico, and Caribbean Central America.

== Habitat ==
Noetia ponderosa typically resides in shallow subtidal or tidal soft sandy substrates.
