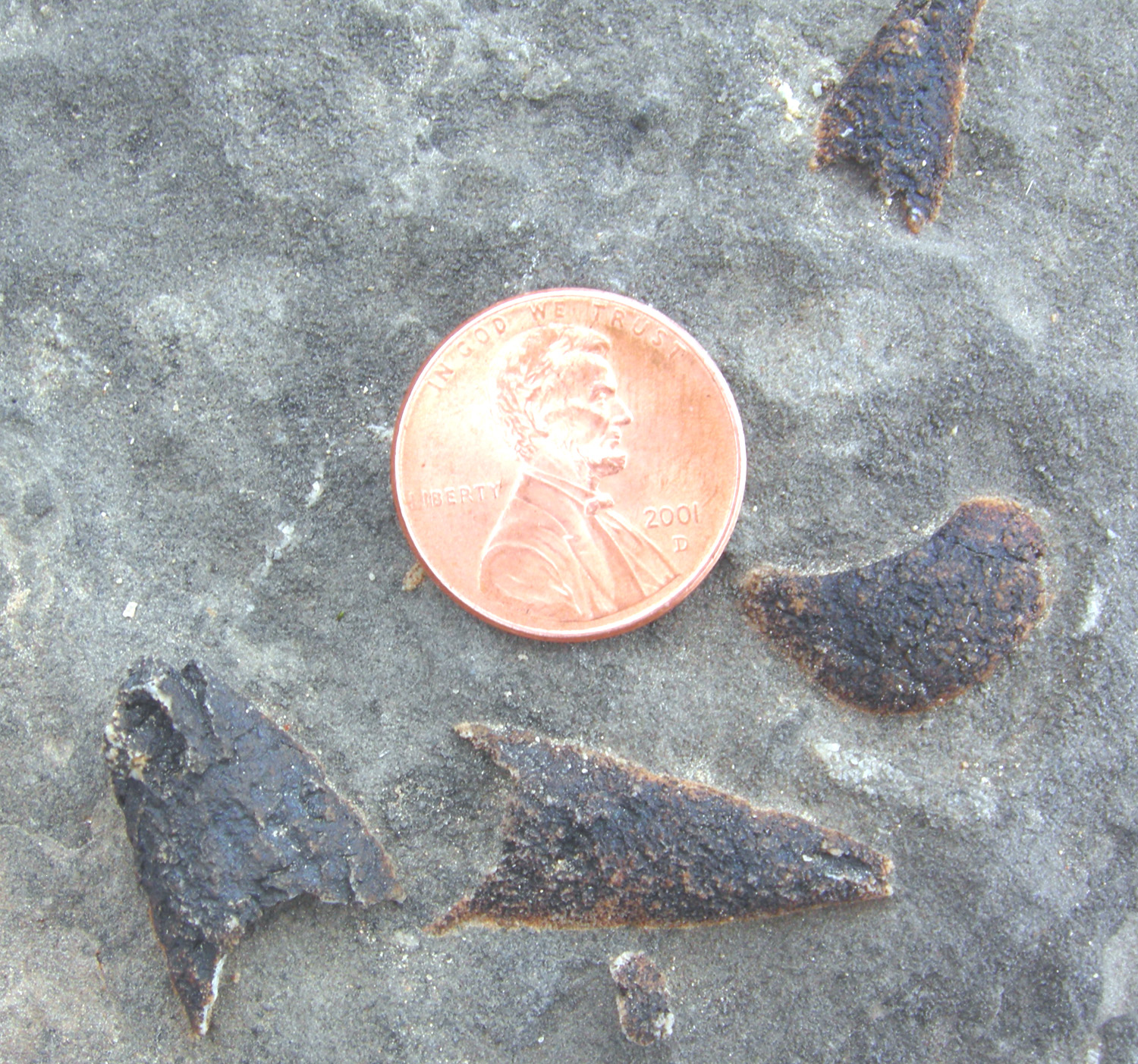
- Separate Matthevia plates compared to a coin with the diameter of 19 mm.

Scientific classification
- Kingdom: Animalia
- Phylum: Mollusca
- Class: †Mattheva(?) Polyplacophora(?)

= Mattheva =

Mattheva Temporal range: Cambrian

Extinct class of molluscs

Mattheva is a class of prehistoric mollusc from the late Cambrian, which might be better incorporated in a different class. It was erected to accommodate chiton-like organisms such as Matthevia. Although questionable, phosphatic fossils have been included in this class, even though molluscs do not use phosphate in their bodies.

== See also ==
- Chiton - Otherwise known as Polyplacophora, a minor mention of Mattheva in section 9
- Matthevia
