= Qaleruaqia =

Qaleruaqia Temporal range: Cambrian Stage 4

Scientific classification
- Kingdom: Animalia
- Phylum: Mollusca
- Class: Polyplacophora
- Order: †Paleoloricata
- Family: †Mattheviidae
- Genus: †Qaleruaqia
- Species: †Q. sodermanorum

Binomial name
- †Qaleruaqia sodermanorum Peel, 2020

Extinct genus of invertebrates

Qaleruaqia, known only from the Aftenstjernesø Formation, Lauge Koch Land, North Greenland is considered the earliest fossil aculiferan. The type species, Q. sodermanorum, was named and described in 2020.
