= Dycheiidae =

Scientific classification
- Domain: Eukaryota
- Kingdom: Animalia
- Phylum: Mollusca
- Class: Polyplacophora (?)
- Family: Dycheiidae; Pojeta et al 2010

Genera
- Dycheia Pojeta & Derby, 2007; Paradycheia Pojeta et al 2010

Family of molluscs

Dycheiidae is a wastebasket taxon containing problematic polyplacophora from Upper Cambrian strata in the USA.
