= Chelodes =

Chelodes Temporal range: Ordovician–Silurian

Scientific classification
- Domain: Eukaryota
- Kingdom: Animalia
- Phylum: Mollusca
- Class: Polyplacophora
- Order: †Paleoloricata
- Family: †Mattheviidae
- Genus: †Chelodes; Davidson & King, 1874

Species
- C. whitehousei; C. bergnianni Davidson & King; C. gotlandicus Lindstrom

Genus of molluscs

Chelodes is a genus of Palaeozoic molluscs made up of serially repeated monoplacophoran-like valves.

Synonyms: Eochelodes, Praecanthochiton Bergenhayn 1960, Preacanthochiton Bergenhayn 1960
