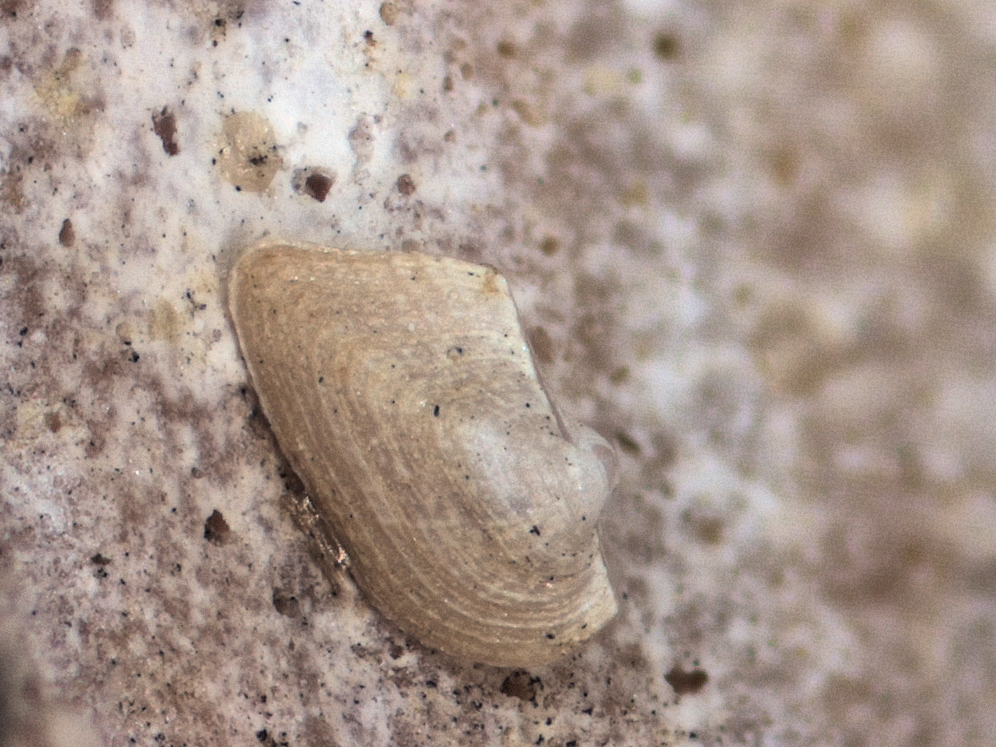
- Striarca lactea

Scientific classification
- Domain: Eukaryota
- Kingdom: Animalia
- Phylum: Mollusca
- Class: Bivalvia
- Order: Arcida
- Family: Noetiidae
- Genus: Striarca; Conrad, 1862

Type species
- Arca centenaria Say, 1824

Synonyms
- Gabinarca Iredale, 1939; Galactella Cossmann & Peyrot, 1912

= Striarca =

Genus of bivalves

Striarca is a genus of bivalves belonging to the family Noetiidae.

The genus has cosmopolitan distribution.

Species:

- †Striarca africana Newton, 1922
- † Striarca angulata (Scott 1970)
- Striarca centenaria (Say, 1824)
- † Striarca compressa Martin, 1883
- † Striarca cossmanni Laubriere, 1887
- † Striarca decipiens (G.P. Deshayes, 1858)
- † Striarca dispar (G.P. Deshayes, 1858)
- Striarca erythraea (Issel, 1869)
- Striarca gaymardi (B.C.M. Payraudeau, 1826)
- Striarca lactea (Linnaeus, 1758)
- † Striarca lamyi E.J. Koperberg, 1931
- † Striarca margaritula (G.P. Deshayes, 1858)
- Striarca miocaenica A.E.M. Cossmann & M.A. Peyrot, 1912
- Striarca navicella (Reeve, 1844)
- Striarca pisolina (Lamarck, 1819)
- † Striarca pretiosa (G.P. Deshayes, 1858)
- † Striarca saffordi (W.M. Gabb, 1860) (FOSSIL)
- Striarca symmetrica (Reeve, 1844)
- † Striarca umbonata Conrad, 1875
- Striarca zebuensis (Reeve, 1844)

Synonyms

- Striarca afra (Gmelin, 1791): synonym of Arcopsis afra (Gmelin, 1791)
- Striarca crinita R. Pulteney, 1799: synonym of Striarca lactea (C. Linnaeus, 1758)
- Striarca fausta Habe, 1951: synonym of Verilarca fausta (Habe, 1951)
- Striarca gaimardi B.C.M. Payraudeau, 1826: synonym of Striarca lactea (C. Linnaeus, 1758)
- Striarca gibba (Krauss, 1848): synonym of Striarca pisolina (Lamarck, 1819)
- Striarca interplicata (Grabau & S. G. King, 1928): synonym of Verilarca interplicata (Grabau & S. G. King, 1928)
- Striarca koshibensis K.M. Hatai & Nishiyama, 1952: synonym of Didimacar tenebrica (L.A. Reeve, 1844)
- Striarca lactanea S.V. Wood, 1840: synonym of Striarca lactea (C. Linnaeus, 1758)
- Striarca margarethae J.C. Melvill & R. Standen, 1907: synonym of Arcopsis sculptilis (L.A. Reeve, 1844)
- Striarca miocenica A.E.M. Cossmann & M.A. Peyrot, 1912: synonym of Striarca miocaenica A.E.M. Cossmann & M.A. Peyrot, 1912
- Striarca modiolus G.S. Poli, 1795: synonym of Striarca lactea (C. Linnaeus, 1758)
- Striarca oyamai Habe, 1953: synonym of Striarca symmetrica (Reeve, 1844)
- Striarca pennantiana W.E. Leach in J.E. Gray, 1852: synonym of Striarca lactea (C. Linnaeus, 1758)
- Striarca perforans W. Turton, 1819: synonym of Striarca lactea (C. Linnaeus, 1758)
- † Striarca perryi Le Renard, 1994: synonym of † Arcopsis perryi (Le Renard, 1994) (superseded combination)
- Striarca quoyi B.C.M. Payraudeau, 1826: synonym of Striarca lactea (C. Linnaeus, 1758)
- Striarca repenta T. Iredale, 1939: synonym of Didimacar tenebrica (L.A. Reeve, 1844)
- Striarca rosea G.D. Nardo, 1847: synonym of Striarca lactea (C. Linnaeus, 1758)
- † Striarca songliaoensis Z.-W. Gu & J.-S. Yu, 1976: synonym of † Ensidens songliaoensis (Z.-W. Gu & J.-S. Yu, 1976) (superseded combination)
- Striarca soyoae Habe, 1958: synonym of Calloarca soyoae (Habe, 1958)
- Striarca striata L.A. Reeve, 1844: synonym of Striarca lactea (C. Linnaeus, 1758)
- Striarca striatella P. Nyst, 1848: synonym of Striarca lactea (C. Linnaeus, 1758)
- Striarca tenebrica (Reeve, 1844): synonym of Didimacar tenebrica (Reeve, 1844)
- Striarca thielei Schenck & Reinhart, 1938: synonym of Verilarca thielei (Schenck & Reinhart, 1938)
