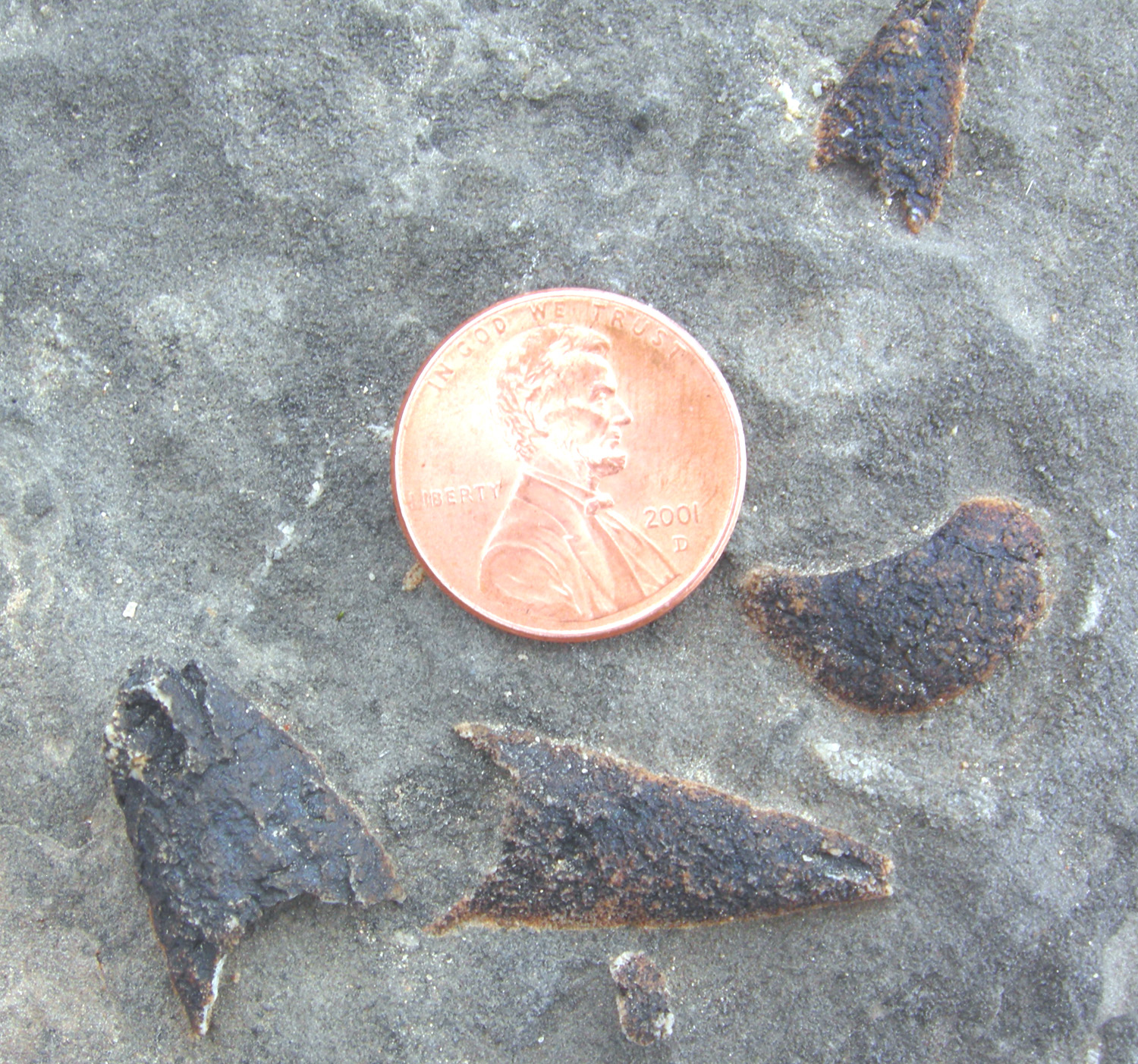
- Plates of Matthevia. Coin: 19 mm diameter

Scientific classification
- Domain: Eukaryota
- Kingdom: Animalia
- Phylum: Mollusca
- Class: Polyplacophora
- Order: †Paleoloricata
- Family: †Mattheviidae; Walcott, 1885

Genera
- Matthevia Walcott, 1885 (type); Chelodes Davidson & King, 1874; Hemithecella Ulrich & Bridge, 1941; Qaleruaqia Peel, 2020

= Mattheviidae =

Mattheviidae Temporal range: Cambrian Stage 4–Silurian

Extinct family of molluscs

Mattheviidae is an extinct taxonomic family of fossil chitons, marine polyplacophoran mollusks that are found in Cambrian-Silurian deposits.
