= Oncagnostus =

Scientific classification
- Domain: Eukaryota
- Kingdom: Animalia
- Phylum: Arthropoda
- Class: †Trilobita (?)
- Order: †Agnostida
- Family: †Agnostidae
- Genus: †Oncagnostus; Whitehouse, 1936

Genus of trilobite in the order Agnostida

Oncagnostus is a genus of trilobite in the order Agnostida, which existed in what is now Shandong, China. It was described by Whitehouse in 1936, and the type species is Oncagnostus hoi, which was originally described as a species of Agnostus by Sun in 1924.
