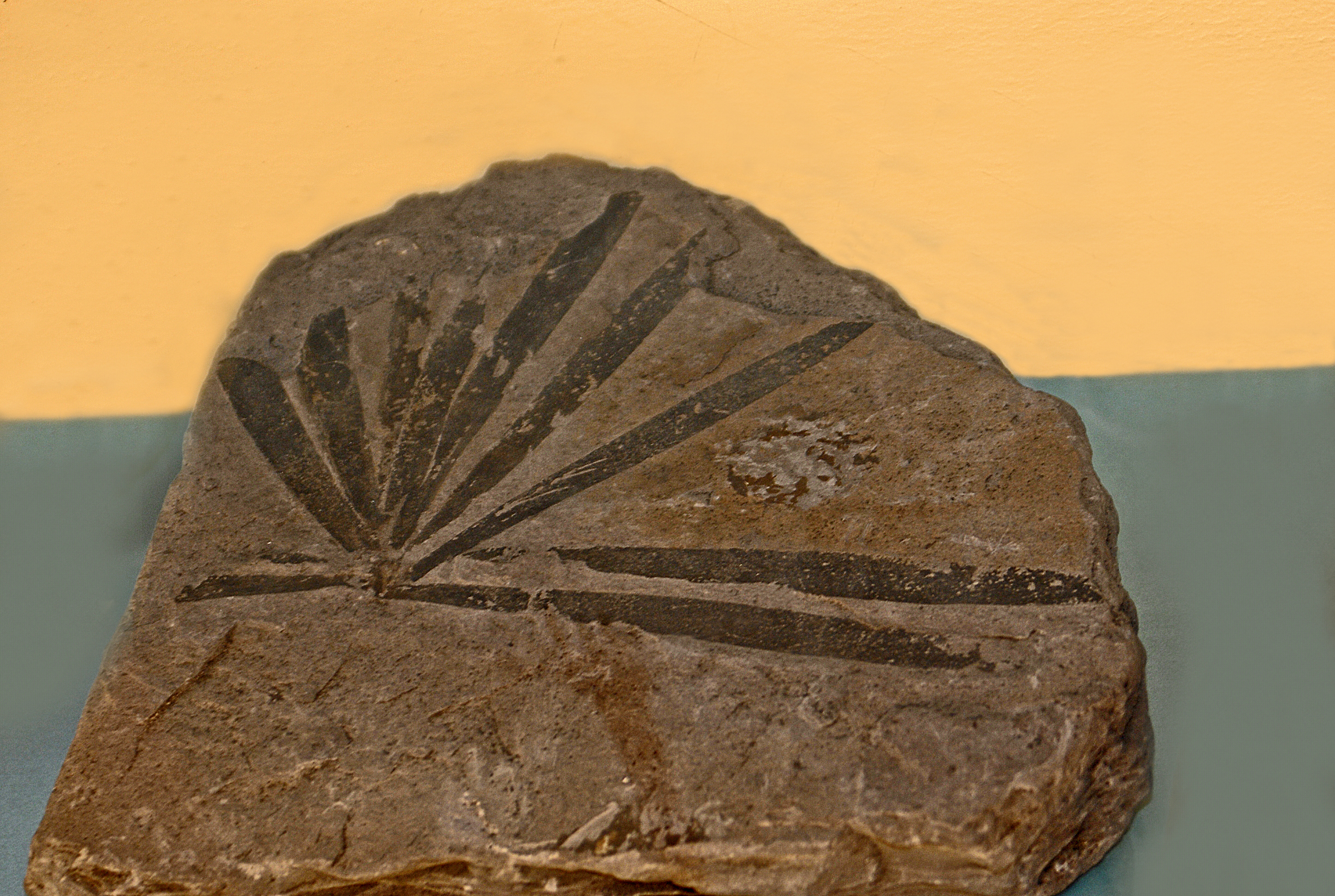
- Fossil leaves of Dorycordaites affinis on display at Galerie de paléontologie et d'anatomie comparée

Scientific classification
- Kingdom: Plantae
- Clade: Tracheophytes
- Clade: Gymnospermae
- Division: Pinophyta
- Class: Pinopsida
- Order: †Cordaitales
- Family: †Cordaitaceae
- Genus: †Dorycordaites; R. Zeiller, 1888

= Dorycordaites =

Dorycordaites Temporal range: from Carboniferous Desmoinesian age to Permian, 313.8–290.1 Ma

Genus of conifers

Dorycordaites is a genus of extinct gymnosperms.

== Distribution ==
Fossils of this genus have been found in Permian of Egypt, France, Morocco, Niger, Spain and in Desmoinesian of United States.
