= Paradycheia =

Scientific classification
- Kingdom: Animalia
- Phylum: Mollusca
- Class: Polyplacophora (?)
- Family: Dycheiidae
- Genus: Paradycheia; Pojeta et al, 2010
- Species: P. dorisae

Binomial name
- Paradycheia dorisae Pojeta et al, 2010

Extinct genus of molluscs

Paradycheia is a genus of polyplacophoran known from the Upper Cambrian Eminence Dolomite, Missouri, USA.
