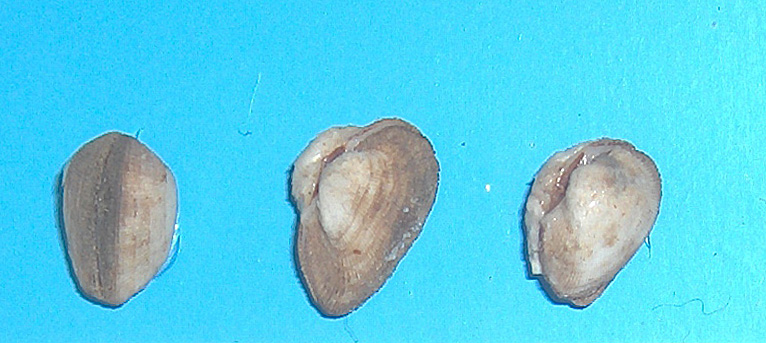
- Three shells of Striarca lactea

Scientific classification
- Kingdom: Animalia
- Phylum: Mollusca
- Class: Bivalvia
- Order: Arcida
- Superfamily: Arcoidea
- Family: Noetiidae; Stewart, 1930

Genera
- See text

= Noetiidae =

Family of bivalves

Noetiidae is a family of saltwater clams, marine bivalve molluscs in the order Arcida. They are related to the ark clams and used to be classified as among them. They are differentiated from the ark clams by the presence of striations on the hinge ligament and on the placement of this ligament. Like the ark clams, however, their shells range from ovate to elongate, are inflated, and are brown and white with clear radial ribs. They usually grow to around 6 cm in length, with a maximum of 10 cm.

== Genera and species ==
Genera and species within the family Noetidae include:

- Arcopsis Koenen, 1885
  - Arcopsis adamsi (Dall, 1886)
  - Arcopsis fossularca
  - Arcopsis gabinarca
  - Arcopsis mulinarca
  - Arcopsis ribriarca
  - Arcopsis scapularca
  - Arcopsis solida (Sowerby, 1833)
  - Arcopsis spinearca
  - Arcopsis verilarca
- Estellacar Iredale, 1939
- Noetia Gray, 1857
  - Noetia alssoni
  - Noetia bisulcata
  - Noetia delgada (Lowe, 1935)
  - Noetia lindae
  - Noetia ponderosa (Say, 1822)
  - Noetia reversa (Sowerby, 1833)
- Noetiella
  - Noetiella congoensis
- Rectangularca
- Scapularca
- Scelidionarca
- Sheldonella
  - Sheldonella barbatiella
  - Sheldonella didimacar
  - Sheldonella minutalis
  - Sheldonella paranoetia
- Stenocista
  - Stenocista gambiensis
- Striarca
  - Striarca afra
  - Striarca breviarca
  - Striarca estellacar
  - Striarca galactella
  - Striarca lactea
  - Striarca pectunculiformis
- Trigonodesma
- Trinacria
- Verilarca
  - Verilarca sinensis
