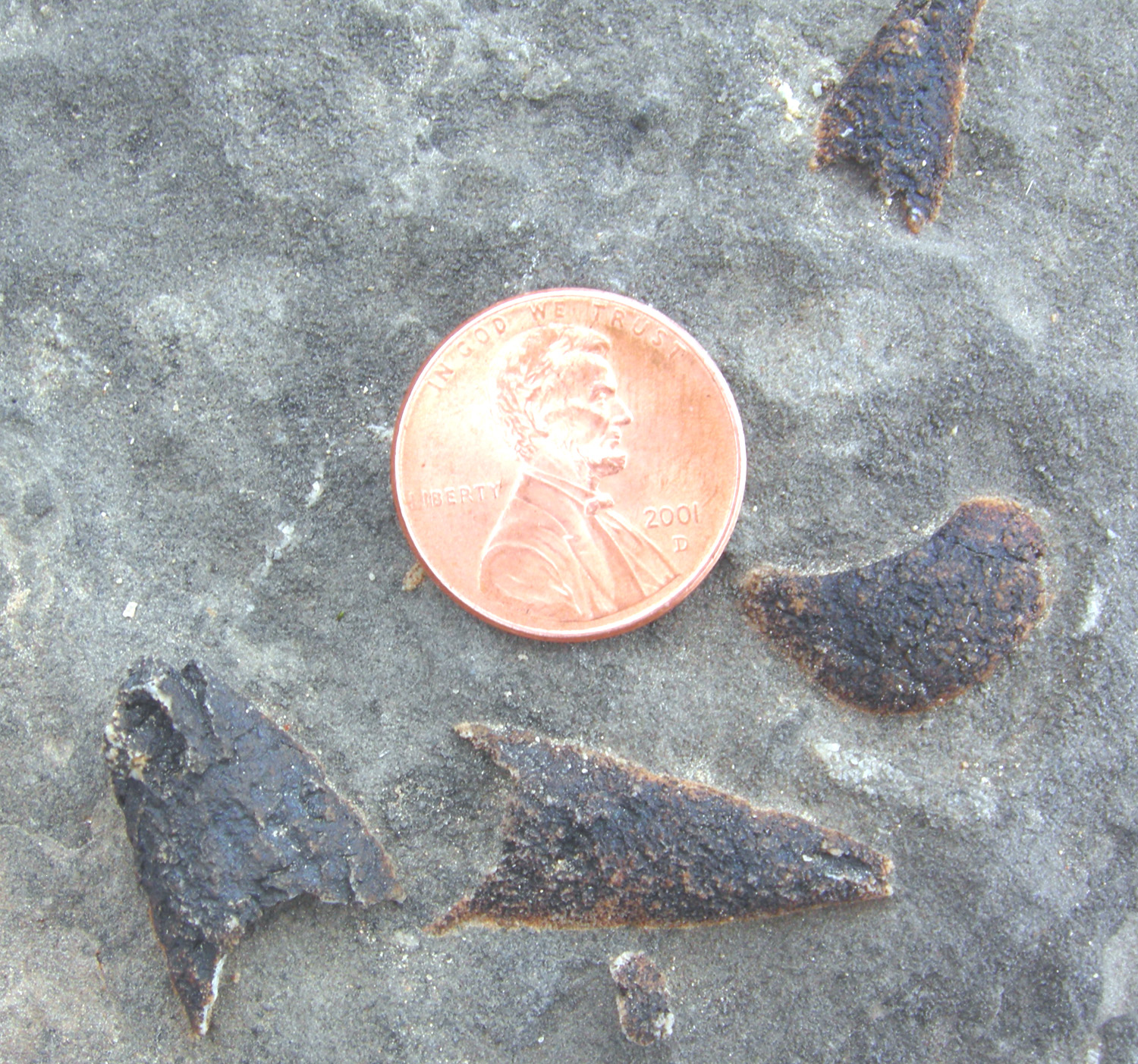
- Plates of Matthevia. Coin: 19 mm diameter

Scientific classification
- Domain: Eukaryota
- Kingdom: Animalia
- Phylum: Mollusca
- Class: Polyplacophora
- Order: †Paleoloricata
- Family: †Mattheviidae
- Genus: †Matthevia; Walcott, 1885

= Matthevia =

Matthevia Temporal range: Late Cambrian–Lower Ordovician

Extinct genus of molluscs

Matthevia is a genus of Cambrian molluscs, perhaps related to the chitons. It consists of repeated monoplacophoran-like shells; according to one hypothesis, chitons arose when these tall shells began to overlap over the generations. The tall element of the shell was retained and forms the tips of modern chiton plates. There are distinct head, 'centre', and tail valves, which occur approximately in the ratio 1:5:1 — suggesting a seven-plated configuration.

Matthevia was first described by Charles D. Walcott in 1885.

== See also ==
- Mattheva
