= Hemithecella =

Hemithecella Temporal range: Ordovician

Scientific classification
- Domain: Eukaryota
- Kingdom: Animalia
- Phylum: Mollusca
- Class: Polyplacophora
- Order: †Paleoloricata
- Family: †Mattheviidae
- Genus: †Hemithecella

Extinct genus of molluscs

Hemithecella is a problematic genus of Ordovician mollusc proposed by Stinchcomb and Darrough in 1995. Hemithecella belongs to what are informally known as multiplated molluscs; it is found in the late Cambrian of the Ozarks and the Lower Ordovician of the same region as well as in Minnesota and the southern Appalachian Mountains. Hemithecella has muscle scars identical to a monoplacophoran and not the musculature of a chiton to which some authors have suggested the multiplated molluscs belong. It is therefore classified in the Mattheviidae.
