= List of the Paleozoic life of Kentucky =

This list of the Paleozoic life of Kentucky contains the various prehistoric life-forms whose fossilized remains have been reported from within the US state of Kentucky and are between 538.8 and 252.17 million years of age.

== A ==
- †Abatocrinus
  - †Abatocrinus grandis
  - †Abatocrinus steropes
  - †Abatocrinus n. sp. – informal
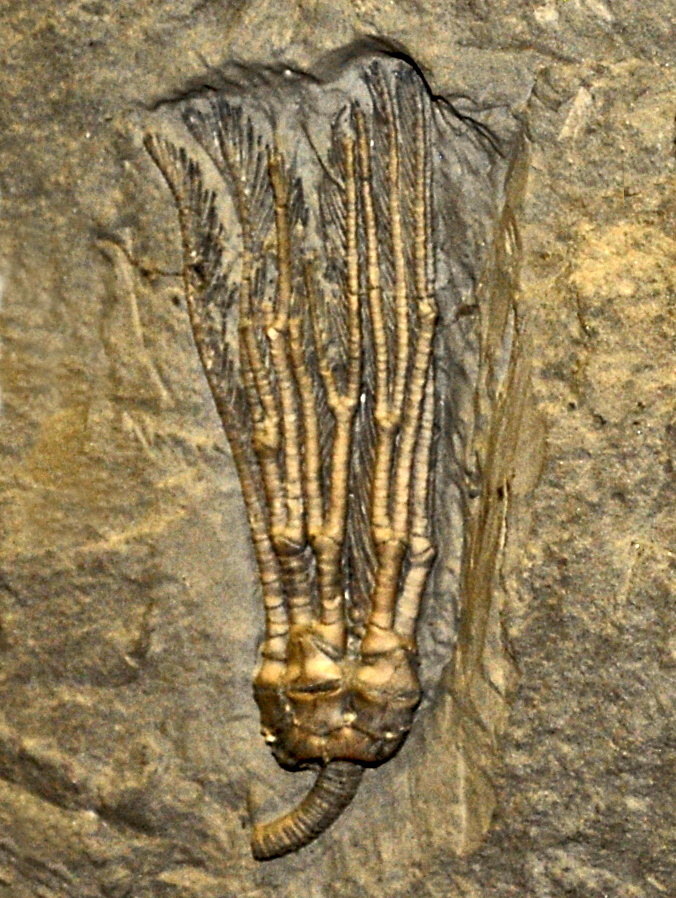
- Fossilized calyx of the Carboniferous crinoid ("sea lily") Abrotocrinus
  †Abrotocrinus
  - †Abrotocrinus coreyi
  - †Abrotocrinus debrae
  - †Abrotocrinus manus – tentative report
  - †Abrotocrinus springeri
  - †Abrotocrinus unicus
- †Achatella
- †Achistrum
  - †Achistrum brownwoodensis
  - †Achistrum ludwigi
  - †Achistrum monochordata
  - †Achistrum nicholsoni
- †Acidaspis
- †Acidaspsis
- †Acinophyllum
  - †Acinophyllum davisi
- †Aclisina
  - †Aclisina golconda
- †Acolocrinus
  - †Acolocrinus hydraulicus
- †Acratia
- † Acrophyllum
  - †Acrophyllum clarki
  - †Acrophyllum conigerum
- †Actinoceras
  - †Actinoceras altopontense – type locality for species
  - †Actinoceras kentuckiense – type locality for species
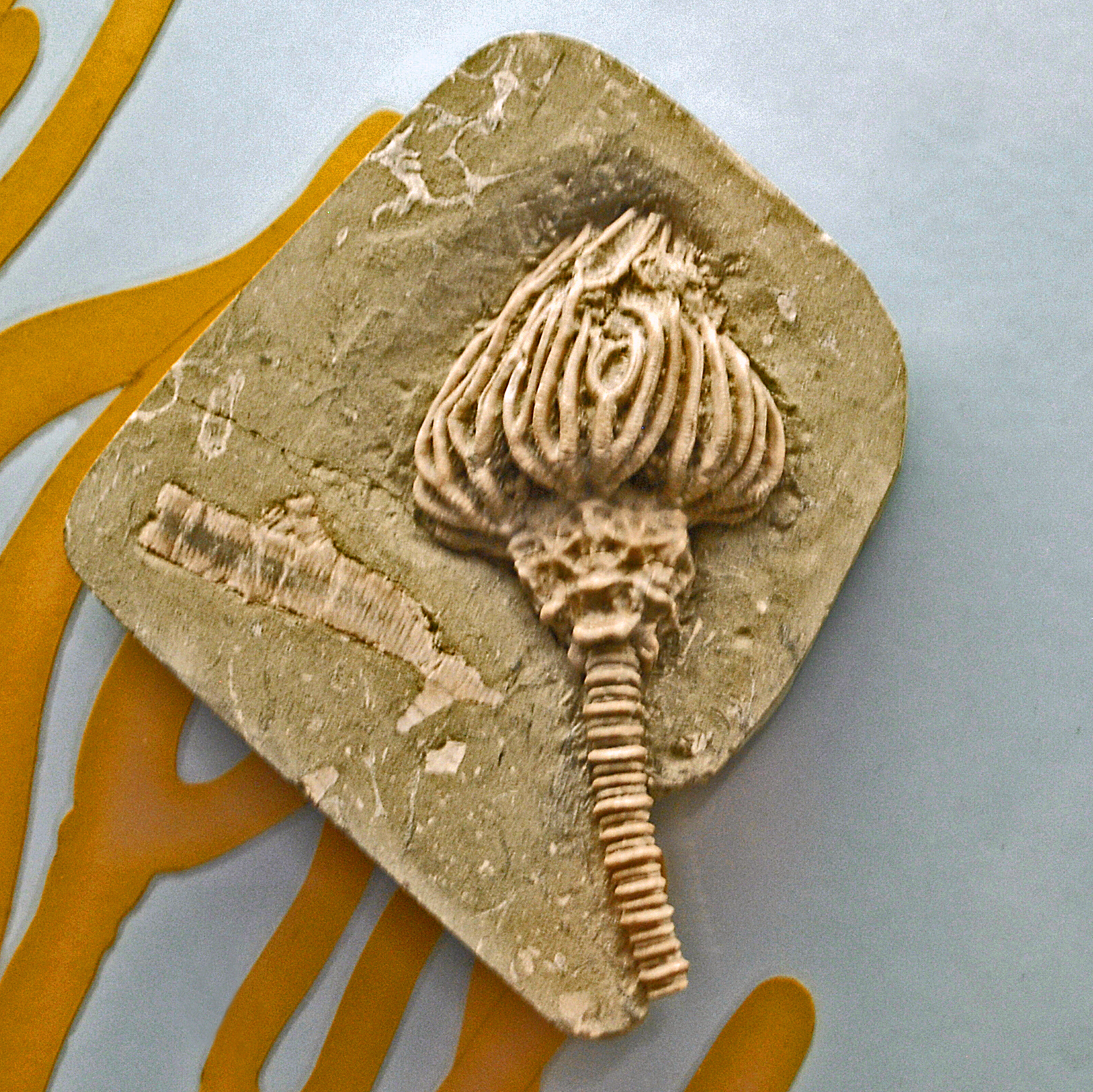
- Fossilized calyx and partial stem of the Devonian-Permian crinoid ("sea lily") Actinocrinites
  †Actinocrinites
  - †Actinocrinites eximius
  - †Actinocrinites gibsoni
  - †Actinocrinites jugosus
  - †Actinocrinites scitulus
- †Adinocrinus
  - †Adinocrinus nodosus
- †Aerocortex
  - †Aerocortex kentuckiensis
- †Agaricocrinus
  - †Agaricocrinus americanus
  - †Agaricocrinus crassus
  - †Agaricocrinus inflatus – tentative report
  - †Agaricocrinus planoconvexus
  - †Agaricocrinus wortheni – tentative report
- †Agassizocrinus
  - †Agassizocrinus conicus
  - †Agassizocrinus gibbosua
  - †Agassizocrinus laevis
  - †Agassizocrinus lobatus
- †Ahrensisporites
  - †Ahrensisporites guerickei
- †Alaskadiscus
  - †Alaskadiscus magnus
  - †Alaskadiscus subacutus
- †Alastega
  - †Alastega martini – type locality for species
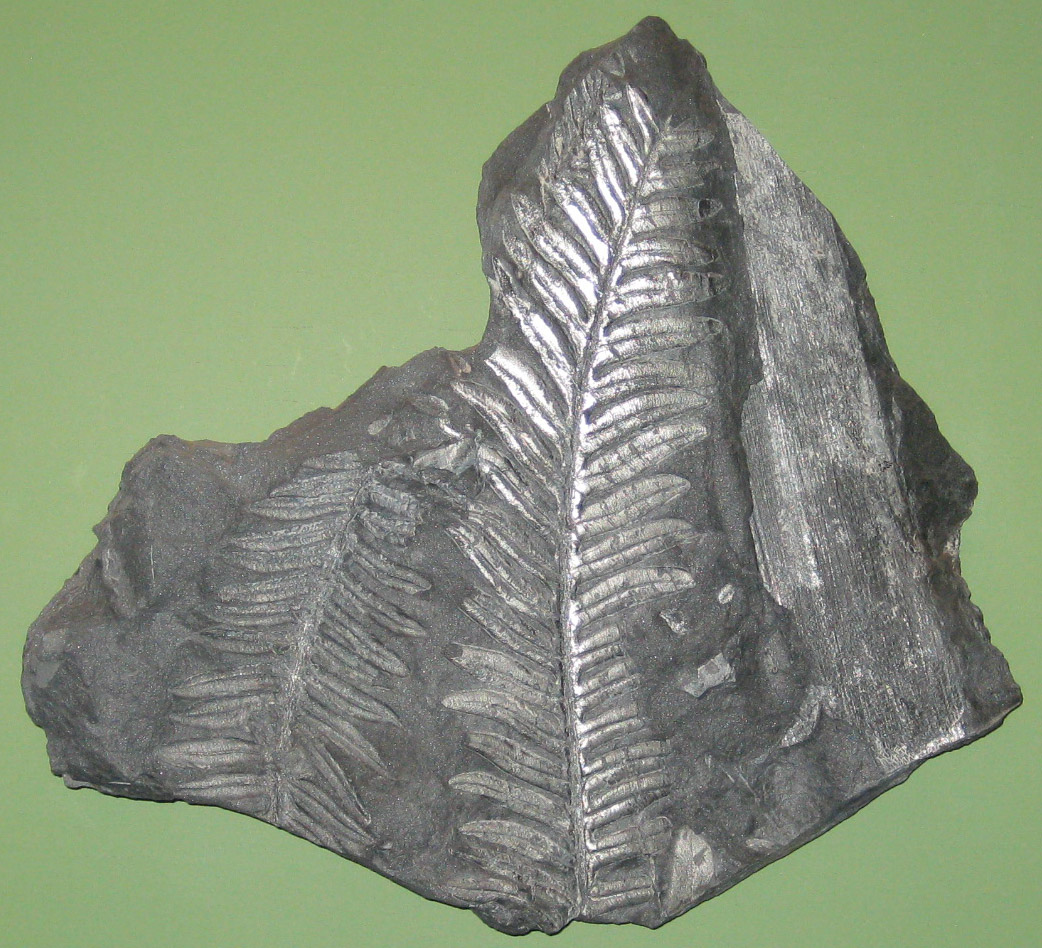
- Fossilized fronds of the Carboniferous-Early Cretaceous seed fern Alethopteris
  †Alethopteris
  - †Alethopteris decurrens
  - †Alethopteris lonchitica – or unidentified comparable form
- †Allonychia
  - †Allonychia flanaganensis
- †Alloprosallocrinus
  - †Alloprosallocrinus conicus
- †Allorisma
- †Allosaccus
- †Allumettoceras
  - †Allumettoceras tenerum – or unidentified comparable form
- †Alveolites
  - †Alveolites asperus
  - †Alveolites constans
  - †Alveolites expatiatus
  - †Alveolites fibrosus
  - †Alveolites goldfussi
  - †Alveolites labrosus
  - †Alveolites louisvillensis
  - †Alveolites minimus
  - †Alveolites mordax
  - †Alveolites squamosus
  - †Alveolites undosus
  - †Alveolites winchellana
- †Amaurotoma
  - †Amaurotoma leavenworthana
- †Amblytochiton
  - †Amblytochiton incomptus – type locality for species
- †Ambochia
- †Ambonychia
  - †Ambonychia byrnesi
  - †Ambonychia ulrichi – or unidentified comparable form
- †Ammonellipsites
- †Amphiscapha
  - †Amphiscapha catilloides
- †Amphissites
  - †Amphissites centronotoides
  - †Amphissites mimicus
  - †Amphissites planoventralis
  - †Amphissites vanniae
- †Amphoracrinus
- †Amplexizaphrentis
  - †Amplexizaphrentis compressus
  - †Amplexizaphrentis spinulosus
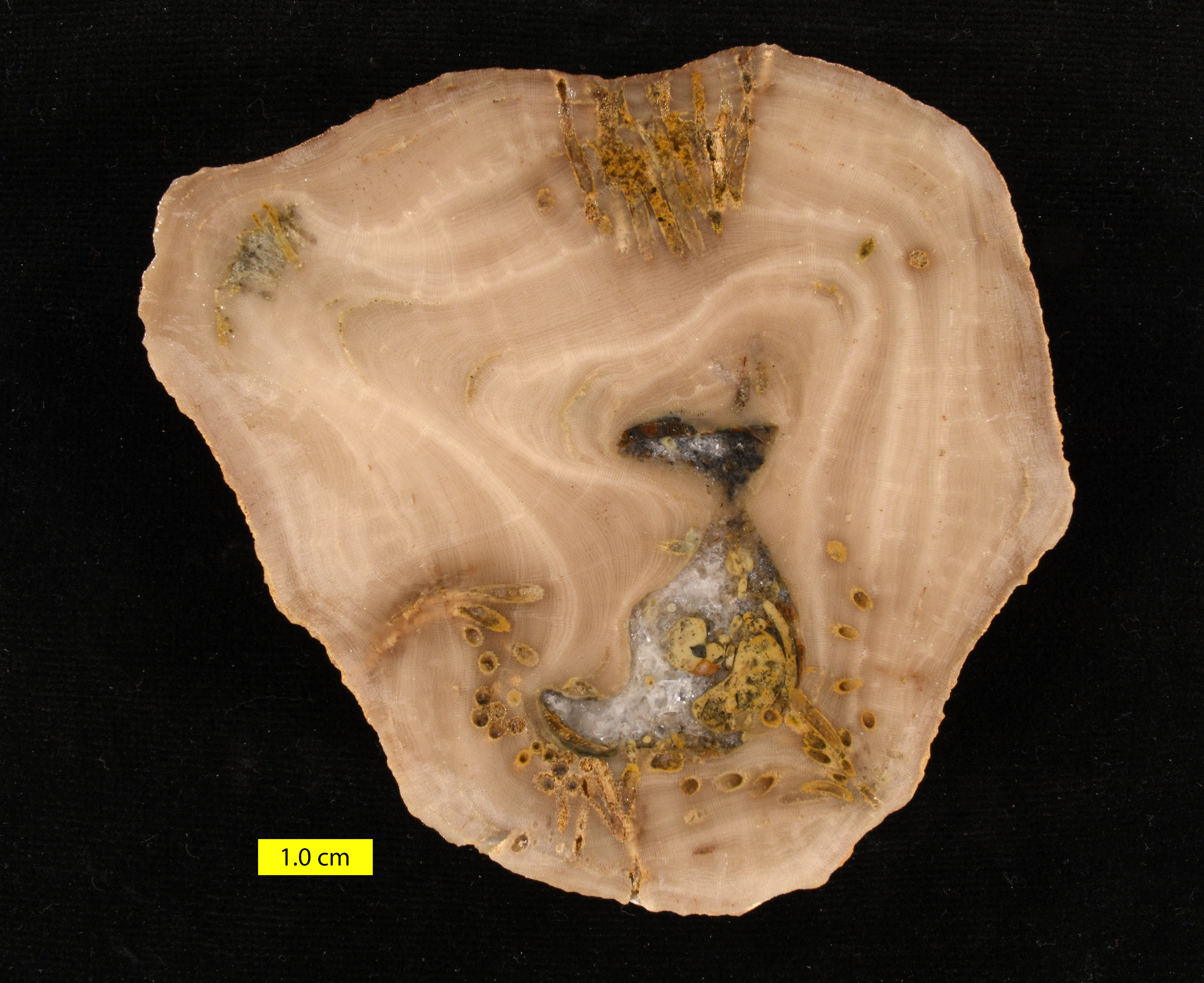
- Ordovician-Permian bryozoan Amplexopora
  †Amplexopora
  - †Amplexopora minnesotensis
  - †Amplexopora minor
  - †Amplexopora persimilis
  - †Amplexopora winchelli – or unidentified comparable form
- †Amplexus
  - †Amplexus fragilis
- †Amygdalocystites
  - †Amygdalocystites fiorealis
- †Anapiculatisporites
  - †Anapiculatisporites minor
- †Anastrophia – tentative report
- †Anazyga
  - †Anazyga recurvirostra
- †Anchiopella
  - †Anchiopella anchiops
- †Anematina
  - †Anematina proutana
- † Anisophyllum
  - †Anisophyllum trifurcatum
  - †Anisophyllum unilargum – tentative report
- †Ankyropteris
  - †Ankyropteris brongniartii
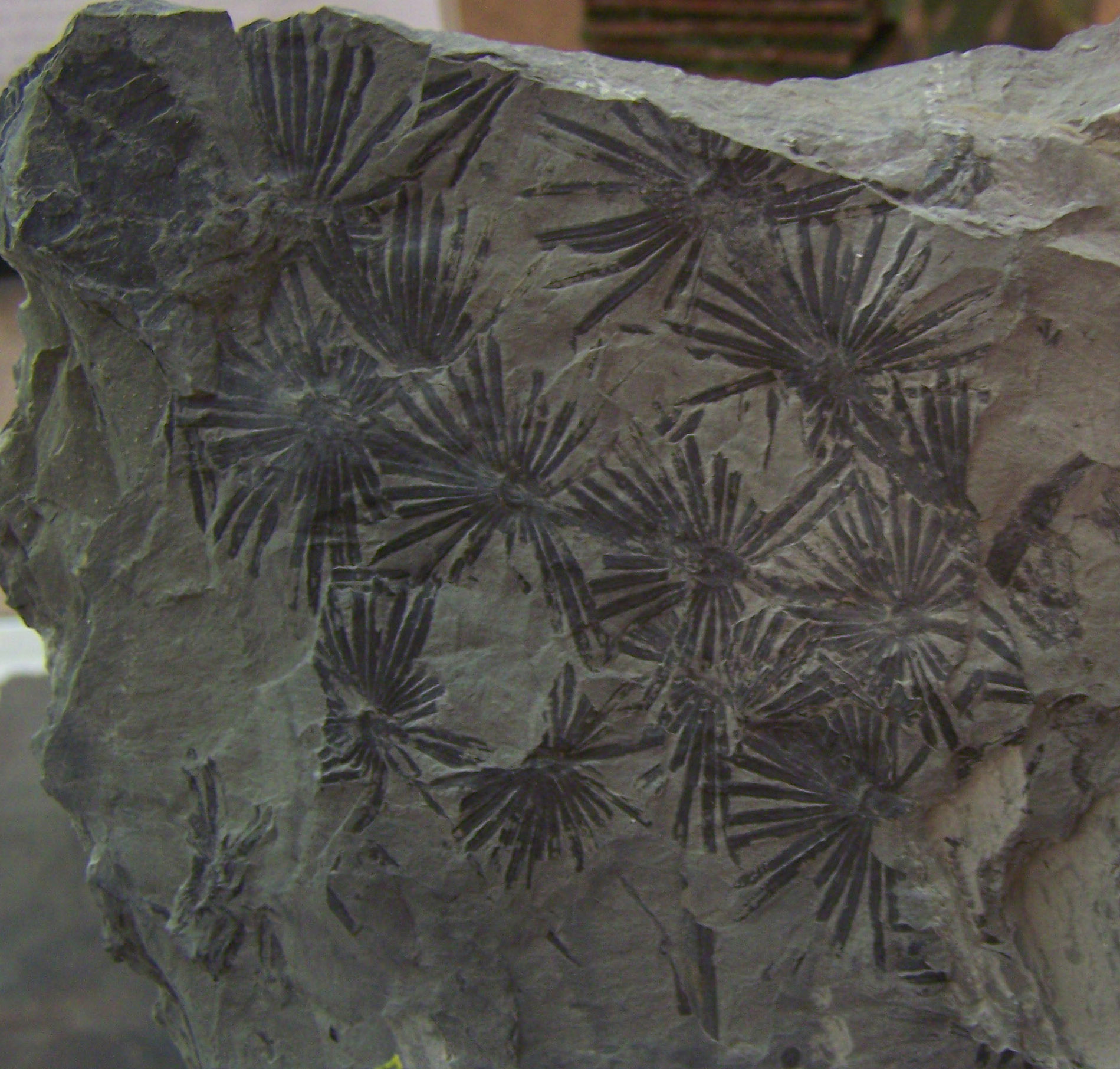
- Fossil of the Carboniferous horsetail relative Annularia
  †Annularia
  - †Annularia galioides
- †Anomalocrinus
- †Anomalodonta
  - †Anomalodonta gigantea
- †Aorocrinus
  - †Aorocrinus nodulus – type locality for species
- †Aparchites
  - †Aparchites minutissimus
- †Apiculatasporites
  - †Apiculatasporites variocorneus
- †Apodasmocrinus
  - †Apodasmocrinus punctatus
- †Aptochilina
- †Arabellites
  - †Arabellites cornutus
- †Arachnophyllum
  - †Arachnophyllum mamillare
  - †Arachnophyllum mammillare
  - †Arachnophyllum pentagonum – type locality for species
  - †Arachnophyllum quadrangulare
  - †Arachnophyllum separatum
  - †Arachnophyllum sinemurum – type locality for species
  - †Arachnophyllum striatum
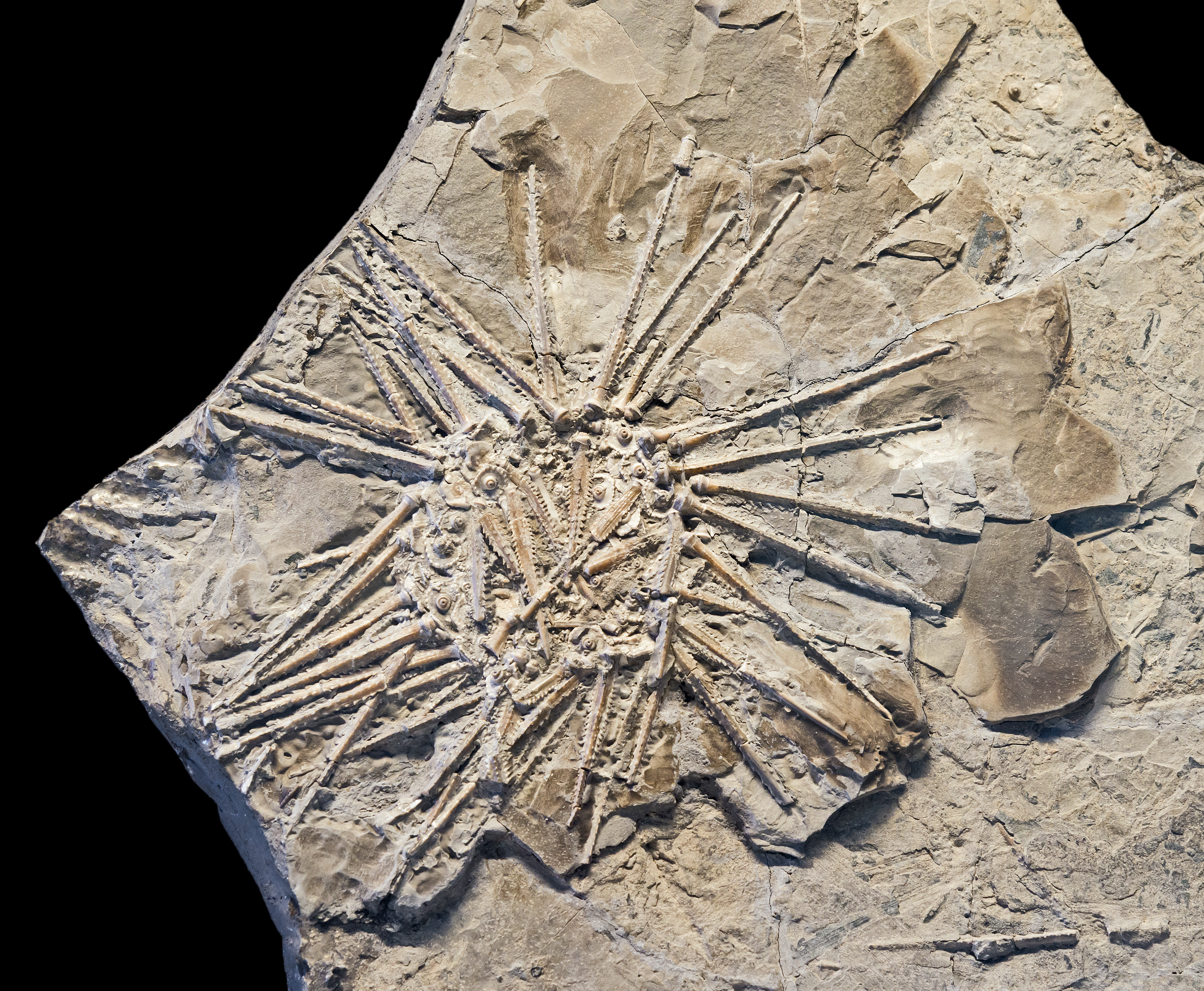
- Fossilized shell and spines of the Late Devonian-Permian sea urchin Archaeocidaris
  †Archaeocidaris
  - †Archaeocidaris norwoodi
- †Archaeocrinus
  - †Archaeocrinus peculiaris
- †Archaeopitys
  - †Archaeopitys eastmanii
- †Archaeopteris
  - †Archaeopteris eastmanii
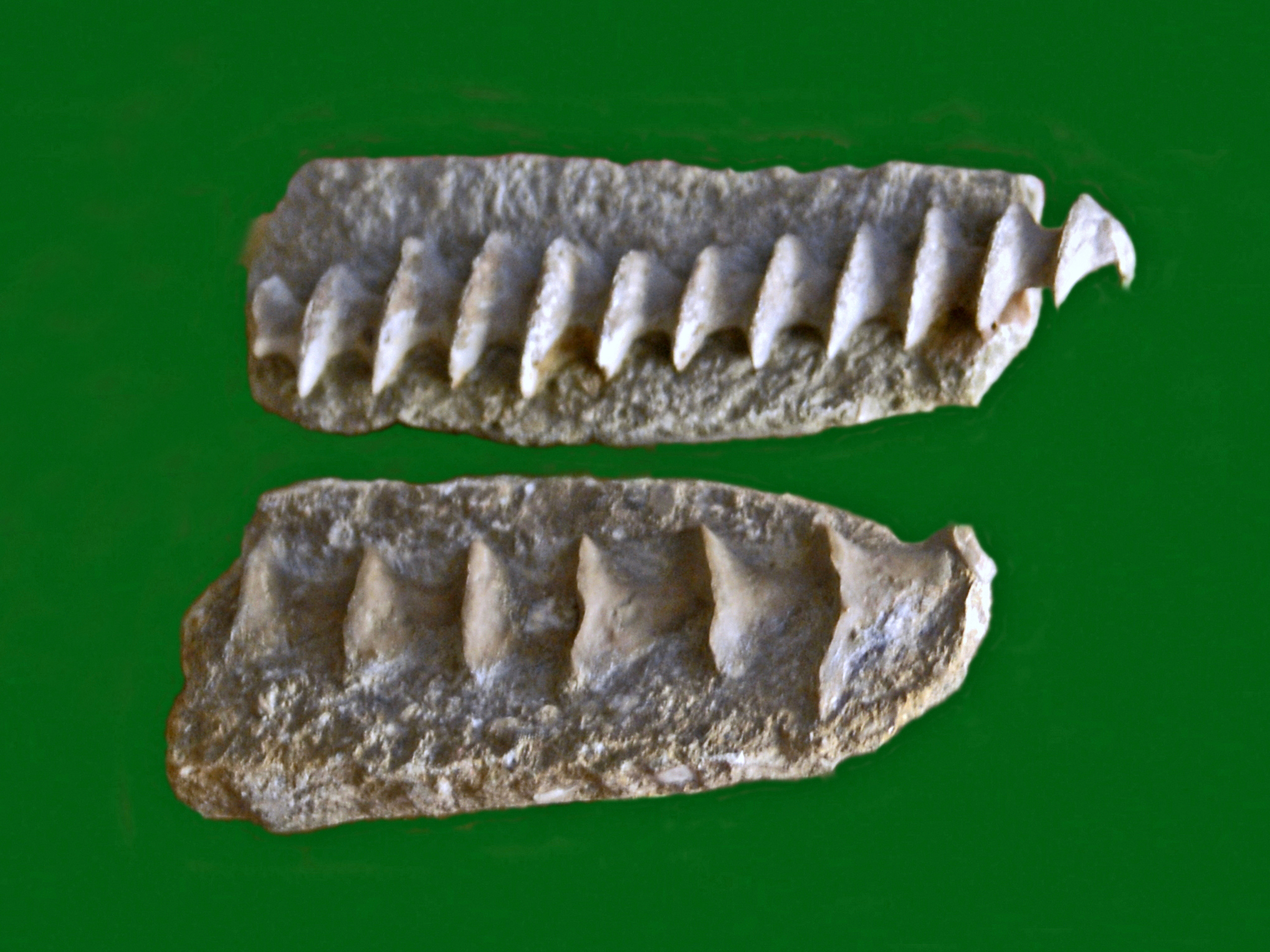
- Fossils of the Carboniferous-Permian bryozoan Archimedes
  †Archimedes
  - †Archimedes communis
  - †Archimedes compactus
  - †Archimedes confertus
  - †Archimedes distans
  - †Archimedes invaginatus
  - †Archimedes lativolvis
  - †Archimedes macfarlani
  - †Archimedes meekanoides
  - †Archimedes meekanus
  - †Archimedes proutanus
  - †Archimedes sublaxus
  - †Archimedes swallowvanus
  - †Archimedes terebriformis
- †Archinacella
  - †Archinacella simulatrix
- †Arnoldella
  - †Arnoldella minuta
- †Arthraria
  - †Arthraria rogersensis
- †Arthropitys
  - †Arthropitys communis
- †Arthroxylon
- †Asolanus
- †Aspidopora
  - †Aspidopora newberryi
- †Astarella
- †Astartella – tentative report
  - †Astartella concentrica
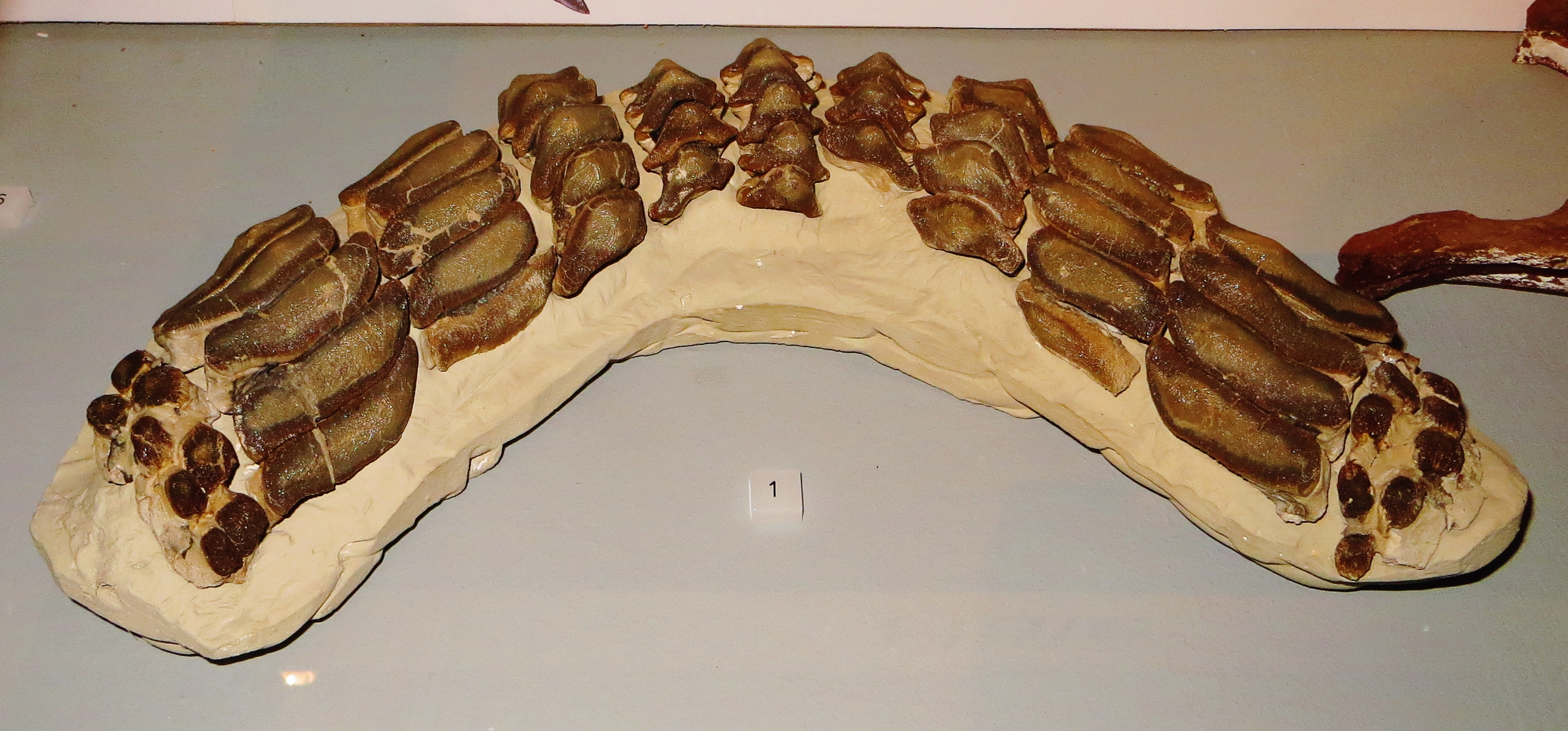
- Fossilized teeth of the Devonian-Cretaceous shark Asteracanthus
  †Asteracanthus
  - †Asteracanthus siderius – type locality for species
- †Asterophyllites
  - †Asterophyllites charaeformis
  - †Asterophyllites longifolius
- †Asthenophyllum
  - †Asthenophyllum davisi – type locality for species
  - †Asthenophyllum scitulum – tentative report
- †Astrocerium
  - †Astrocerium hisingeri
  - †Astrocerium niagarense
  - †Astrocerium venustum
- †Atactopora
- †Atactoporella
  - †Atactoporella newportensis
- †Atelestocrinus
  - †Atelestocrinus kentuckyensis – type locality for species
- †Athyris
  - †Athyris fultonensis
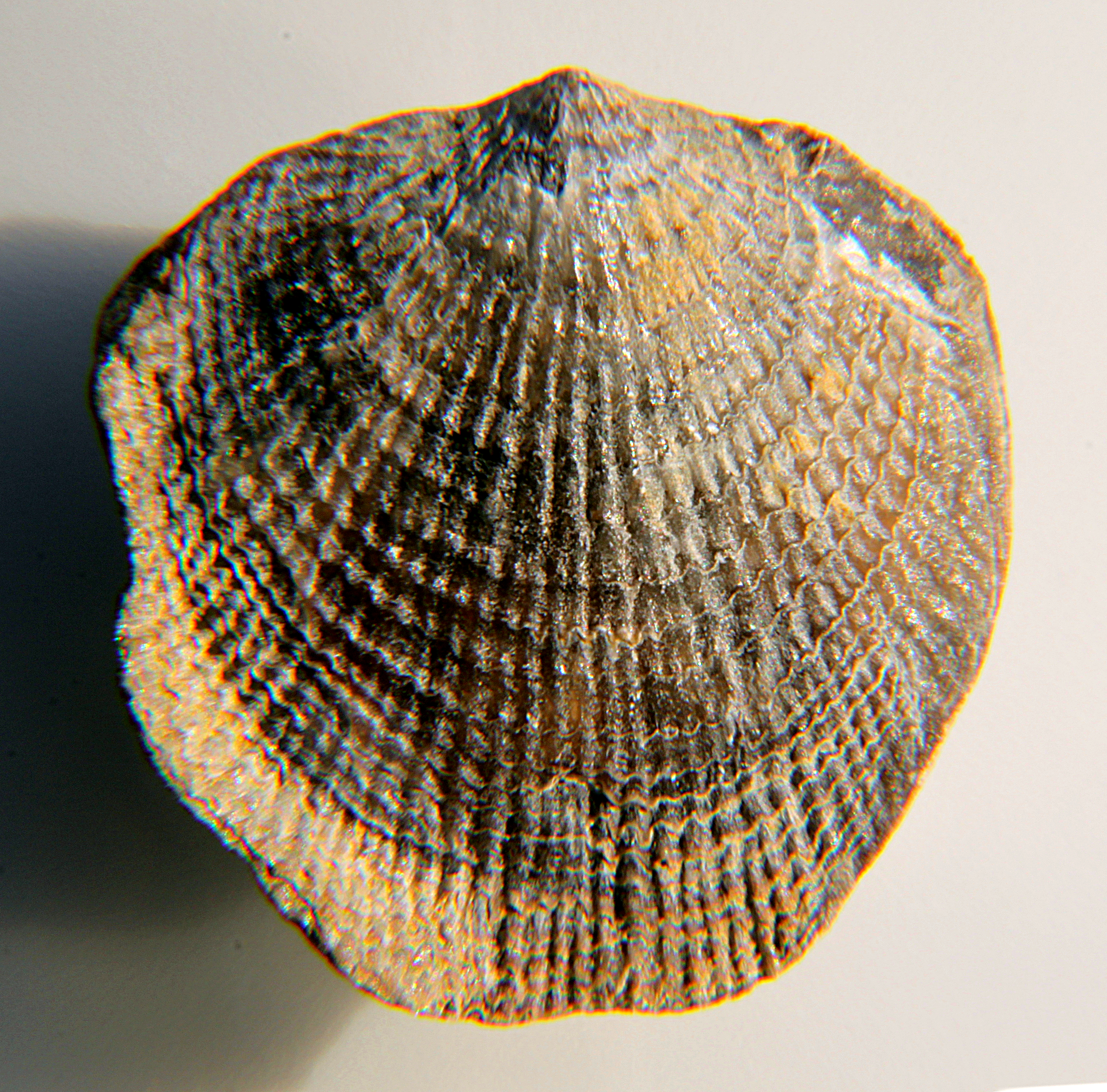
- Fossilized shell of the Late Ordovician-Carboniferous brachiopod Atrypa
  †Atrypa
- †Augustoceras
  - †Augustoceras shideleri – type locality for species
- †Aulacera
  - †Aulacera cylindrica
  - †Aulacera intermedia
  - †Aulacera nodulifera
  - †Aulacera plummeri
- †Aulocrinus
  - †Aulocrinus bellus
- †Aulocystis
  - †Aulocystis auloporoidea
  - †Aulocystis jacksoni
  - †Aulocystis procumbens – tentative report
  - †Aulocystis transitorius – type locality for species
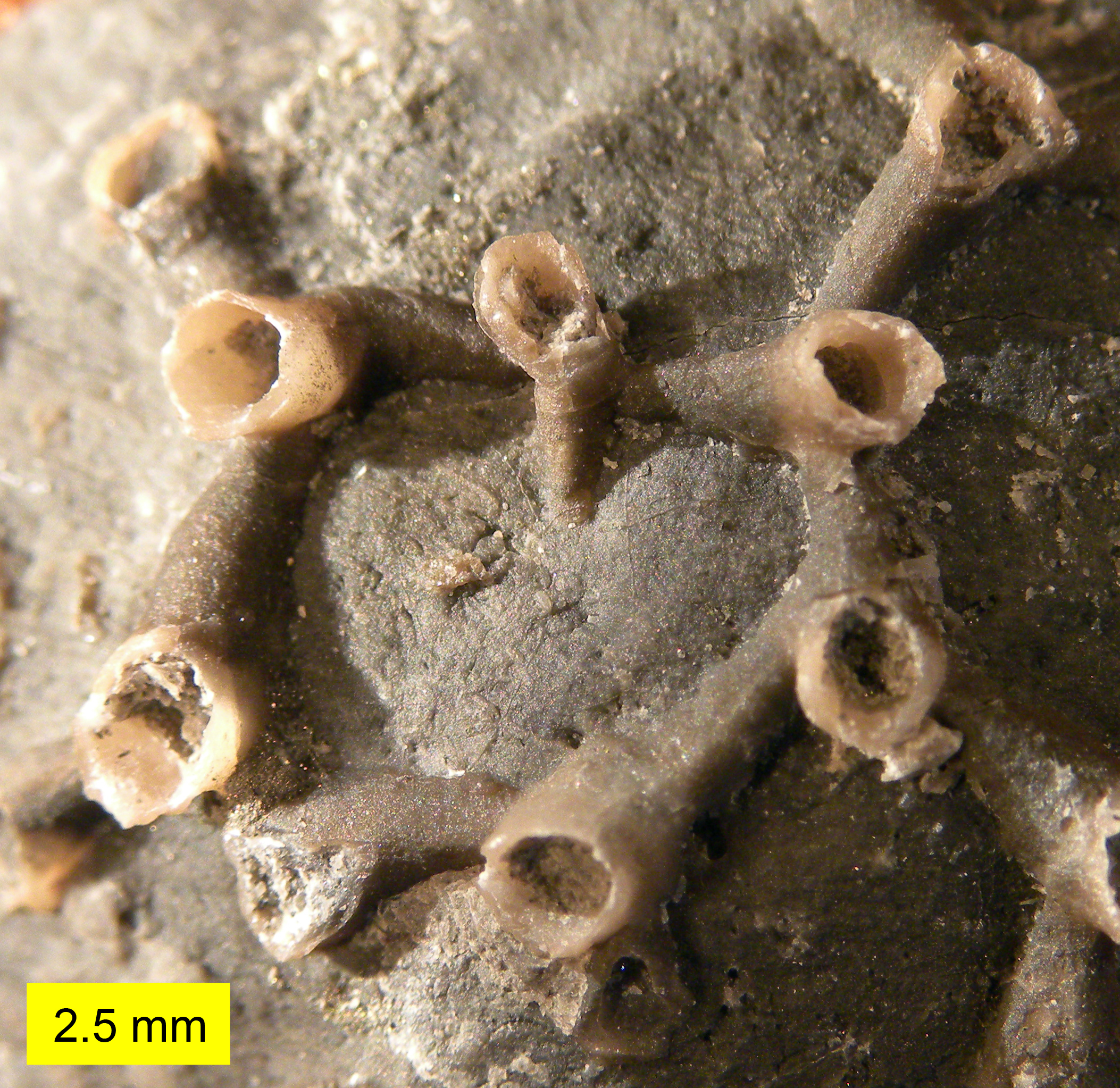
- Fossil of the Late Ordovician-Permian tabulate coral Aulopora
  †Aulopora
  - †Aulopora precius
  - †Aulopora pygmaea – tentative report
  - †Aulopora tubiporoides
- †Australosutura
- †Aviculopecten
  - †Aviculopecten germanus – or unidentified related form

== B ==
- Bairdia
  - †Bairdia salemensis
- †Balticopora
  - †Balticopora tenuimurale
- †Barycrinus
  - †Barycrinus asteriscus – or unidentified related form
  - †Barycrinus cornutus
  - †Barycrinus rhombiferus
  - †Barycrinus sculptilis
  - †Barycrinus sculptus
  - †Barycrinus spurius
  - †Barycrinus stellatus
  - †Barycrinus tumidus
- †Batherocystis
  - †Batherocystis appressa
- †Bathyurus
  - †Bathyurus ingalli – or unidentified comparable form
- †Batocrinus
  - †Batocrinus calyculus
  - †Batocrinus icosodactylus
  - †Batocrinus spergenensis
- †Batostoma
  - †Batostoma humile – or unidentified comparable form
- †Batostomella
  - †Batostomella gracilis
- †Beecheria
  - †Beecheria formosa – tentative report
- †Belemnospongia
  - †Belemnospongia parmula
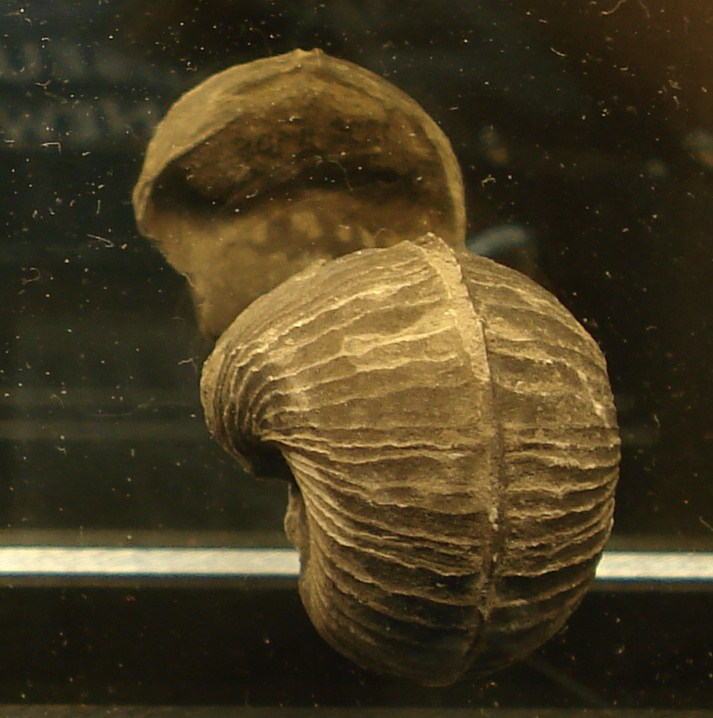
- Fossilized shell of the Silurian-Early Triassic mollusc Bellerophon
  †Bellerophon
- †Beloitoceras
  - †Beloitoceras huronense – or unidentified comparable form
- †Benthanyphyllum
  - †Benthanyphyllum prateriforme
  - †Benthanyphyllum robustum
- Berenicea
- †Beyrichia
  - †Beyrichia chambersi
- †Beyrichoceras
- †Billingsastraea
  - †Billingsastraea yandelli
- †Billingsocystis
  - †Billingsocystis invaginata
- †Bisatoceras – tentative report
- †Blairocrinus
  - †Blairocrinus protuberatus – type locality for species
- †Blothrocrinus
  - †Blothrocrinus swallovi
- †Blothrophyllum
  - †Blothrophyllum zaphrentiforme
- †Bolbopisthia
  - †Bolbopisthia progressa reticulata – or unidentified comparable form
- †Bollia
  - †Bollia persulcata
- †Borestus
- †Bostonia
  - †Bostonia perplexa
- †Bothrodendron
  - †Bothrodendron minutifolium
- †Bowmanites
  - †Bowmanites dawsoni
- †Brachiospongia
  - †Brachiospongia digitata
- †Brachymetopus
- †Brachythyris
  - †Brachythyris subcardiformis
  - †Brachythyris suborbicularis
- †Bucanapsis
- †Bucania
  - †Bucania halli
  - †Bucania pojetai – type locality for species
  - †Bucania rugatina
  - †Bucania subangulata
  - †Bucania sublata
- †Bucanopsis
  - †Bucanopsis carinifera
  - †Bucanopsis diabloensis
- †Bulimorpha
  - †Bulimorpha bulimiformis
  - †Bulimorpha elongata
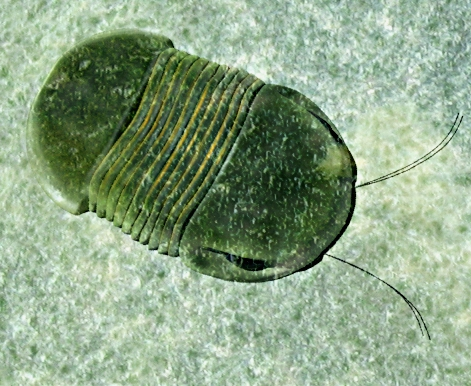
- Life restoration of the Early Ordovician-Silurian trilobite Bumastus
  †Bumastus
- †Byssonychia
  - †Byssonychia radiata
  - †Byssonychia richmondensis
- Bythocypris
  - †Bythocypris cylindrica
  - †Bythocypris lydeae

== C ==
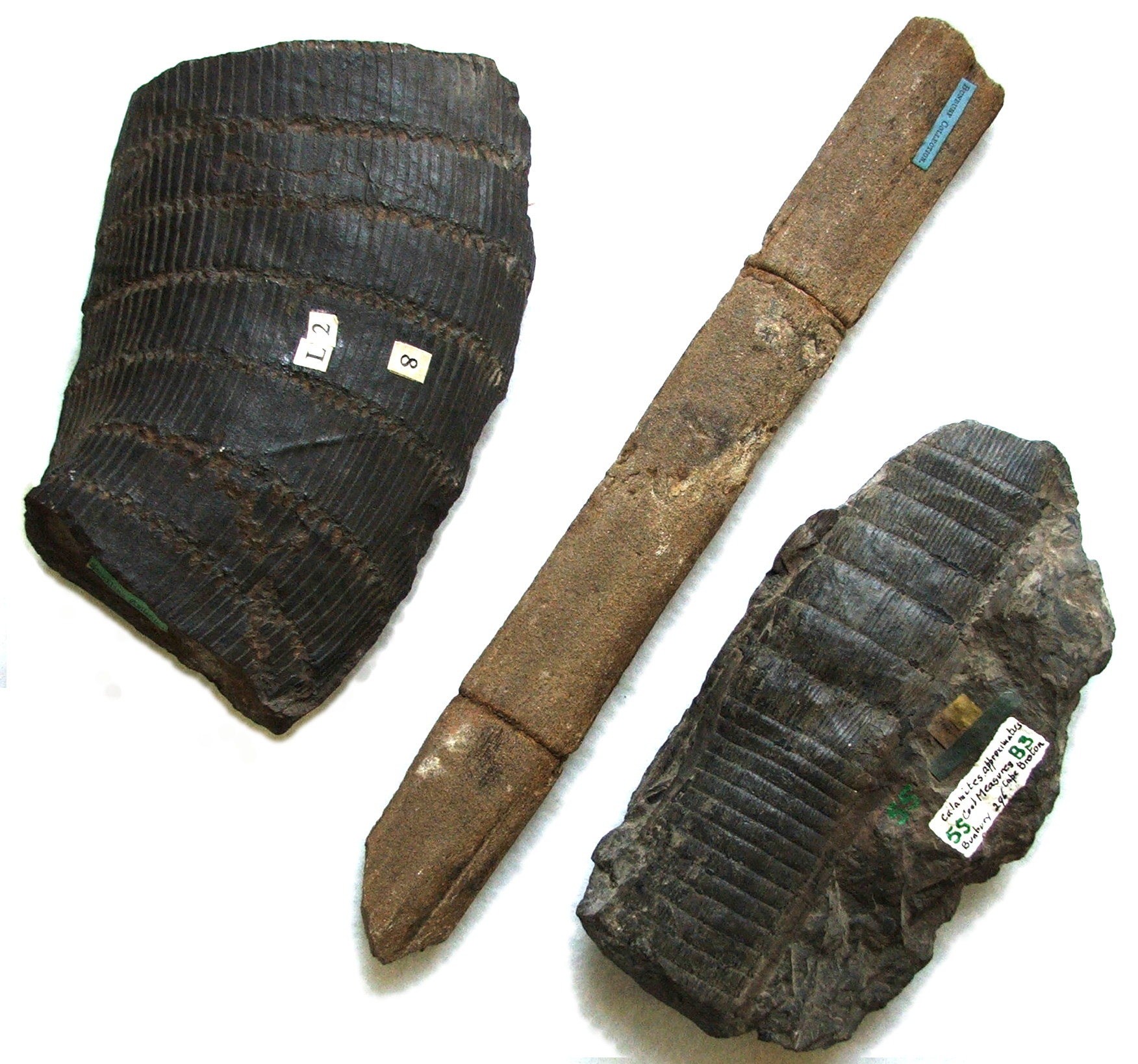
- Fossilized stems from the Carboniferous-Permian horsetail relative Calamites
  †Calamites
  - †Calamites cistii
  - †Calamites undulatus
- †Calamocarpon
  - †Calamocarpon insignis
- †Calamopitys
  - †Calamopitys americana
  - †Calamopitys foerstei
- †Calamopteris
  - †Calamopteris hippocrepis
- †Calamoptys
  - †Calamoptys foerstei
- †Calamospora
  - †Calamospora hartungiana
- †Calamostachys
  - †Calamostachys binneyana
- †Calapoecia
  - †Calapoecia huronensis
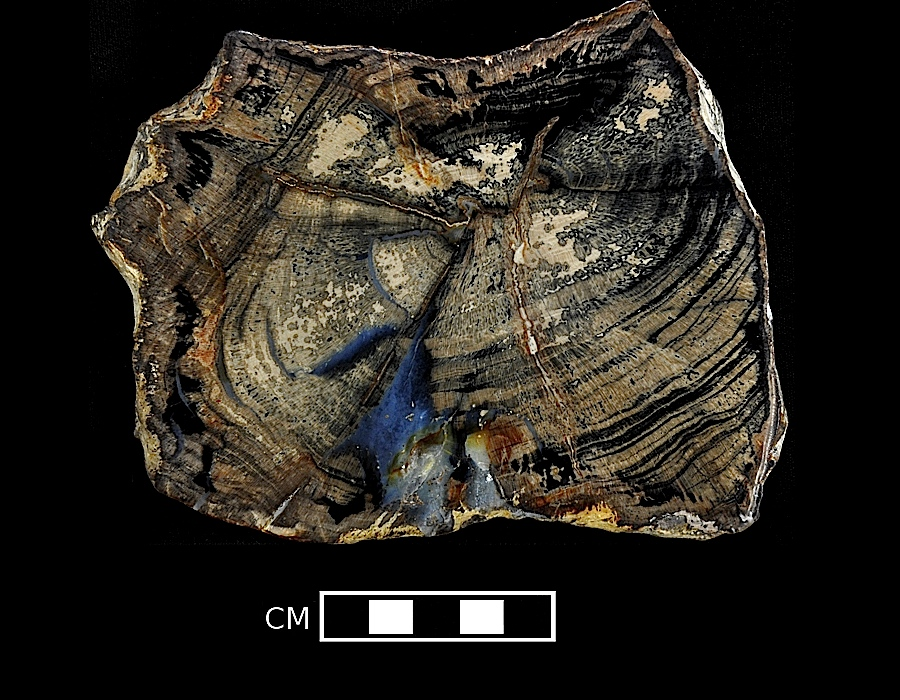
- A polished round of the permineralised Late Devonian-Carboniferous wood Callixylon
  †Callixylon
  - †Callixylon brownii
- †Calopora
  - †Calopora ramosa
- †Calostylis
  - †Calostylis lindstroemi
  - †Calostylis spongiosa
- †Calyptaulax
  - †Calyptaulax strasburgensis – or unidentified comparable form
- †Camarotoechia
  - †Camarotoechia mutata
- †Camerella
  - †Camerella immatura – or unidentified related form
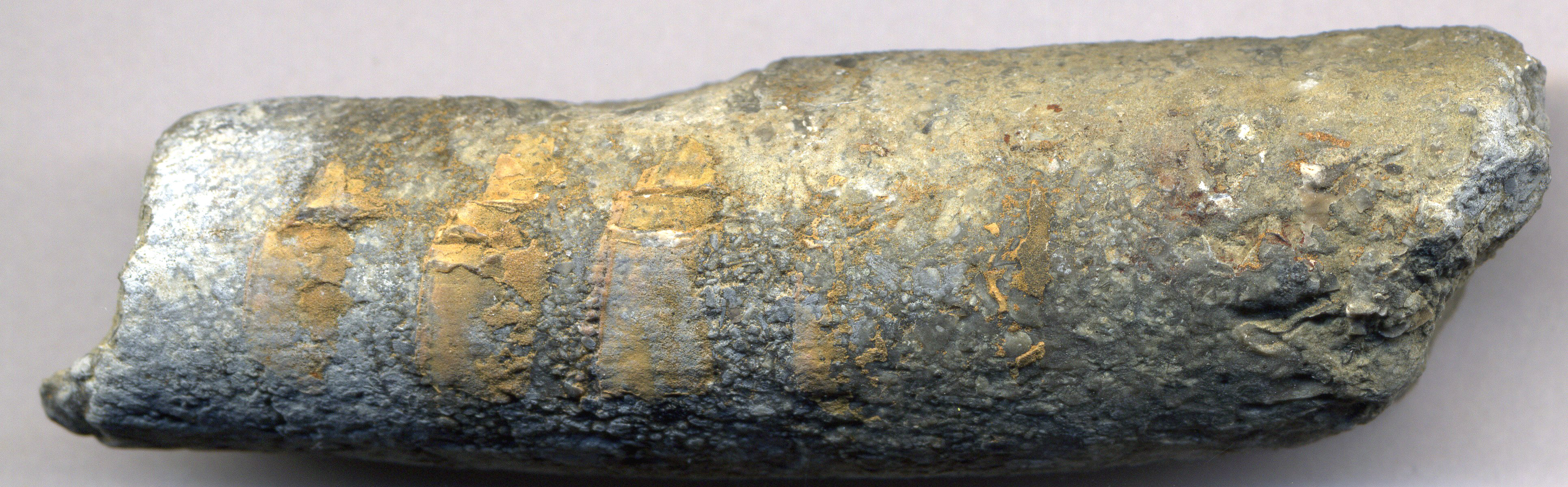
- Fossilized shell of the Middle Ordovician-Silurian nautiloid cephalopod Cameroceras
  †Cameroceras
  - †Cameroceras rowenaense – type locality for species
  - †Cameroceras trentonense – or unidentified comparable form
- †Camptocrinus
  - †Camptocrinus crawfordsvillensis
  - †Camptocrinus nudus
- †Canadocystis
  - †Canadocystis tennesseensis
- †Cantabricanites – tentative report
  - †Cantabricanites greenei
- †Carabocrinus
  - †Carabocrinus micropunctatus
  - †Carabocrinus plate – informal
- †Carinaropsis
  - †Carinaropsis cymbula
  - †Carinaropsis explanata – type locality for species
  - †Carinaropsis minima
- †Cartersoceras
  - †Cartersoceras popei – type locality for species
  - †Cartersoceras shideleri
- †Catillocrinus
  - †Catillocrinus tennesseeae
- †Cavellina
- †Ceramophylla
  - †Ceramophylla alternatum
- †Ceramoporella
- †Cerartoleperditia
  - †Cerartoleperditia kentuckyensis
- †Ceratopsis
  - †Ceratopsis chambersi
  - †Ceratopsis intemedia
  - †Ceratopsis intermedia
  - †Ceratopsis oculifera – or unidentified related form
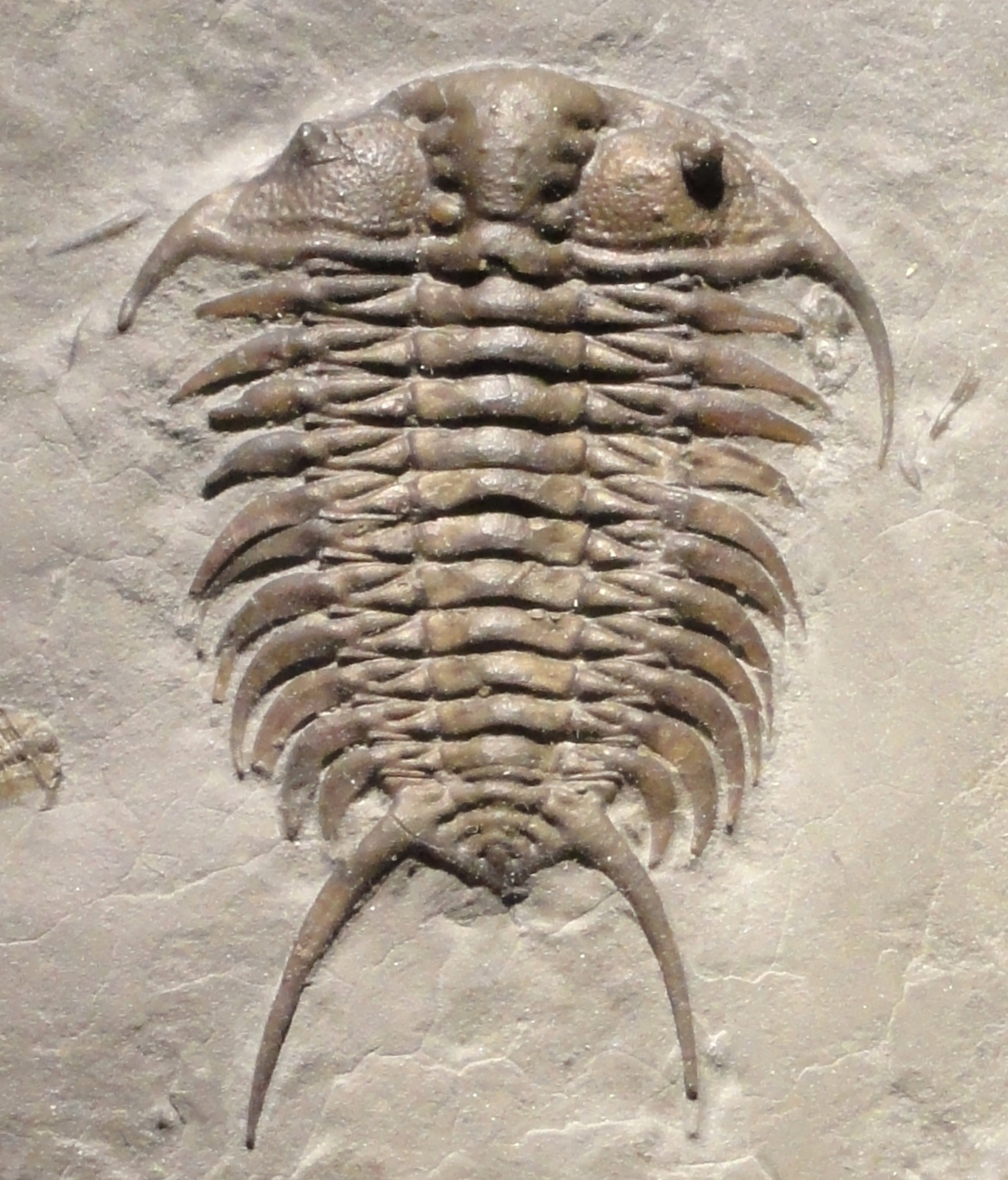
- Fossil of the Middle-Late Ordovician trilobite Ceraurus
  †Ceraurus
- †Cestocrinus – tentative report
- †Chasmatopora
- †Cheirocystis
  - †Cheirocystis fultonensis – type locality for species
- †Chonetes
- †Cincinnaticrinus
  - †Cincinnaticrinus varibrachialis
- †Cincinnetina
  - †Cincinnetina meeki
  - †Cincinnetina multisecta
- †Cladochonus
  - †Cladochonus beecheri
  - †Cladochonus crassus
- †Cladopora
  - †Cladopora aculeata
  - †Cladopora acupicta
  - †Cladopora bifura
  - †Cladopora gulielmi
  - †Cladopora imbricata
  - †Cladopora menis – tentative report
  - †Cladopora ordinata
  - †Cladopora reticulata
- †Cladoxylon
- †Clathrospira
  - †Clathrospira conica
  - †Clathrospira subconica
- †Claudeonychia – tentative report
  - †Claudeonychia byrnesi
- †Cleionychia
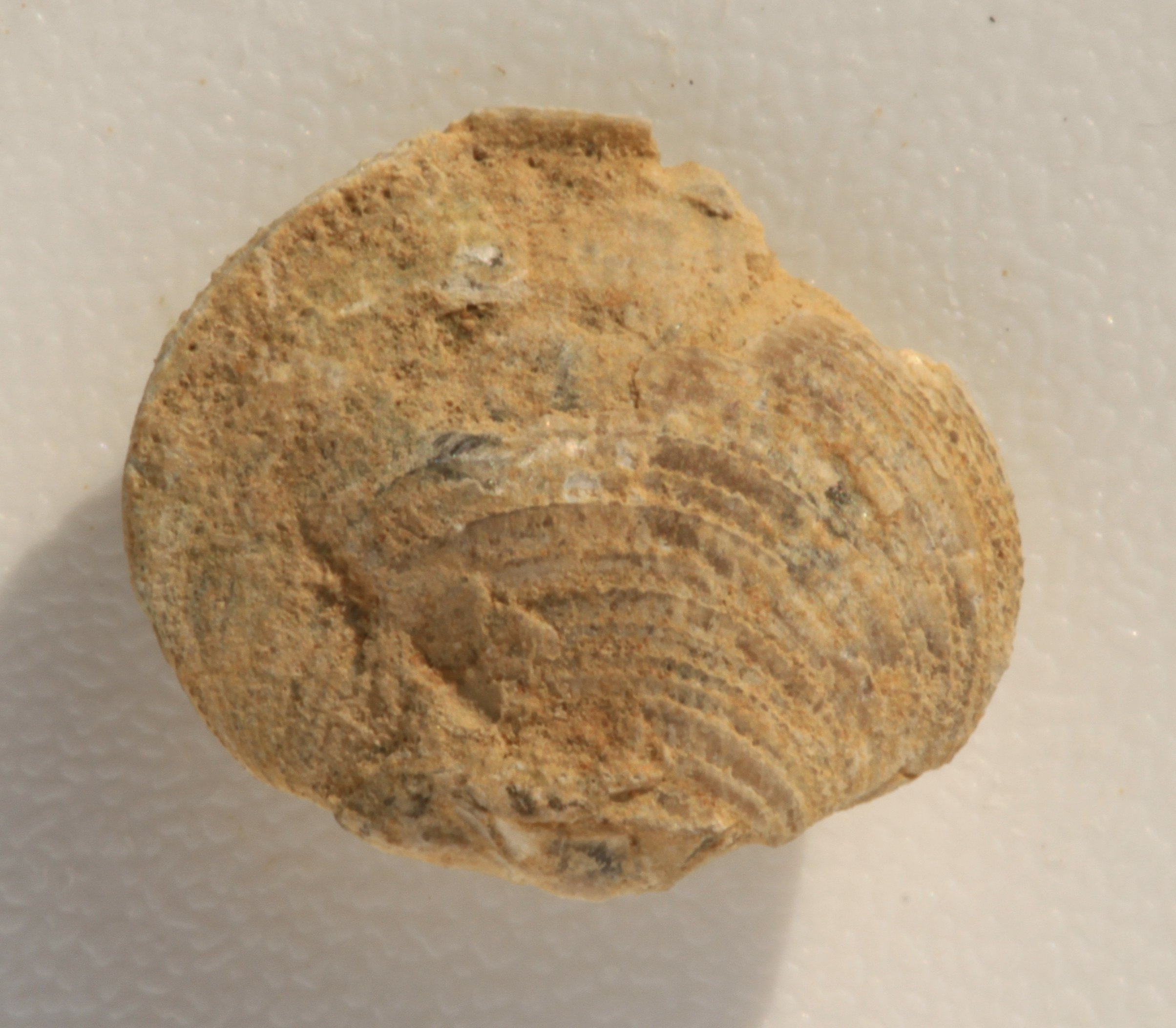
- Fossilized shell of the Middle Devonian-Permian brachiopod Cleiothyridina
  †Cleiothyridina
  - †Cleiothyridina hirsuta
  - †Cleiothyridina sublamellosa
- †Clepsydropsis
  - †Clepsydropsis bertrandi
  - †Clepsydropsis campbelli
  - †Clepsydropsis chaneyi
  - †Clepsydropsis titan
- †Climacograptus
  - †Climacograptus putillus
- †Clinopistha
  - †Clinopistha radiata
- †Codaster
  - †Codaster jessieae
- †Coeliocrinus
  - †Coeliocrinus subspinosus
- †Coenites
  - †Coenites verticillatus
- †Colaptomena
- †Colpomya
  - †Colpomya constricta
  - †Colpomya faba
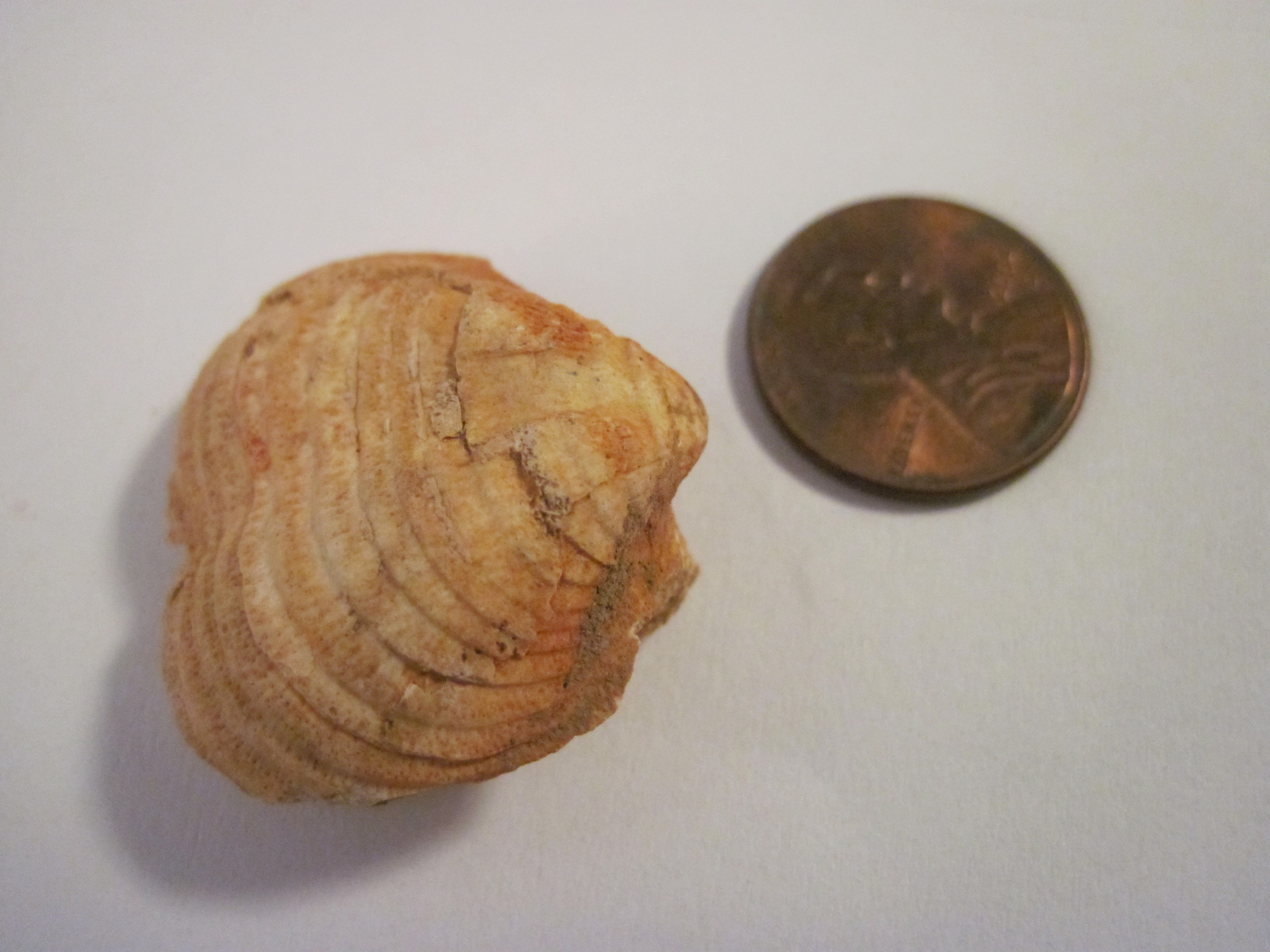
- Fossilized shell of the Late Devonian-Permian brachiopod Composita
  †Composita
  - †Composita subquadrata
  - †Composita trinuclea
- †Conostoma
  - †Conostoma anglogermanicum
  - †Conostoma oblongum
- †Constellaria
  - †Constellaria florida – or unidentified comparable form
  - †Constellaria teres
- †Conularia
  - †Conularia formosa
  - †Conularia trentonensis
- †Convolutispora
- †Coopericystis
  - †Coopericystis pyriformis
- †Cordaites
  - †Cordaites felicis
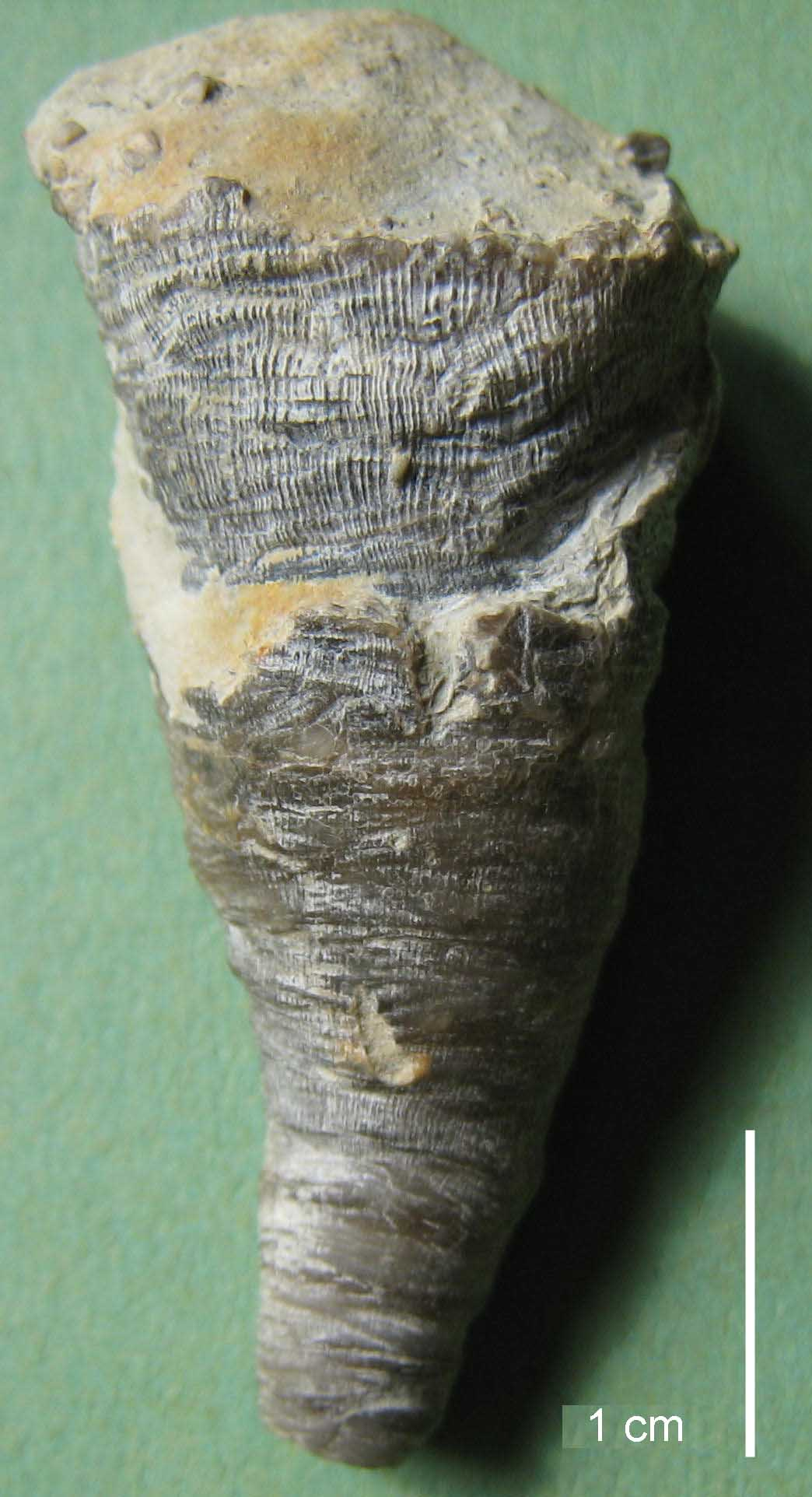
- Fossil of the Middle Ordovician-Carboniferous horn coral Cornulites
  †Cornulites
- †Coronocystis
  - †Coronocystis angulatus
- †Cosmetocrinus
  - †Cosmetocrinus gracilis
- †Costalocrinus
  - †Costalocrinus conkini – type locality for species
  - †Costalocrinus cornutus
  - †Costalocrinus rex
- †Costatulites
  - †Costatulites richmondensis
- †Crania – tentative report
- †Craniops
  - †Craniops cincinnatiensis
- †Crassispora
  - †Crassispora kosankei
- †Craterophyllum
  - †Craterophyllum adnascens
  - †Craterophyllum invaginatum
  - †Craterophyllum solitarium
- †Cryptolithus
  - †Cryptolithus bellulus
  - †Cryptolithus recurvus
  - †Cryptolithus tesselatus
- †Ctenobolbina
  - †Ctenobolbina ciliata
- †Ctenodonta
  - †Ctenodonta logani – or unidentified related form
  - †Ctenodonta longa – or unidentified related form
  - †Ctenodonta nasuta – or unidentified comparable form
  - †Ctenodonta obliqua
  - †Ctenodonta regia
  - †Ctenodonta socialis
- †Cuffeyella
  - †Cuffeyella arachnoidea
- †Culmicrinus
  - †Culmicrinus verus
- †Cuneamya
- †Cupulocrinus
- †Cyathactis
  - †Cyathactis sedentarius
  - †Cyathactis typus
- †Cyathaxonia
  - †Cyathaxonia venusta
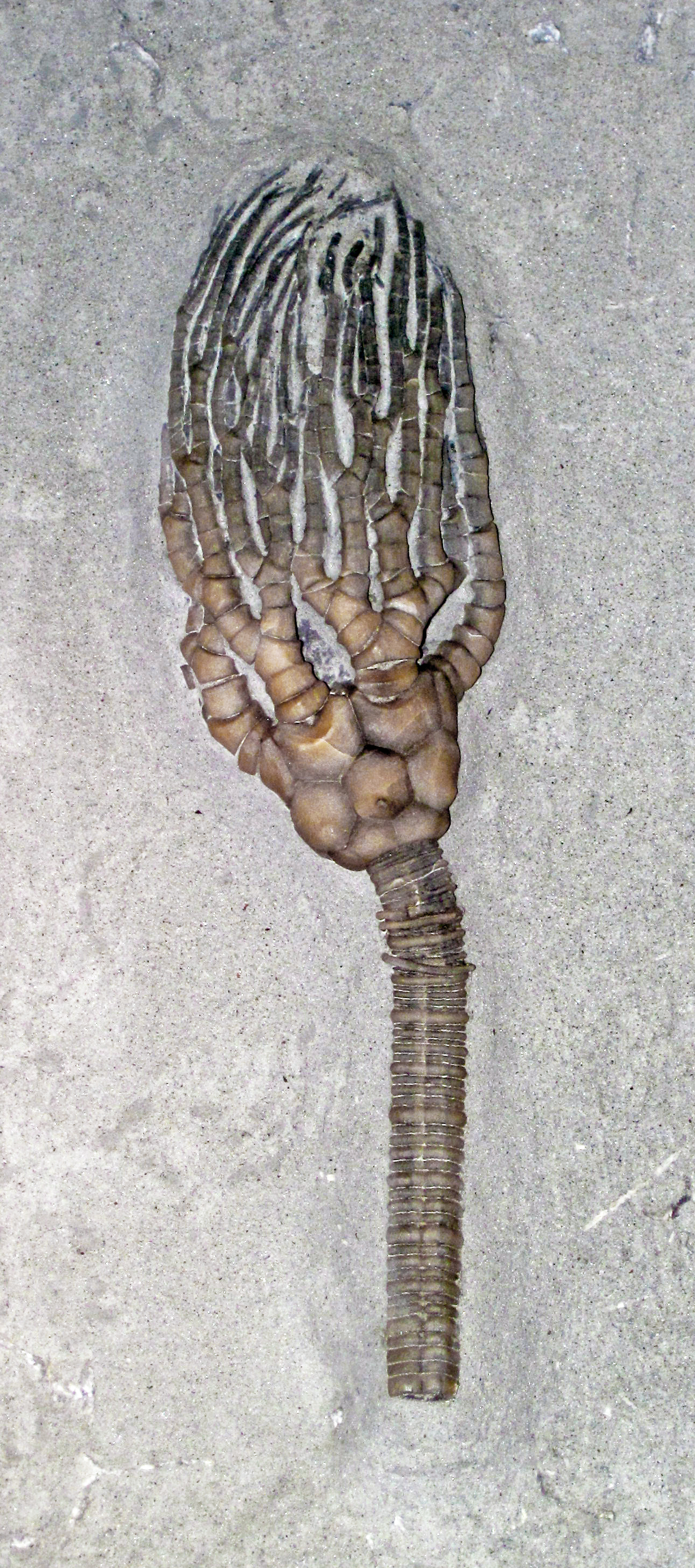
- Fossilized calyx and partial stem of the Silurian-Permian crinoid ("sea lily") Cyathocrinites
  †Cyathocrinites
  - †Cyathocrinites asperrimus
  - †Cyathocrinites astralus – type locality for species
  - †Cyathocrinites farleyi
  - †Cyathocrinites glenni
  - †Cyathocrinites iowensis
  - †Cyathocrinites kelloggi
  - †Cyathocrinites multibrachiatus
  - †Cyathocrinites nodosus
  - †Cyathocrinites parvibrachiatus
- †Cyathophylloides
- †Cybelinidae
  - †Cybelinidae cranidium – informal
- †Cycloconcha
  - †Cycloconcha milleri
  - †Cycloconcha ovata – or unidentified related form
- †Cyclocyclopa
- †Cyclocystoides
- †Cyclogranisporites
  - †Cyclogranisporites aureus – or unidentified comparable form
  - †Cyclogranisporites minutus
- †Cyclonema
  - †Cyclonema minuta
- †Cyclopentagonopa
- †Cyclora – tentative report
- †Cydrocrinus
  - †Cydrocrinus concinnus – tentative report
  - †Cydrocrinus subramulosus – tentative report
- †Cymatonota
- †Cyphaspis
- †Cyphotrypa
  - †Cyphotrypa acervulosa
  - †Cyphotrypa clarksvillensis
- †Cypricardinia
  - †Cypricardinia indianensis
- †Cyrtina
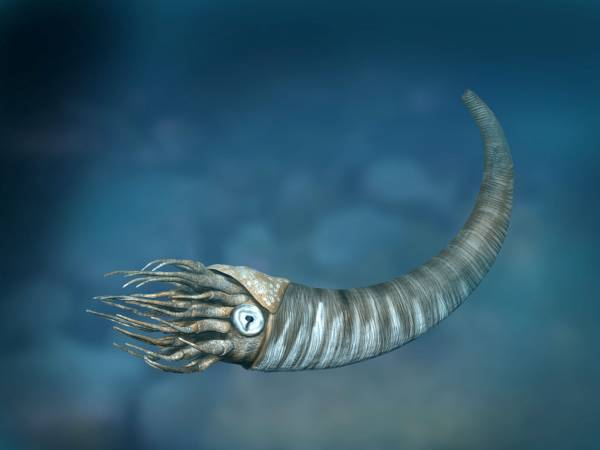
- Restoration of the Cambrian-Middle Devonian nautiloid cephalopod Cyrtoceras
  †Cyrtoceras
- †Cyrtodonta
  - †Cyrtodonta grandis
  - †Cyrtodonta subovata
- †Cyrtodontula
  - †Cyrtodontula umbonata
- †Cyrtolites
  - †Cyrtolites claysferryensis – type locality for species
  - †Cyrtolites inornatum
  - †Cyrtolites ornatus – tentative report
  - †Cyrtolites retrorsus
- †Cyrtospira
  - †Cyrtospira bicurvata – type locality for species
- †Cyrtostropha
  - †Cyrtostropha salteri
- †Cystihalysites
  - †Cystihalysites nexus
- †Cystiphylloides
  - †Cystiphylloides americanum
  - †Cystiphylloides crassatum
- †Cystiphyllum
  - †Cystiphyllum granilineatum
  - †Cystiphyllum niagarense
  - †Cystiphyllum spinulosum
- †Cystodictya
  - †Cystodictya lineata
- Cytherella

== D ==
- †Dalejina
- †Dalmanella
  - †Dalmanella emacerata
  - †Dalmanella fertilis
  - †Dalmanella sulcata
- †Dalmanophyllum
  - †Dalmanophyllum gainesi
  - †Dalmanophyllum herzeri
  - †Dalmanophyllum linguliferum
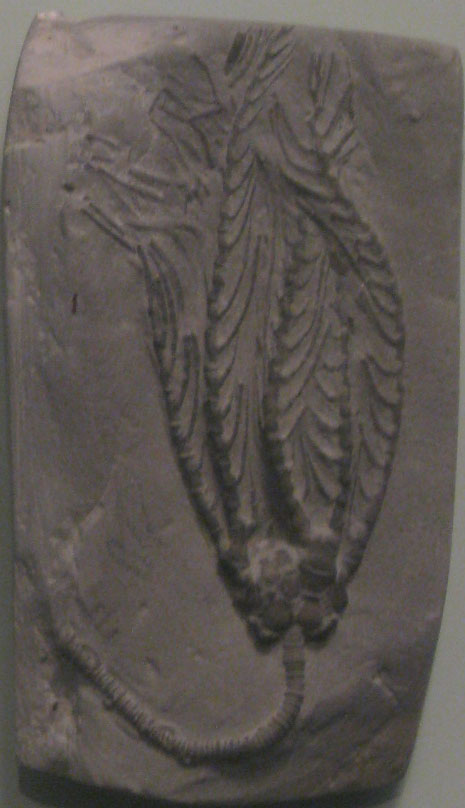
- Fossilized calyx of the Carboniferous crinoid ("sea lily") Decadocrinus
  †Decadocrinus
  - †Decadocrinus scalaris
- †Deceptrix
  - †Deceptrix hartsvillensis – or unidentified comparable form
  - †Deceptrix perminuta
- †Declinognathodus
  - †Declinognathodus delicatus – or unidentified related form
  - †Declinognathodus donetzianus
  - †Declinognathodus marginodosus
- †Decoroproetus
  - †Decoroproetus parviusculus
- †Deiroceras
  - †Deiroceras curdsvillense
- †Dekayia
- †Deliablastus
  - †Deliablastus cumberlandensis
- †Deltoidospora
  - †Deltoidospora priddyi
- †Densosporites
  - †Densosporites annulatus
  - †Densosporites glandulosus
  - †Densosporites sphaerotriangularis
- †Dentiblastus
- †Diabolocrinus
  - †Diabolocrinus vesperalis
- †Dichocrinus
  - †Dichocrinus ficus – tentative report
  - †Dichocrinus gracilis
  - †Dichocrinus pocillum – tentative report
  - †Dichocrinus simplex
  - †Dichocrinus ulrichi
- †Dictyophlois
  - †Dictyophlois reticulata
- †Dictyotomaria
  - †Dictyotomaria nyi
- †Dictyotriletes
  - †Dictyotriletes bireticulatus
- †Dielasma
  - †Dielasma formosa
- †Diestoceras
  - †Diestoceras indianense
- †Diichnia
  - †Diichnia kentuckiensis
- †Dilobella
- †Dimegelasma
- †Dimorphoceratoides
  - †Dimorphoceratoides adamsi – type locality for species
- †Dinophyllum
  - †Dinophyllum hoskinsoni
  - †Dinophyllum stokesi
- †Dinorthis
  - †Dinorthis pectinella
- †Diorychopora
  - †Diorychopora tenuis
- †Diploblastus
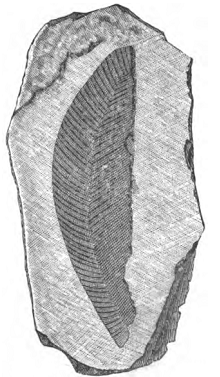
- Cambrian graptolite Diplograptus
  †Diplograptus
- †Disphyllum
  - †Disphyllum synaptophylloides
- †Dizygocrinus
  - †Dizygocrinus biturbinatus
  - †Dizygocrinus montgomeryensis
  - †Dizygocrinus whitei
- †Doleroides
- †Dolichoharpes
- †Donaldina
  - †Donaldina zadoe
- †Dorycrinus
  - †Dorycrinus gouldi
  - †Dorycrinus quinquelobus
- †Drymopora
  - †Drymopora fascicularis
- †Dzhaprakoceras
  - †Dzhaprakoceras brodheadense – type locality for species

== E ==
- †Ectenocrinus
  - †Ectenocrinus simplex
- †Edaphophyllum
  - †Edaphophyllum laciniatum – tentative report
- †Edmondia
- †Edrioaster
  - †Edrioaster bigsbyi
  - †Edrioaster priscus
- †Emmonsia
  - †Emmonsia amplissima
  - †Emmonsia arbuscula
  - †Emmonsia bacula
  - †Emmonsia convexa
  - †Emmonsia emmonsi
  - †Emmonsia epidermata
  - †Emmonsia epidermi
  - †Emmonsia eximia
  - †Emmonsia radiciformis
  - †Emmonsia ramosa
  - †Emmonsia tuberosa
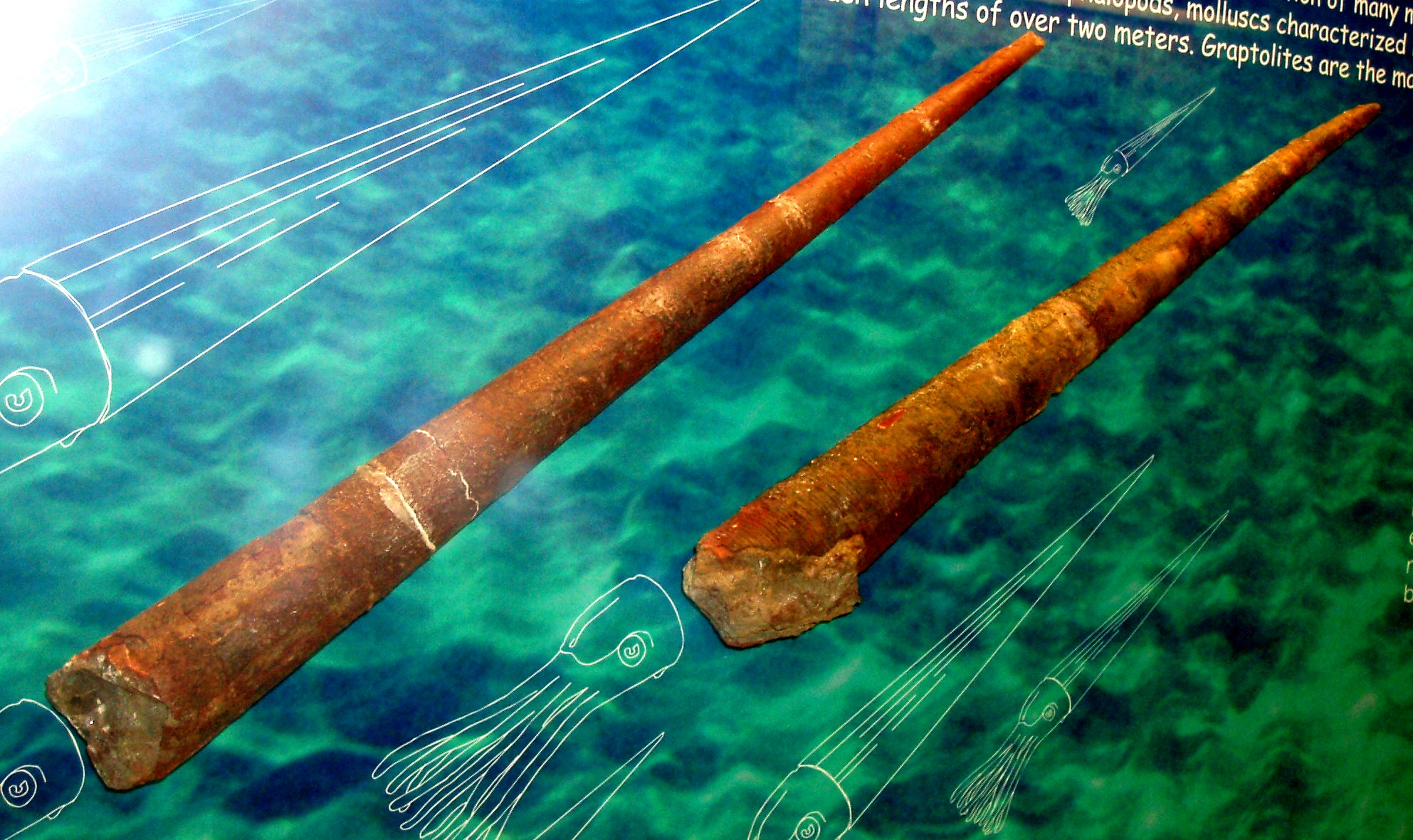
- Fossilized shells and restored appearances of the Middle-Late Ordovician nautiloid cephalopod Endoceras
  †Endoceras
  - †Endoceras proteiformis
- †Endothyra
  - †Endothyra baileyi
- †Endothyranella
  - †Endothyranella inflata
  - †Endothyranella kentuckyensis
- †Enoploura
  - †Enoploura punctata – or unidentified comparable form
- †Entelophyllum
  - †Entelophyllum eruciforme
  - †Entelophyllum rugosum
  - †Entelophyllum strictum
- Eocaudina
  - †Eocaudina gutschicki
  - †Eocaudina mccormacki
- †Eochonetes
  - †Eochonetes clarksvillensis
- †Eoleperditia
  - †Eoleperditia catheysensis – or unidentified comparable form
  - †Eoleperditia fabulites
- †Eolissochonetes
  - †Eolissochonetes morsei
- †Eopteria
  - †Eopteria conocardiformis
- †Eospirifer
- †Eotomaria
- †Ephippioceras
  - †Ephippioceras ferratum
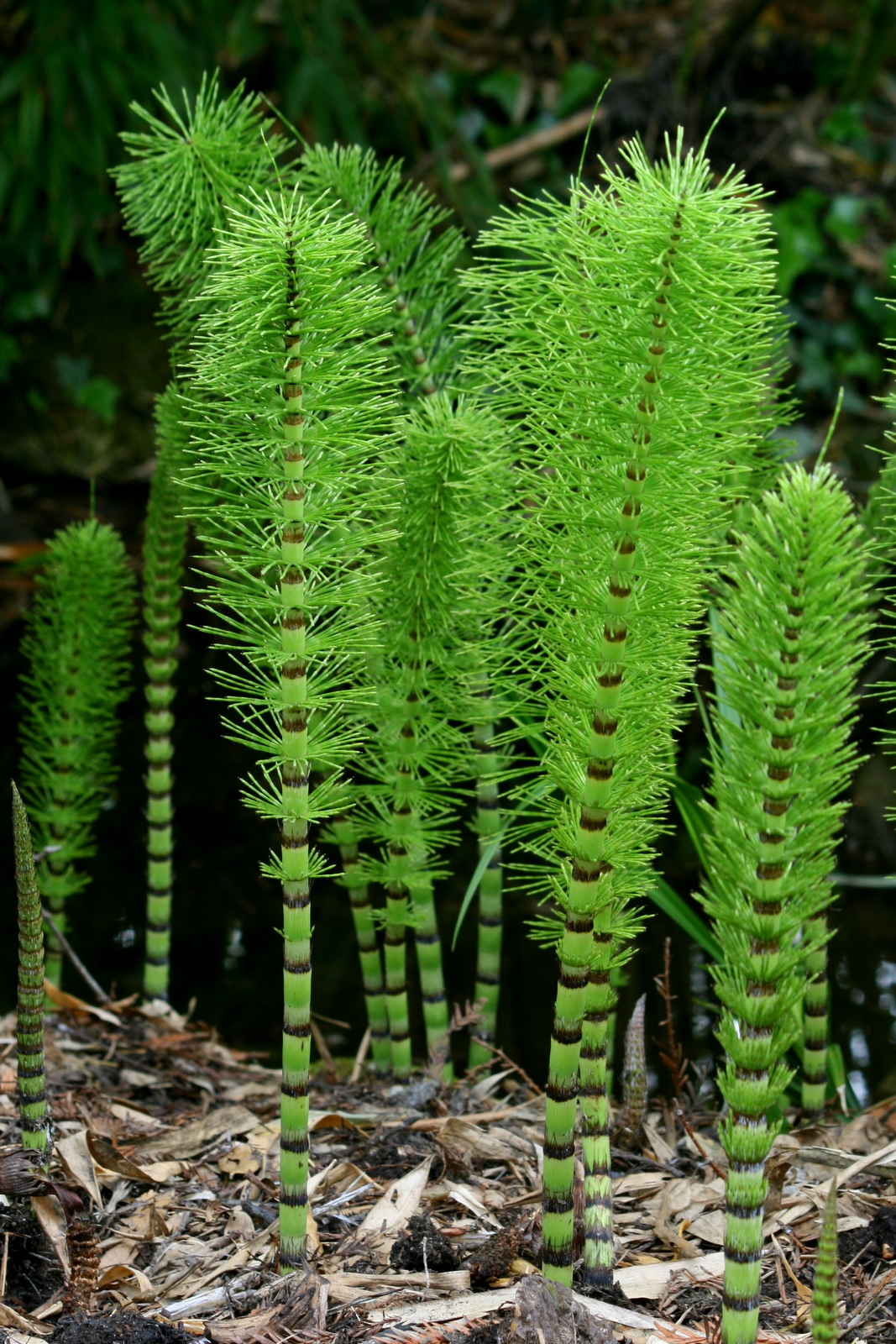
- A living Equisetum, or horsetail
  †Equisetum
  - †Equisetum arvense
- †Eratacrinus
  - †Eratacrinus coxanus
- †Eremopteris
  - †Eremopteris gracilis
- †Eretmocrinus
  - †Eretmocrinus cloelia
  - †Eretmocrinus magnificus
  - †Eretmocrinus ramulosus
  - †Eretmocrinus yandelli
- †Eridophyllum
  - †Eridophyllum archiaci
  - †Eridophyllum coagulatum
  - †Eridophyllum seriale
  - †Eridophyllum tumidulum
- †Eridopora
- †Eridorthis
  - †Eridorthis nicklesi
- †Eridotrypa
  - †Eridotrypa briareus – or unidentified comparable form
  - †Eridotrypa mutabilis
- †Escharopora
  - †Escharopora falciformis
  - †Escharopora hilli
  - †Escharopora nodulosa – or unidentified comparable form
- †Etheridgella
  - †Etheridgella biconvexa – type locality for species
- †Eucladocrinus
  - †Eucladocrinus millebrachiatus
- †Euconospira
  - †Euconospira conula
- †Eumetria
  - †Eumetria marcyi
  - †Eumetria vera
  - †Eumetria verneuiliana
  - †Eumetria verneuliana
- †Eunema
  - †Eunema centralis
  - †Eunema helicteres
- †Eunicites
- †Eupachycrinus
  - †Eupachycrinus germanus
  - †Eupachycrinus spartarius
- †Euphemites
  - †Euphemites randolphensis
- †Euryocrinus
  - †Euryocrinus tennesseensis

== F ==
- †Favistella
  - †Favistella alveolata
- †Favistina
  - †Favistina stellata
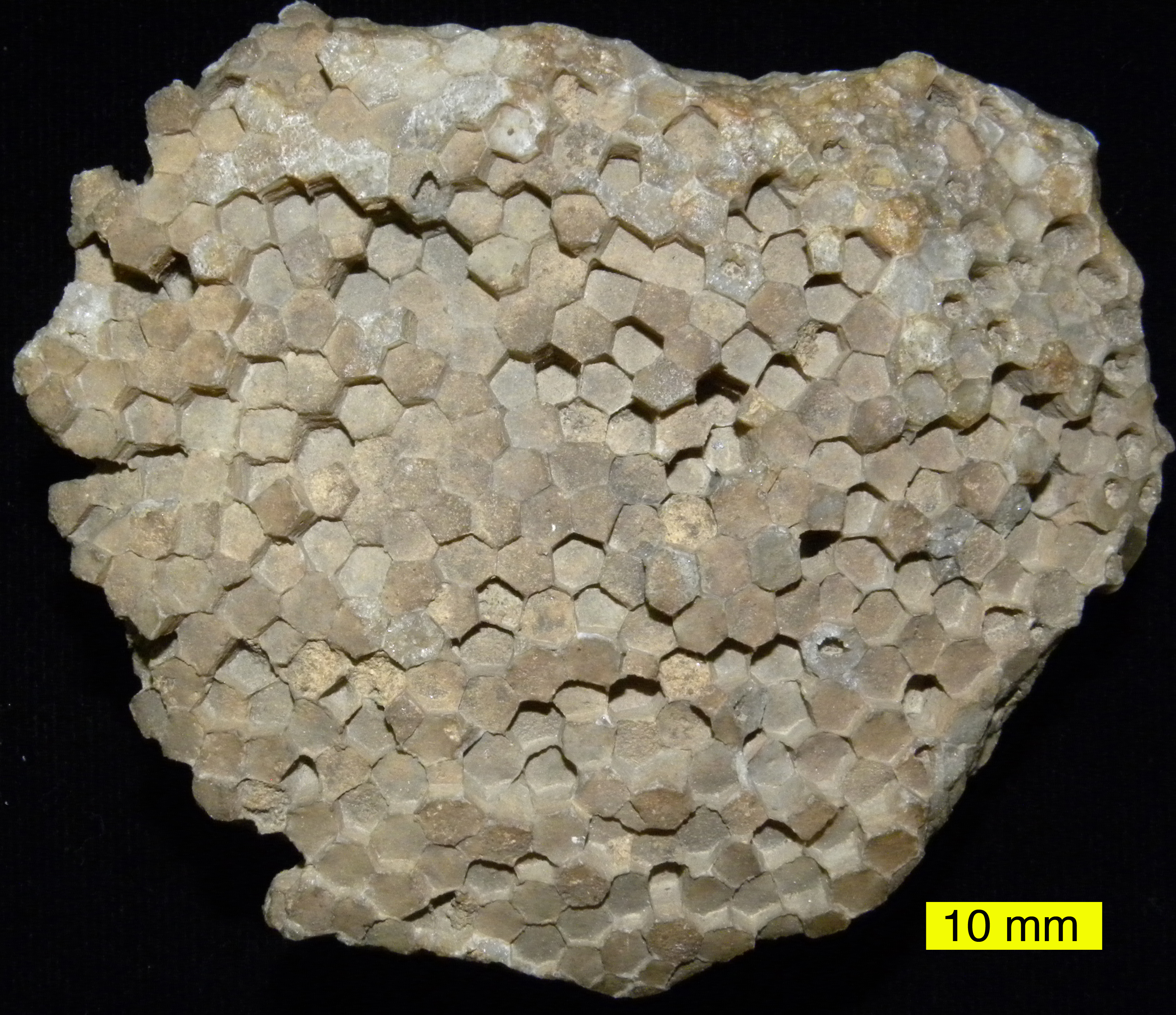
- Fossil of the Late Ordovician-Permian tabulate coral Favosites
  †Favosites
  - †Favosites arbor
  - †Favosites biloculi
  - †Favosites clausus
  - †Favosites delandi
  - †Favosites densitabulatus
  - †Favosites discoideus
  - †Favosites discus
  - †Favosites divergens
  - †Favosites favosus
  - †Favosites hamiltoniae
  - †Favosites hisingeri
  - †Favosites niagarensis
  - †Favosites placenta
  - †Favosites proximatus
  - †Favosites quercus
  - †Favosites rotundituba
  - †Favosites turbinatus
- †Fenestella
  - †Fenestella multispinosa
  - †Fenestella rudis
  - †Fenestella serratula
- †Fimbrispirifer
  - †Fimbrispirifer venustus
- †Fistulipora
  - †Fistulipora incrustans
  - †Fistulipora perdensa
  - †Fistulipora spergenensis
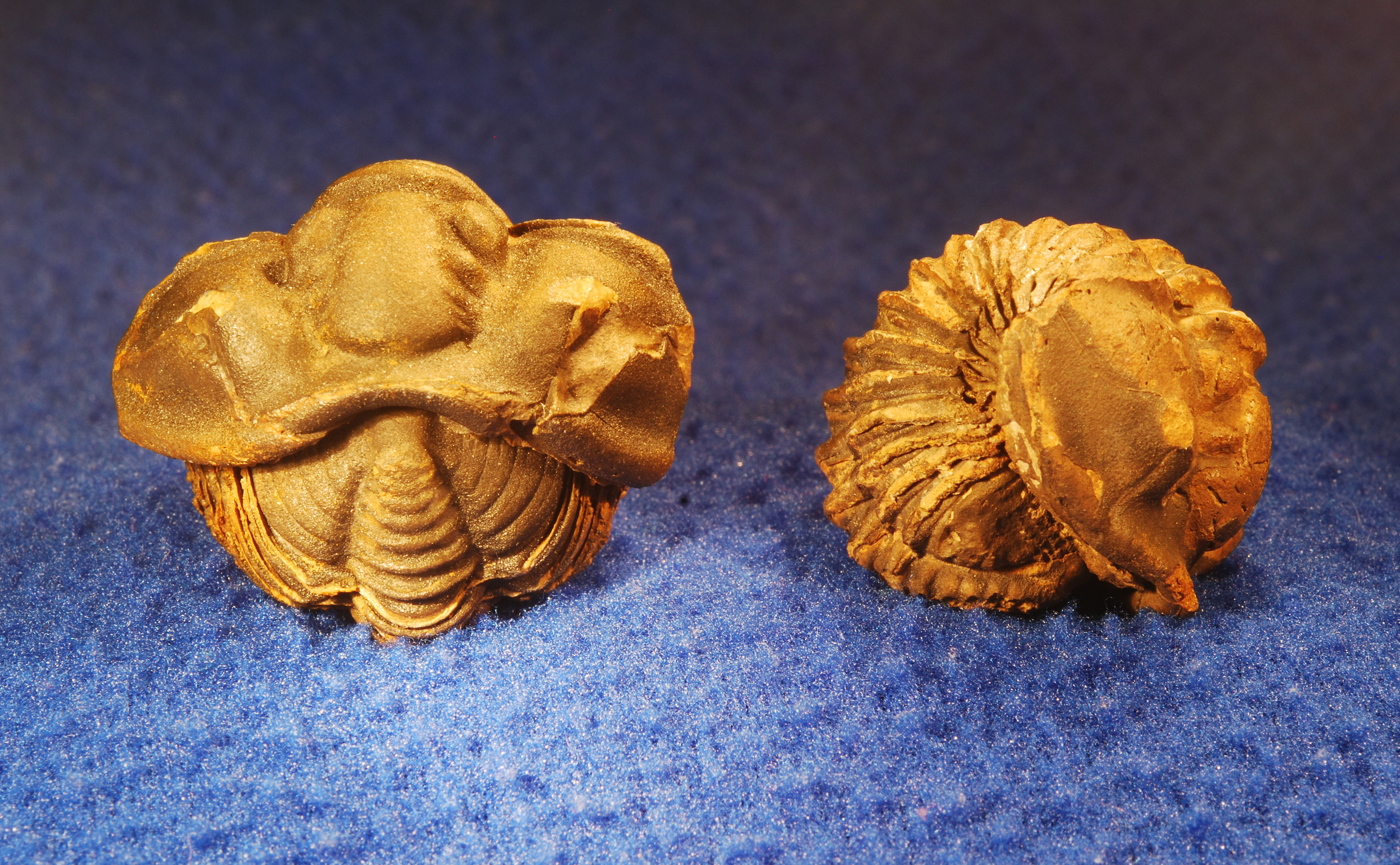
- Front (left) and right side (right) views of an enrolled fossil of the Middle Ordovician-Silurian trilobite Flexicalymene
  †Flexicalymene
  - †Flexicalymene granulosa
  - †Flexicalymene griphus
  - †Flexicalymene meeki
- †Florinites
  - †Florinites mediapudens
- †Foerstephyllum
  - †Foerstephyllum vacuum
- †Foerstia
  - †Foerstia ohioensis
- †Follotites
  - †Follotites bighillensis – type locality for species
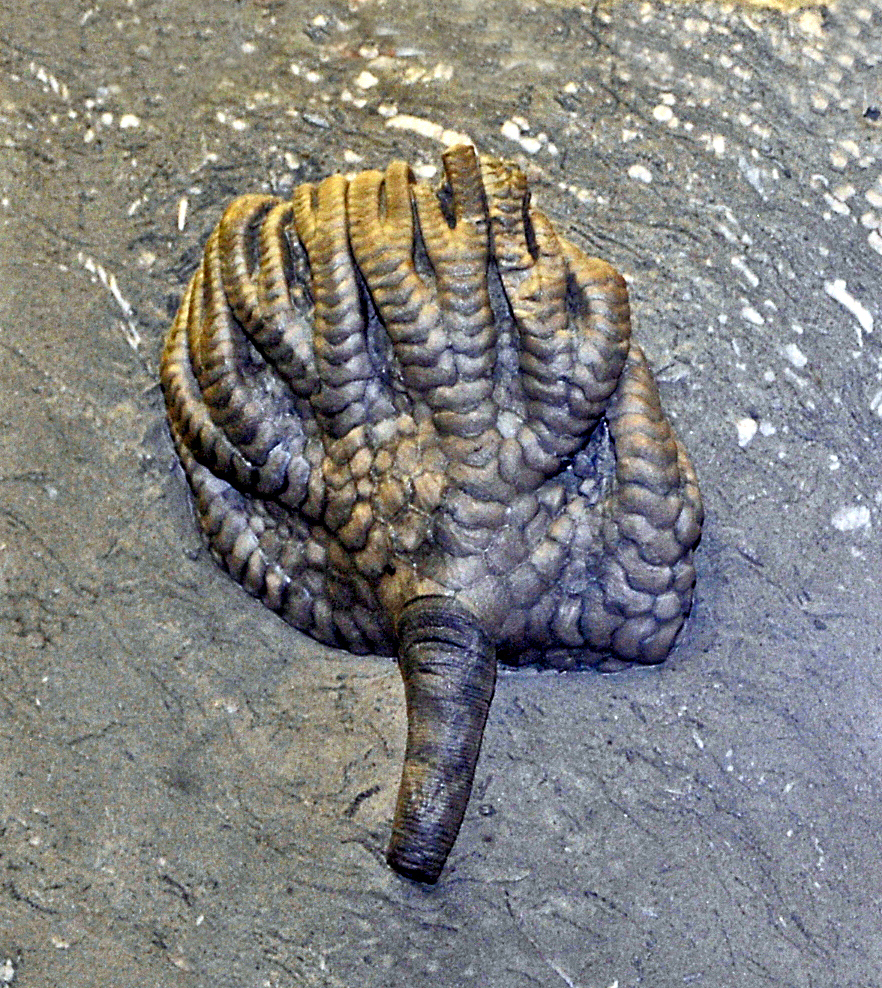
- Fossilized calyx of the Devonian-Carboniferous crinoid ("sea lily") Forbesiocrinus
  †Forbesiocrinus
  - †Forbesiocrinus multibrachiatus
  - †Forbesiocrinus wortheni
  - †Forbesiocrinus wortheri
- †Furcitella
  - †Furcitella scofieldi – or unidentified comparable form
- †Fusispira
  - †Fusispira sulcata

== G ==
- †Galtiera
  - †Galtiera bostonensis
- †Gastrioceras
  - †Gastrioceras magoffinense – type locality for species
- †Gaulocrinus
  - †Gaulocrinus bordeni
  - †Gaulocrinus symmetros – type locality for species
  - †Gaulocrinus trantscholdi
  - †Gaulocrinus veryi
- †Geniculograptus
  - †Geniculograptus typicalis
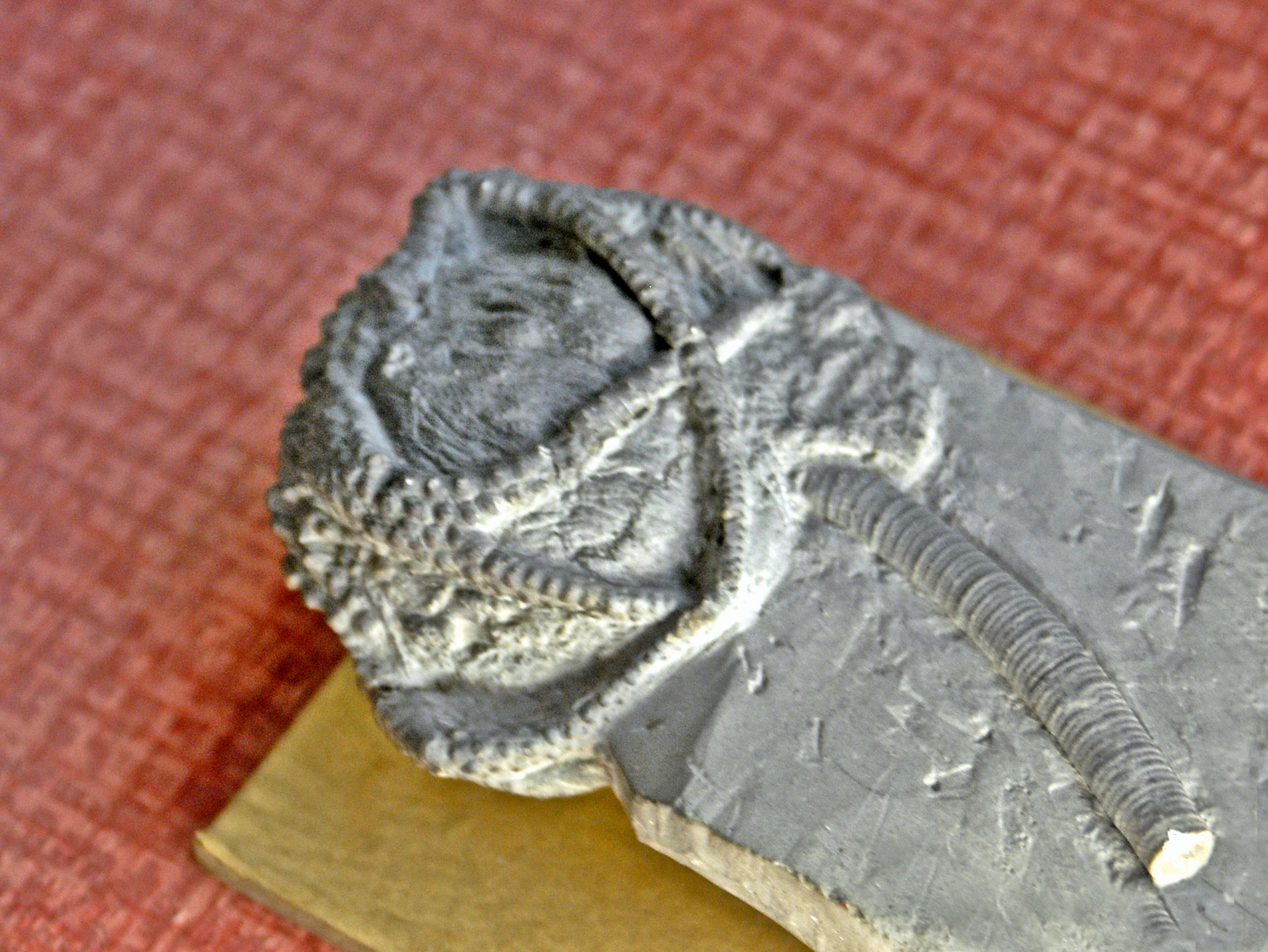
- Fossilized calyx and partial stem of the Devonian-Carboniferous crinoid ("sea lily") Gilbertsocrinus
  †Gilbertsocrinus
  - †Gilbertsocrinus tuberculosus – tentative report
  - †Gilbertsocrinus tuberosus
  - †Gilbertsocrinus typus – tentative report
- †Girtyella
  - †Girtyella brevilobata
  - †Girtyella turgida
- †Glabrocingulum
  - †Glabrocingulum ellenae – type locality for species
- †Globozyga
  - †Globozyga littonana
- †Globulocystites
- †Glossina
  - †Glossina nebraskensis
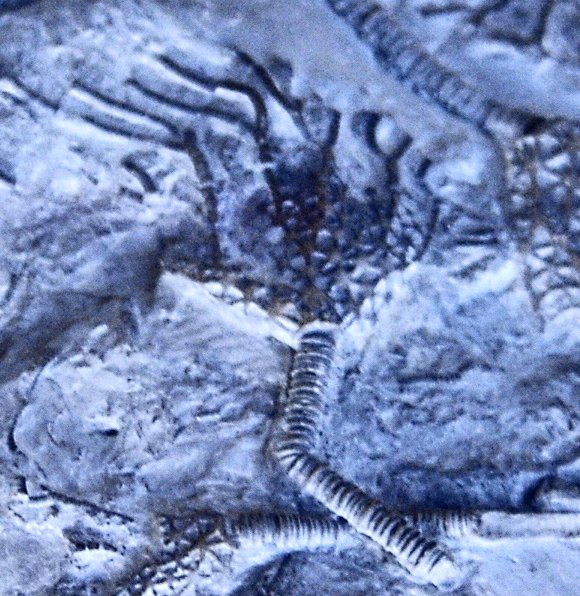
- Assemblage of fossils of the Middle Ordovician-Silurian crinoid ("sea lily") Glyptocrinus
  †Glyptocrinus
  - †Glyptocrinus nodosus
- †Glyptopleura
  - †Glyptopleura parvacostata
  - †Glyptopleura perbella
- †Glyptopora
  - †Glyptopora sagenella
- †Glyptorthis
  - †Glyptorthis insculpta
- †Gnathodus
  - †Gnathodus bulbosus
  - †Gnathodus pseudosemiglaber
  - †Gnathodus semiglaber
  - †Gnathodus texanus
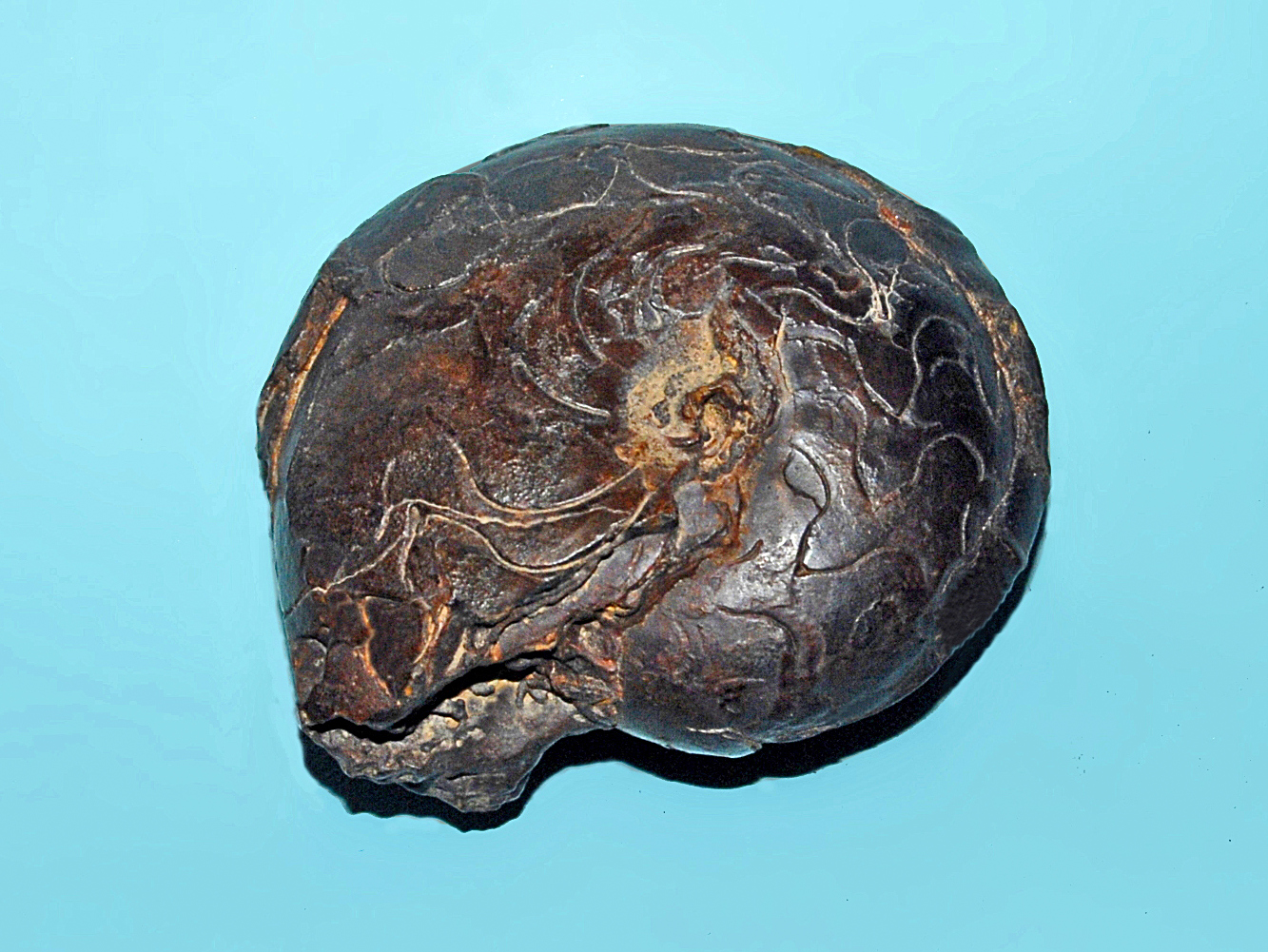
- Fossilized shell of the Late Devonian-Late Triassic ammonoid cephalopod Goniatites
  †Goniatites
- †Goniocyclus
- †Gorbyoceras
  - †Gorbyoceras tetreauense – or unidentified comparable form
- †Gordonaster
  - †Gordonaster brassfieldensis
- †Gosseletina
  - †Gosseletina johnsoni
  - †Gosseletina subglobosa
- †Grammysia – tentative report
- †Granasporites
  - †Granasporites medius
- †Granatocrinus
  - †Granatocrinus granulatus
- †Granulatisporites
  - †Granulatisporites granularis
  - †Granulatisporites granulatus
  - †Granulatisporites pallidus
  - †Granulatisporites verrucosus
- †Graptodictya
- †Gravicalymene
  - †Gravicalymene hagani
- †Grewingikia
  - †Grewingikia rustica
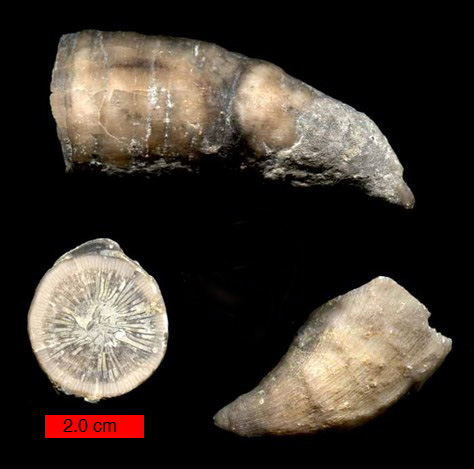
- Multiple views of a fossil of the Ordovician horn coral Grewingkia
  †Grewingkia
  - †Grewingkia rusticum
- †Grumosisporites
  - †Grumosisporites varioreticulatus
- †Gyronema
  - †Gyronema pulchellum

== H ==
- †Hadroblastus
- †Hallia
  - †Hallia strigata – tentative report
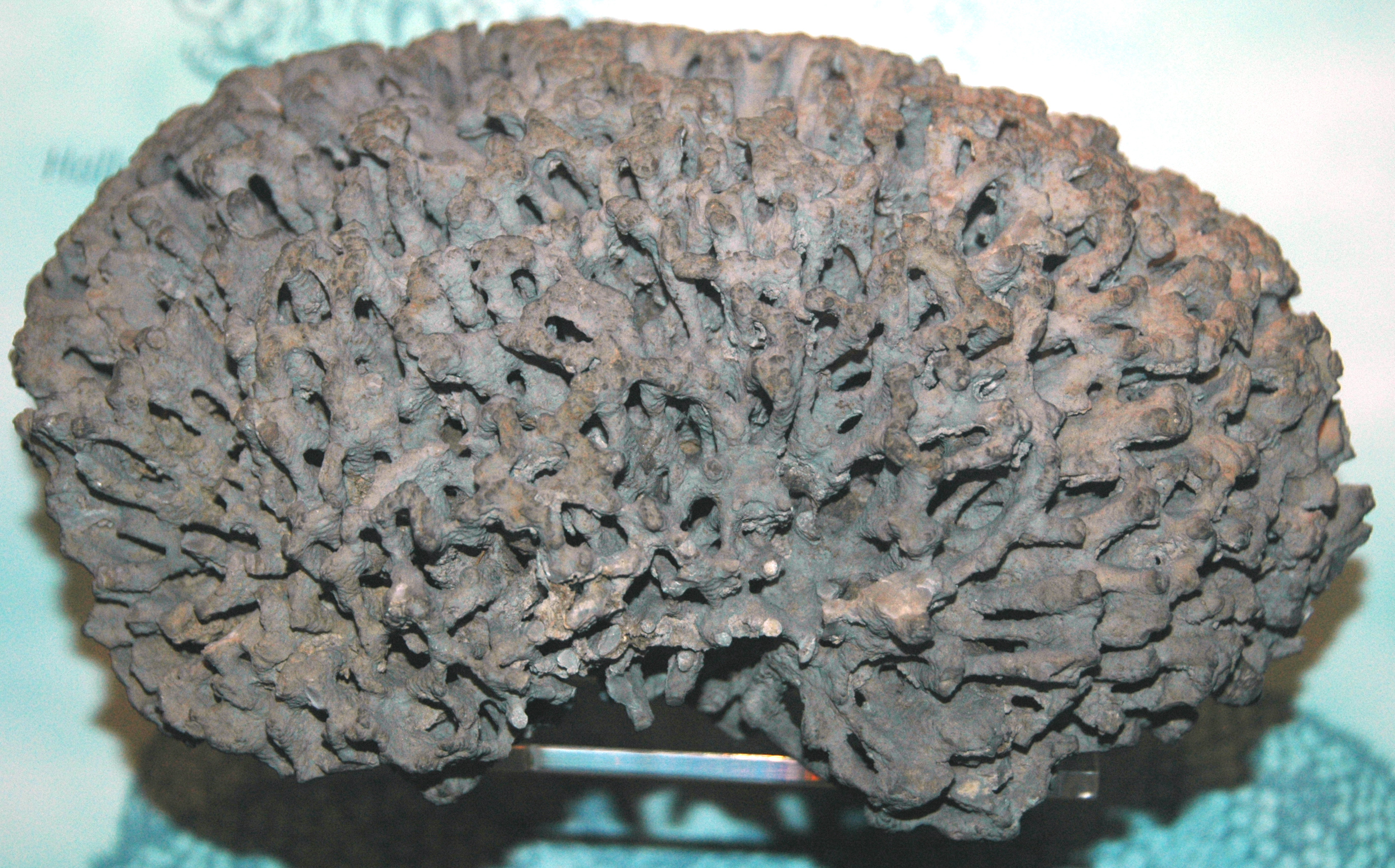
- Fossil of the Ordovician bryozoan ("moss animal") Hallopora
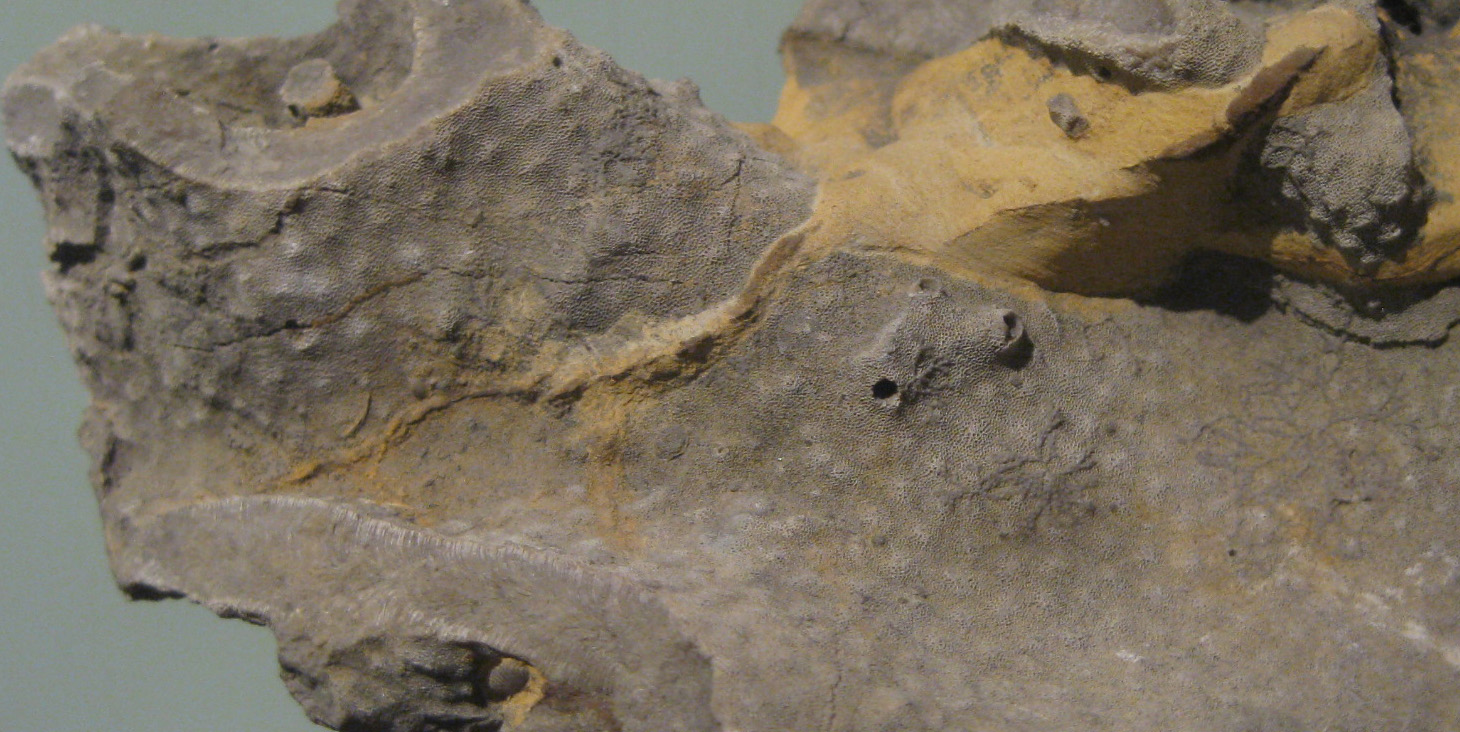
  Close-up photograph of a fossil of the Ordovician bryozoan ("moss animal") Hallopora
  †Hallopora
  - †Hallopora multitabulata
  - †Hallopora onealli
- †Halysiocrinus
  - †Halysiocrinus cumberlandensis
  - †Halysiocrinus dactylus
  - †Halysiocrinus tunicatus
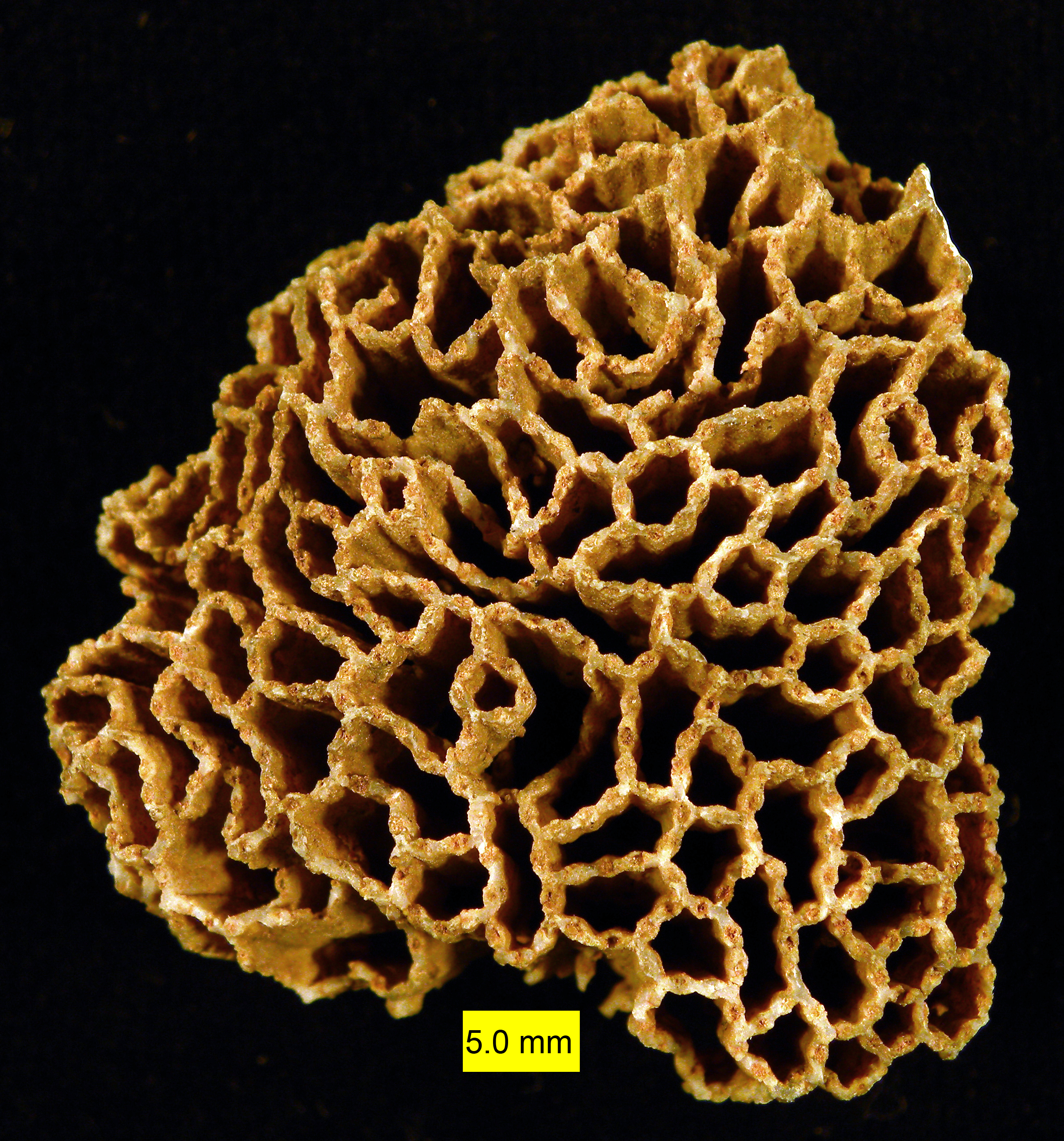
- Fossil of the Ordovician-Silurian tabulate coral Halysites
  †Halysites
  - †Halysites louisvillensis – type locality for species
  - †Halysites meandrinus – tentative report
  - †Halysites nitidus
- †Haplistion
  - †Haplistion armstrongi
- †Hapsiphyllum
  - †Hapsiphyllum cassedayi
  - †Hapsiphyllum cassedeyi
- †Hebertella
  - †Hebertella alveolata
  - †Hebertella frankfortensis
  - †Hebertella occidentalis
  - †Hebertella parkensis
  - †Hebertella parksensis
  - †Hebertella sinuata
- †Helicelasma
  - †Helicelasma rusticum
- †Helicotoma
  - †Helicotoma planulatoides – type locality for species
- †Heliolites
  - †Heliolites megastoma
  - †Heliolites romingeri
  - †Heliolites spongiosus
  - †Heliolites spongodes
  - †Heliolites subtubulatus
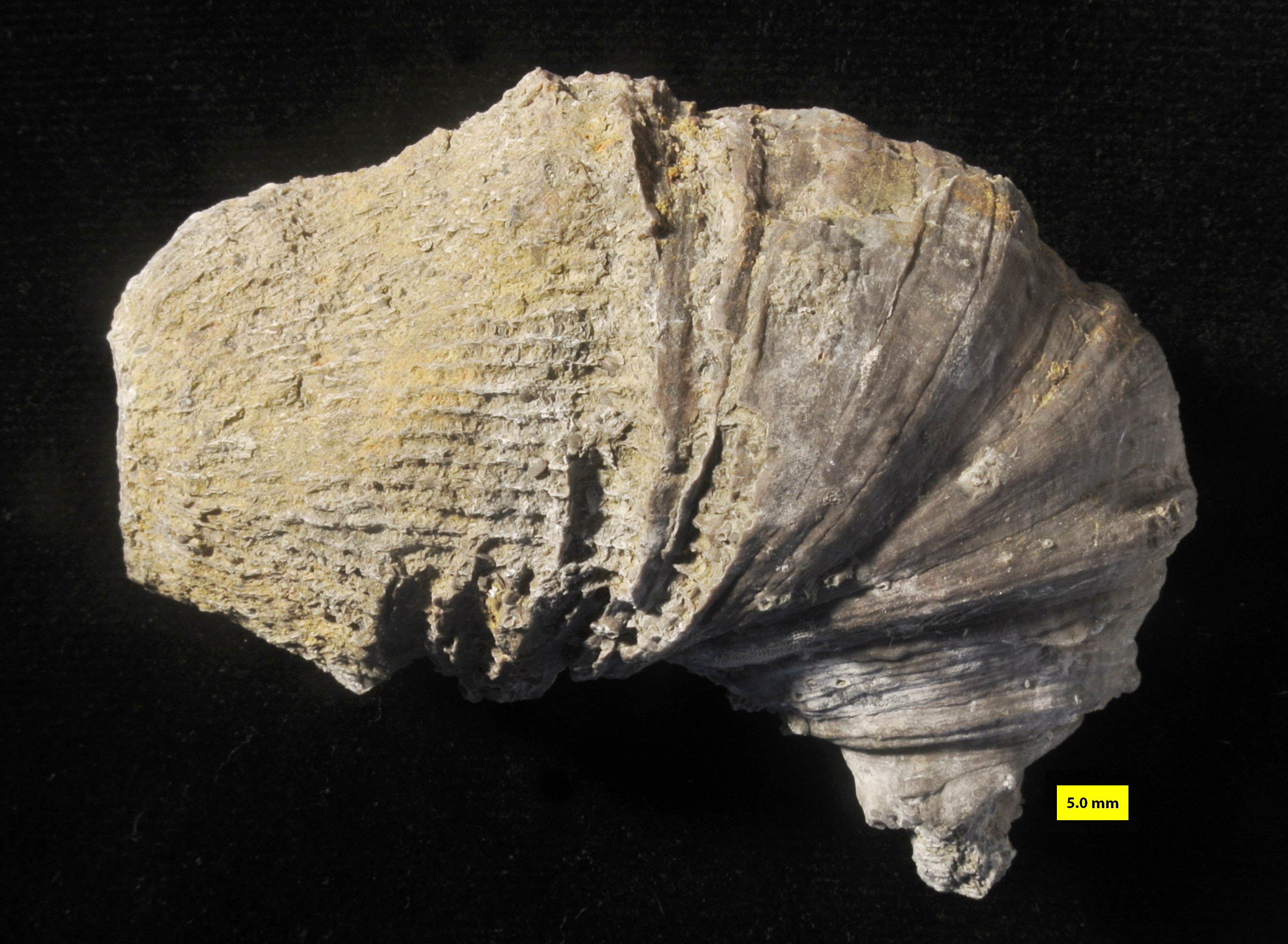
- Fossil of the Middle Devonian horn coral Heliophyllum
  †Heliophyllum
  - †Heliophyllum alternatum
  - †Heliophyllum ethelanum
  - †Heliophyllum gurleyi
  - †Heliophyllum halli
  - †Heliophyllum infundibulum
  - †Heliophyllum insigne
  - †Heliophyllum tenuiseptatum
- †Helminthochiton
  - †Helminthochiton blacki
- †Hemiphragma
  - †Hemiphragma tenuimurale – or unidentified comparable form
- †Hemitrypa
- †Hesperorthis
  - †Hesperorthis tricenaria
- †Heterophrentis
  - †Heterophrentis concava
  - †Heterophrentis foliata
  - †Heterophrentis simplex
  - †Heterophrentis subcompressa
- †Heterorthina
  - †Heterorthina macfarlani
- †Heterotrypa
  - †Heterotrypa frondosa – or unidentified comparable form
  - †Heterotrypa trentonensis
- †Hierogramma
  - †Hierogramma jeffreyi
- †Hindia
  - †Hindia parva
- †Hippocardia
- †Hiscobeccus
  - †Hiscobeccus capax
- †Histocrinus
  - †Histocrinus coreyi
  - †Histocrinus stellatus – tentative report
- †Hoareicardia
  - †Hoareicardia cunea
- †Holcocrinus
  - †Holcocrinus nodobrachiatus
  - †Holcocrinus spinobrachiatus
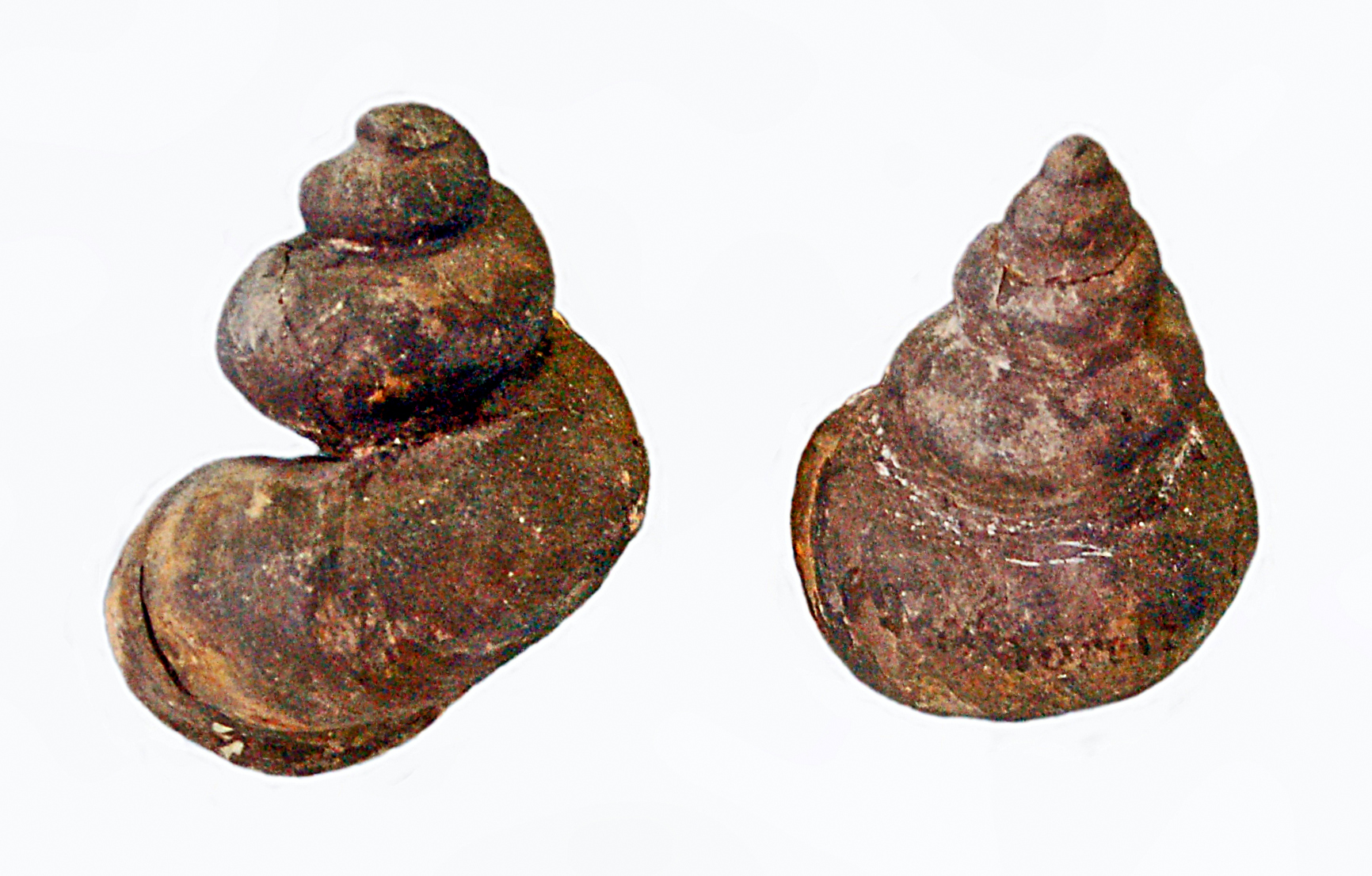
- Fossilized shells of the Ordovician-Carboniferous sea snail Holopea
  †Holopea
  - †Holopea insignis
  - †Holopea parvula – or unidentified comparable form
- †Holtedahlina
  - †Holtedahlina sulcata
- †Homaloneura – type locality for genus
  - †Homaloneura redbirdi – type locality for species
- †Homotelus
- †Homotrypa
  - †Homotrypa callosa
  - †Homotrypa similis
- †Hormotoma
  - †Hormotoma gracilis
- †Hudsonospongia
- †Hustedia
  - †Hustedia miseri – or unidentified comparable form
  - †Hustedia mormoni – or unidentified comparable form
- †Hybocrinus
  - †Hybocrinus tumidus
- †Hybocystites
  - †Hybocystites problematicus
- †Hylodecrinus
  - †Hylodecrinus asper
  - †Hylodecrinus bonoensis
  - †Hylodecrinus briareus – tentative report
  - †Hylodecrinus sculptus

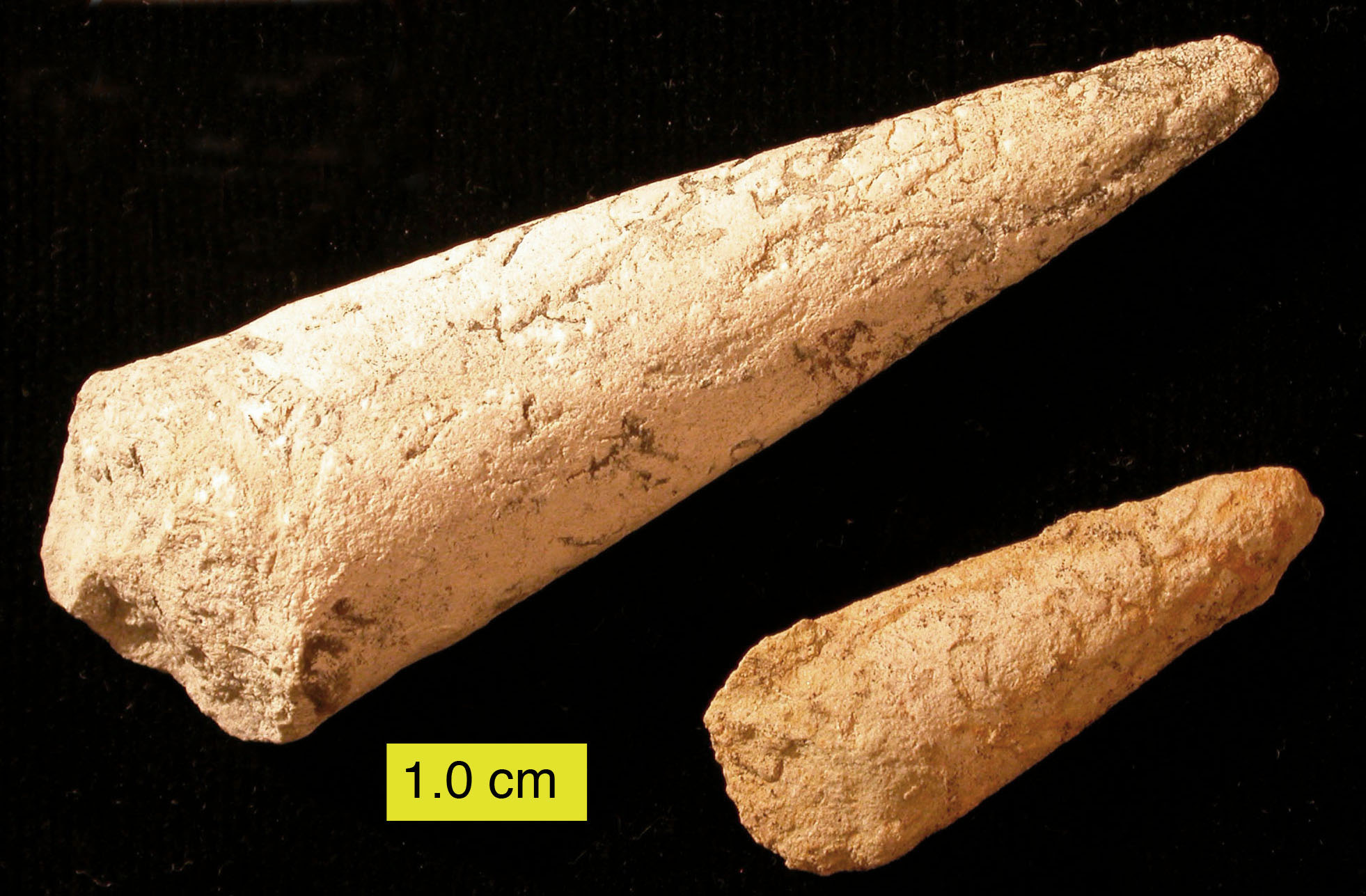
Fossilized shells of the Cambrian-Permian brachiopod relative Hyolitha

†Hyolithes

  - †Hyolithes parviuscula
- †Hypergonia
  - †Hypergonia marvinwelleri
- †Hypselocrinus
  - †Hypselocrinus campanulus
  - †Hypselocrinus hoveyi

== I ==
- †Ianthinopsis
  - †Ianthinopsis medialis
- †Idiognathoides
  - †Idiognathoides ouachitensis
  - †Idiognathoides sinuatus
  - †Idiognathoides tuberculatus
- †Imitoceras
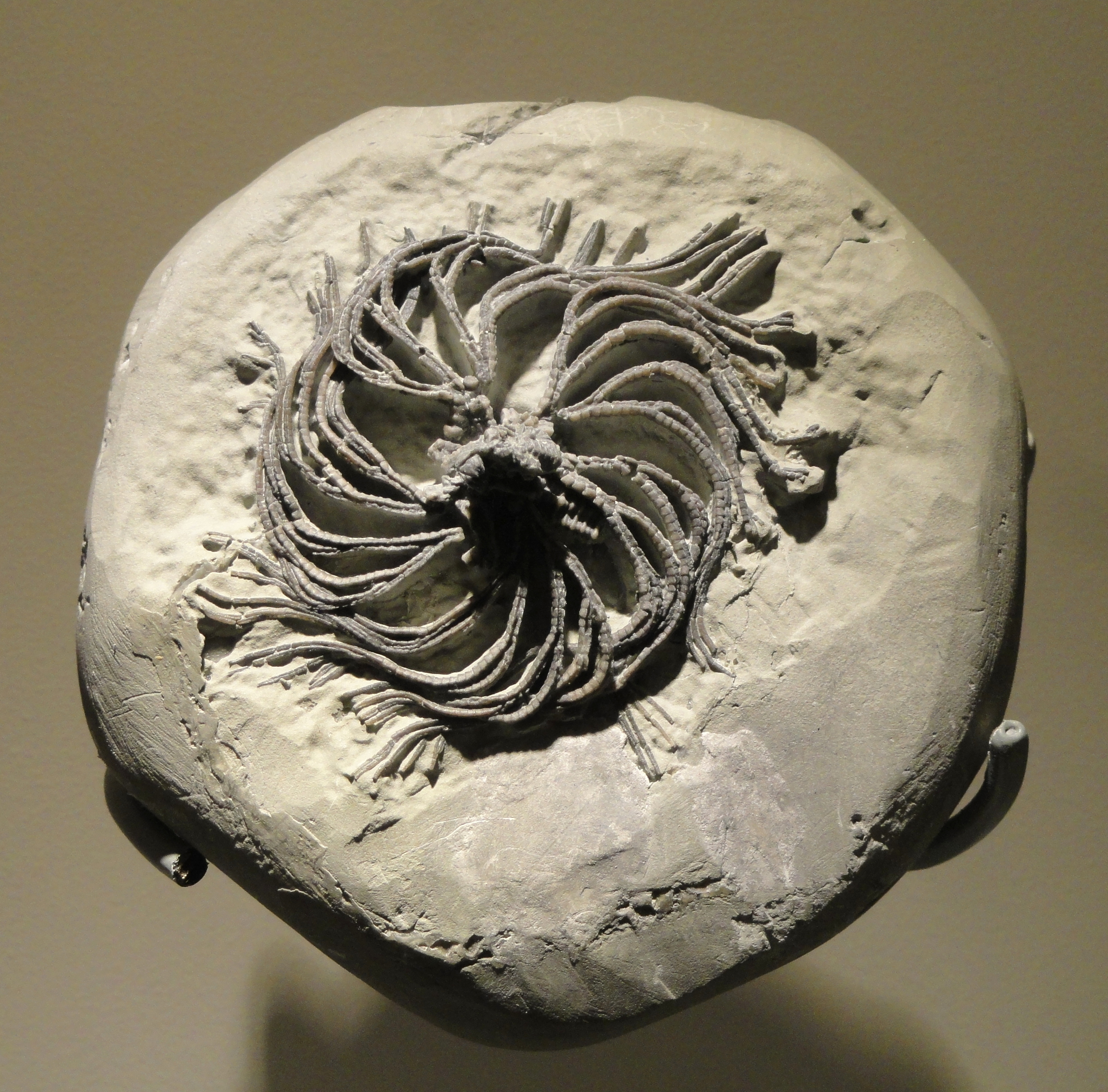
- Fossil of the Ordovician crinoid ("sea lily") Iocrinus
  †Iocrinus
- †Ischyrodonta
  - †Ischyrodonta elongata – tentative report
  - †Ischyrodonta modioliformis
- †Isochilina
  - †Isochilina ampla – or unidentified comparable form
- †Isorophus
  - †Isorophus cincinnatiensis
- †Isorthoceras
  - †Isorthoceras albersi – type locality for species
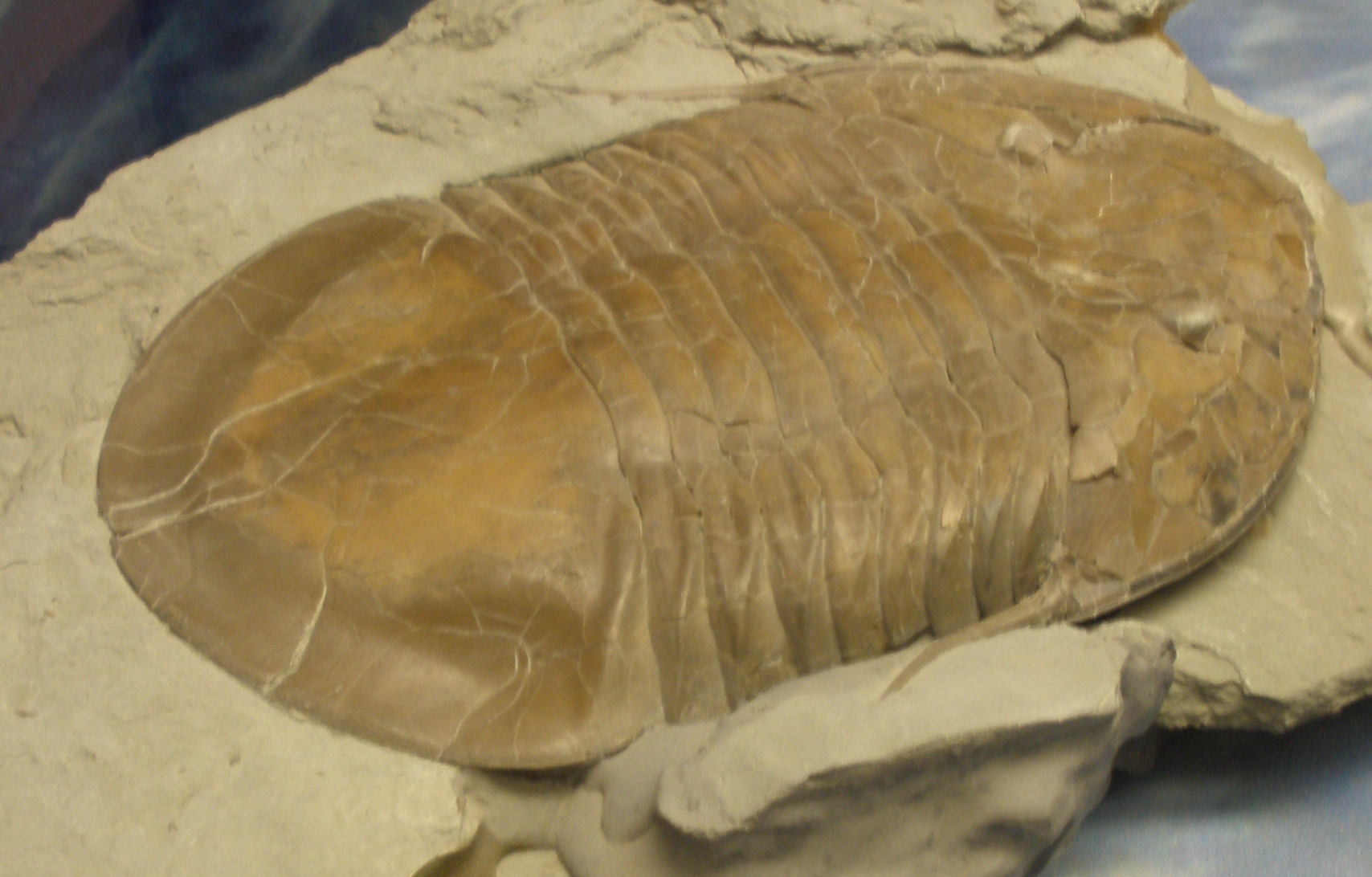
- Fossil of the Middle-Late Ordovician giant trilobite Isotelus.
  †Isotelus
  - †Isotelus gigas
  - †Isotelus maximus

== J ==
- †Jonesella
  - †Jonesella crepidiformis
  - †Jonesella obscura – or unidentified related form

== K ==
- †Kalymma
  - †Kalymma auriculata
  - †Kalymma grandis
  - †Kalymma hippocrepis
  - †Kalymma lirata
  - †Kalymma minuta
  - †Kalymma resinosa
- †Kaskia
  - †Kaskia chesterensis
- †Kazakhstania
  - †Kazakhstania colubrella
  - †Kazakhstania mangeri
- †Ketophyllum
  - †Ketophyllum intertrium
- †Kinkaidia – type locality for genus
  - †Kinkaidia cancellata – type locality for species
- †Kirkbya
- †Kodonophyllum
  - †Kodonophyllum vadum
- †Krausella

== L ==
- †Labechia
  - †Labechia huronensis
- †Laccoprimitia
  - †Laccoprimitia centralis
- †Lambeophyllum – tentative report
- †Lamprophyllum
  - †Lamprophyllum niagarense
- †Lanecrinus
  - †Lanecrinus depressus
  - †Lanecrinus repertus
- †Lanthanaster
  - †Lanthanaster intermedius
- †Laphamoceras
  - †Laphamoceras scofieldi – or unidentified comparable form
- †Lecocrinus
  - †Lecocrinus springeri
- †Lekocrinus
  - †Lekocrinus planibrachiatus
- †Leperditella
  - †Leperditella glabra
- †Leperditia
  - †Leperditia caecigena
- †Lepidocoleus
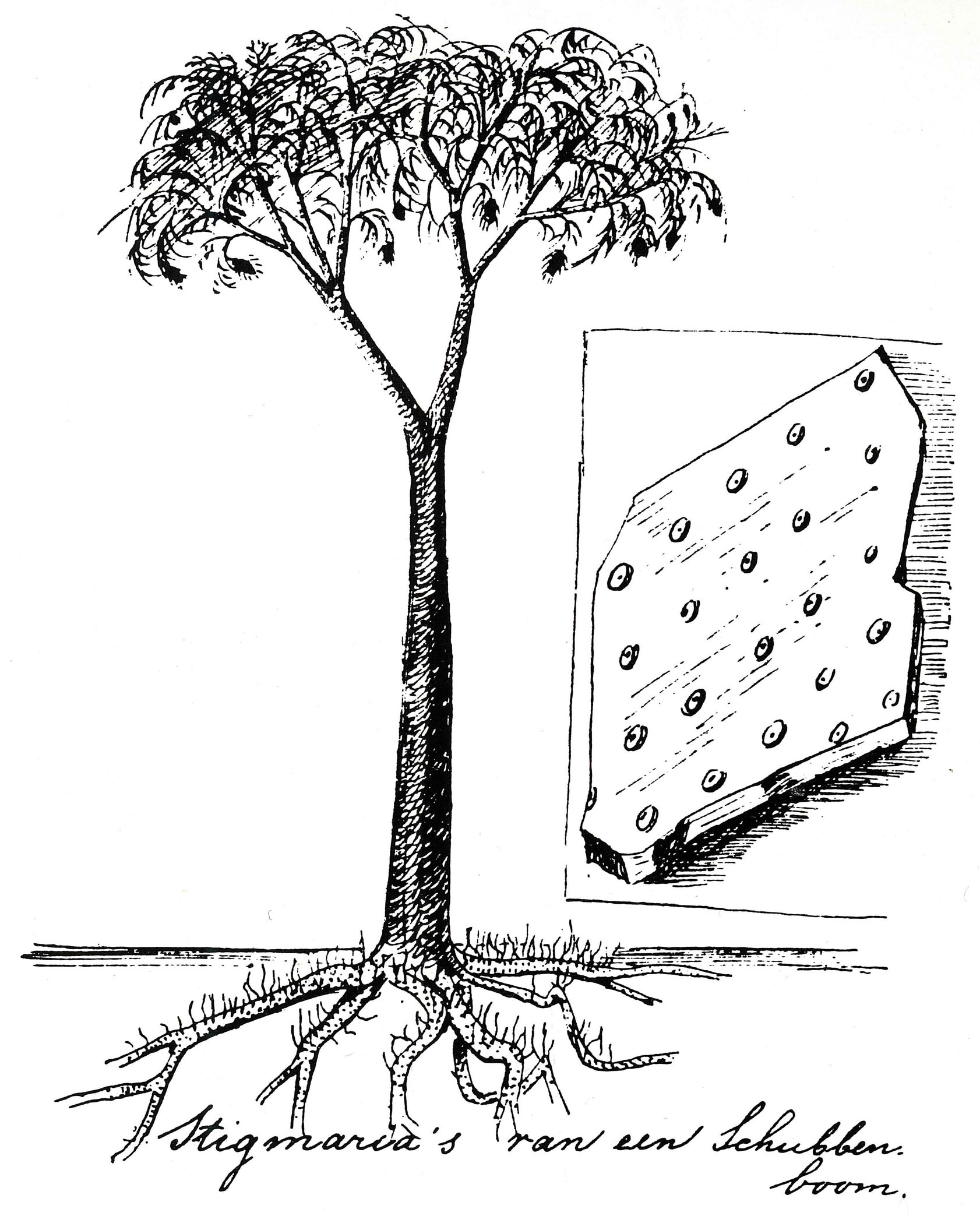
- Restoration of the Carboniferous-Late Triassic club moss relative Lepidodendron. Eli Heimans (1911).
  †Lepidodendron
  - †Lepidodendron aculeatum – or unidentified comparable form
  - †Lepidodendron baylense
  - †Lepidodendron boylensis
  - †Lepidodendron noralbaniense
  - †Lepidodendron volkmannianum
- †Lepidophylloides
  - †Lepidophylloides longifolium
- †Lepidostrobophyllum
  - †Lepidostrobophyllum lanceolatum
- †Lepidostrobus
  - †Lepidostrobus fisheri
  - †Lepidostrobus kentuckiensis
  - †Lepidostrobus ornatus – tentative report
  - †Lepidostrobus shopfii – type locality for species
- †Leptaena
  - †Leptaena gibbosa
  - †Leptaena kentuckiana – type locality for species
  - †Leptaena richmondensis
- †Levizygopleura
  - †Levizygopleura inornata
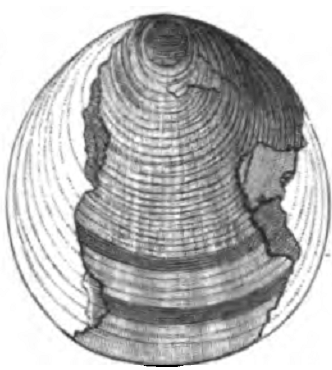
- Illustration of a fossilized shell of the Cambrian-Late Ordovician brachiopod Lingulella
  †Lingulella
- †Linoproductus
  - †Linoproductus cora
- †Liospira
  - †Liospira decipens
  - †Liospira micula
  - †Liospira progne
  - †Liospira vitruvia
- †Liroceras
- †Listrochiton – type locality for genus
  - †Listrochiton weiri – type locality for species
- Lithophaga – tentative report
- †Litostrobus
  - †Litostrobus iowensis – or unidentified comparable form
- †Lophophyllidium
  - †Lophophyllidium proliferum
- †Lophospira
  - †Lophospira abnormis
  - †Lophospira decursa – or unidentified comparable form
  - †Lophospira milleri
  - †Lophospira obliqua
  - †Lophospira perangulata
  - †Lophospira type locality for species A – informal
- †Lophotriletes
  - †Lophotriletes gibbosus
- †Loxobucania
  - †Loxobucania lindsleyi – type locality for species
  - †Loxobucania nashvillensis
  - †Loxobucania singularis – type locality for species
- †Loxonema
  - †Loxonema nitida
- †Loxoplocus
- †Lycopogenia
  - †Lycopogenia callicyrta
- †Lycospora
  - †Lycospora granulata
  - †Lycospora micropapillata
  - †Lycospora pellucida
  - †Lycospora pusilla
  - †Lycospora rotunda
  - †Lycospora subjuga
- †Lyrodesma
  - †Lyrodesma acuminatum – or unidentified comparable form
  - †Lyrodesma inornatum – tentative report

== M ==
- †Maclurites
- †Macrocrinus
  - †Macrocrinus konincki
  - †Macrocrinus mundulus
  - †Macrocrinus verneuillianus
- †Macurdablastus
  - †Macurdablastus uniplicatus
- †Maelonoceras
  - †Maelonoceras praematurum – or unidentified comparable form
- †Magnuscrinus
  - †Magnuscrinus kammeri
  - †Magnuscrinus praegravis
- †Marginatia
- †Marginicinctus
- †Marginifera
- †Mariopteris
  - †Mariopteris nervosa
- †Masonoceras – type locality for genus
  - †Masonoceras kentuckiense – type locality for species
- †Maximites
  - †Maximites nassichuki – type locality for species
- †Meekopora
  - †Meekopora eximia
- †Meekospira
  - †Meekospira evansvillensis
  - †Meekospira minuta
  - †Meekospira mississippiensis
  - †Meekospira peracuta
- †Megalaspidae – tentative report
  - †Megalaspidae pygidium – informal
- †Megalomphala
  - †Megalomphala crassa
- †Meniscocrinus
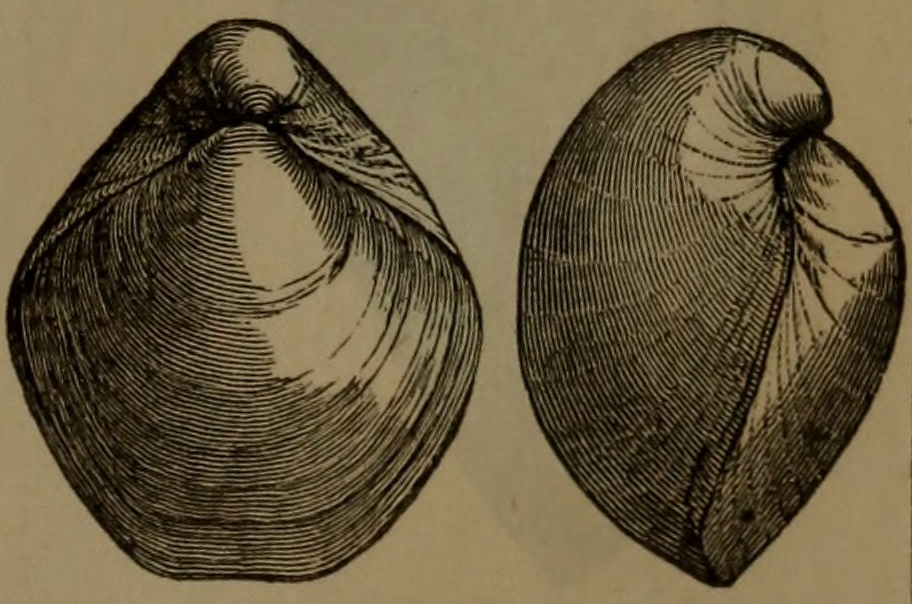
- Illustration (lower right, entry 15) of a fossilized shell in front and side views of the Silurian-Late Devonian brachiopod Meristella
  †Meristella
  - †Meristella nasuta
- †Meristina – tentative report
- †Meristoschisma
  - †Meristoschisma hudsoni
- †Merocanites
- †Merocrinus
- †Mesocyridira
  - †Mesocyridira flagrocosta
  - †Mesocyridira washingtonensis
- †Mesopalaeaster
  - †Mesopalaeaster finei
- †Mesopilocrinus – tentative report
  - †Mesopilocrinus romingeri
- †Mesotrypa
- †Mespilocrinus
  - †Mespilocrinus kentuckyensis – type locality for species
  - †Mespilocrinus myllos
  - †Mespilocrinus romingeri
- †Metablastus
  - †Metablastus bipyramidalis
  - †Metablastus wortheni
- †Metacromyocrinus
  - †Metacromyocrinus oklahomenisis
- †Metichthyocrinus
  - †Metichthyocrinus clarkensis
  - †Metichthyocrinus tiaraeformis
- †Michelinia
- †Michelinoceras
- †Micnoceras – or unidentified comparable form
- †Microceras – tentative report
- †Micromphalus – type locality for genus
  - †Micromphalus turris – type locality for species
- †Micropileus
  - †Micropileus variabilis
- †Microzygia
  - †Microzygia lacunosa
- †Milleratia
  - †Milleratia shideleri – or unidentified related form
- †Mimella
- †Mitrospermum
  - †Mitrospermum compressum
- †Modiolodon
  - †Modiolodon oviformis
- †Modiolopsis
  - †Modiolopsis modiolaris
- †Monomuchites
  - †Monomuchites annularis – type locality for species
  - †Monomuchites costalis – or unidentified comparable form
  - †Monomuchites obliquum – type locality for species
- †Monticulipora
- †Mourlonia
- †Muensteroceras
  - †Muensteroceras oweni
- †Murchisonia
- †Murinella – tentative report
- †Murrayoceras
  - †Murrayoceras murrayi – or unidentified comparable form

== N ==
- †Nannillaneus
- †Neoicoceras
  - †Neoicoceras elkhornense – type locality for species
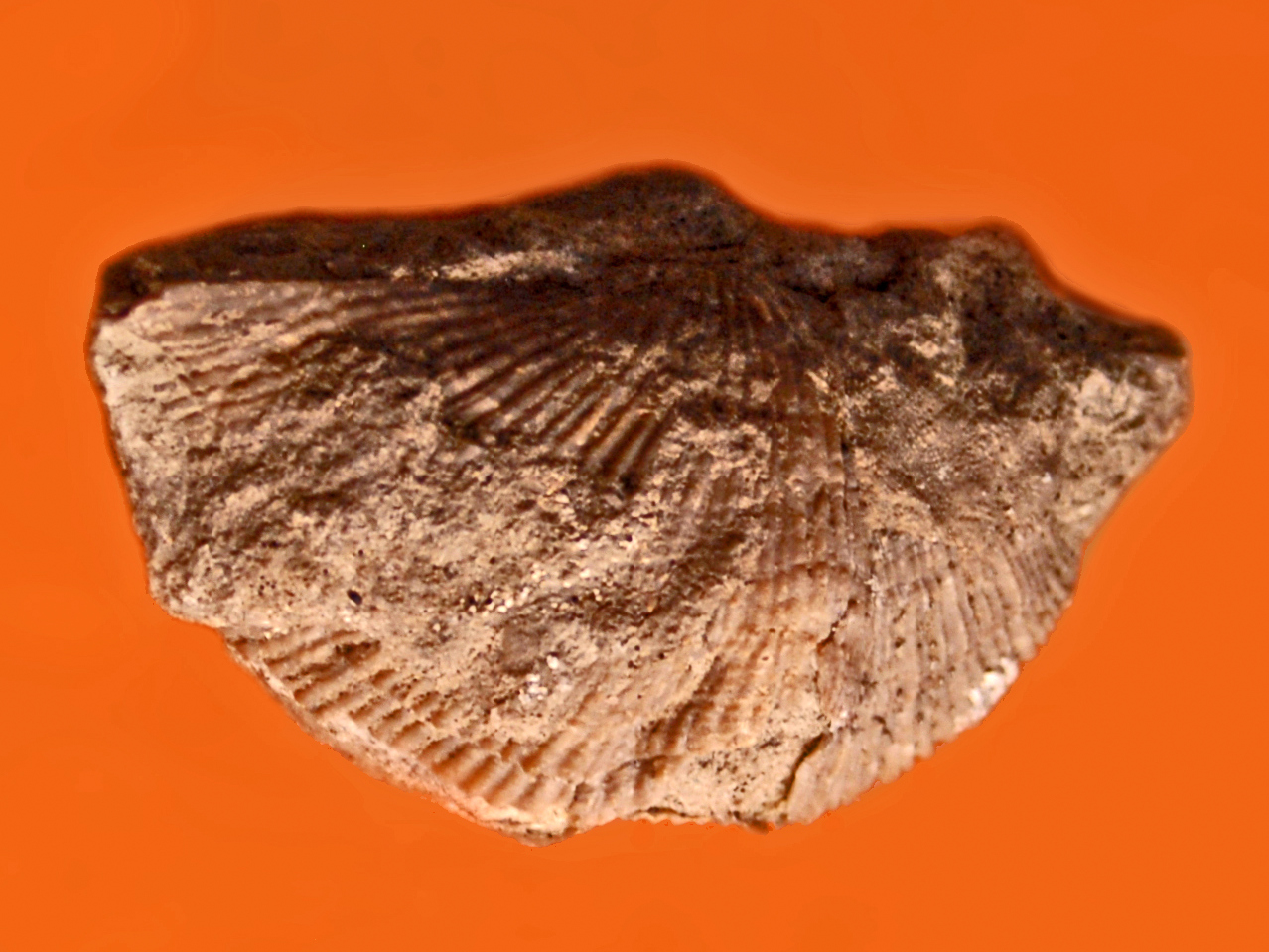
- Fossilized shell of the Carboniferous-Permian brachiopod Neospirifer
  †Neospirifer
  - †Neospirifer cameratus
- †Neozaphrentis
- †Neuropteris
  - †Neuropteris gigantea
  - †Neuropteris heterophylla
  - †Neuropteris tenuifolia – or unidentified comparable form
- †Nipterocrinus
  - †Nipterocrinus monroensis
- †Nucleospira – tentative report
- Nuculana
  - †Nuculana belliostriata
- †Nucularca
  - †Nucularca cingulata
  - †Nucularca pectunculoides – or unidentified related form
- †Nuculites
  - †Nuculites fabula
- †Nuculopsis
  - †Nuculopsis girtyi
  - †Nuculopsis subrotunda
- †Nyctopora – tentative report

== O ==
- †Octonaria
  - †Octonaria bicava
- †Odontophyllum
  - †Odontophyllum convergens
  - †Odontophyllum patellatum
  - †Odontophyllum tornatum
- †Oepikina
  - †Oepikina minnesotensis
- †Oliganisus
- †Oncoceras
  - †Oncoceras major – type locality for species
  - †Oncoceras multicameratum
- †Onniella
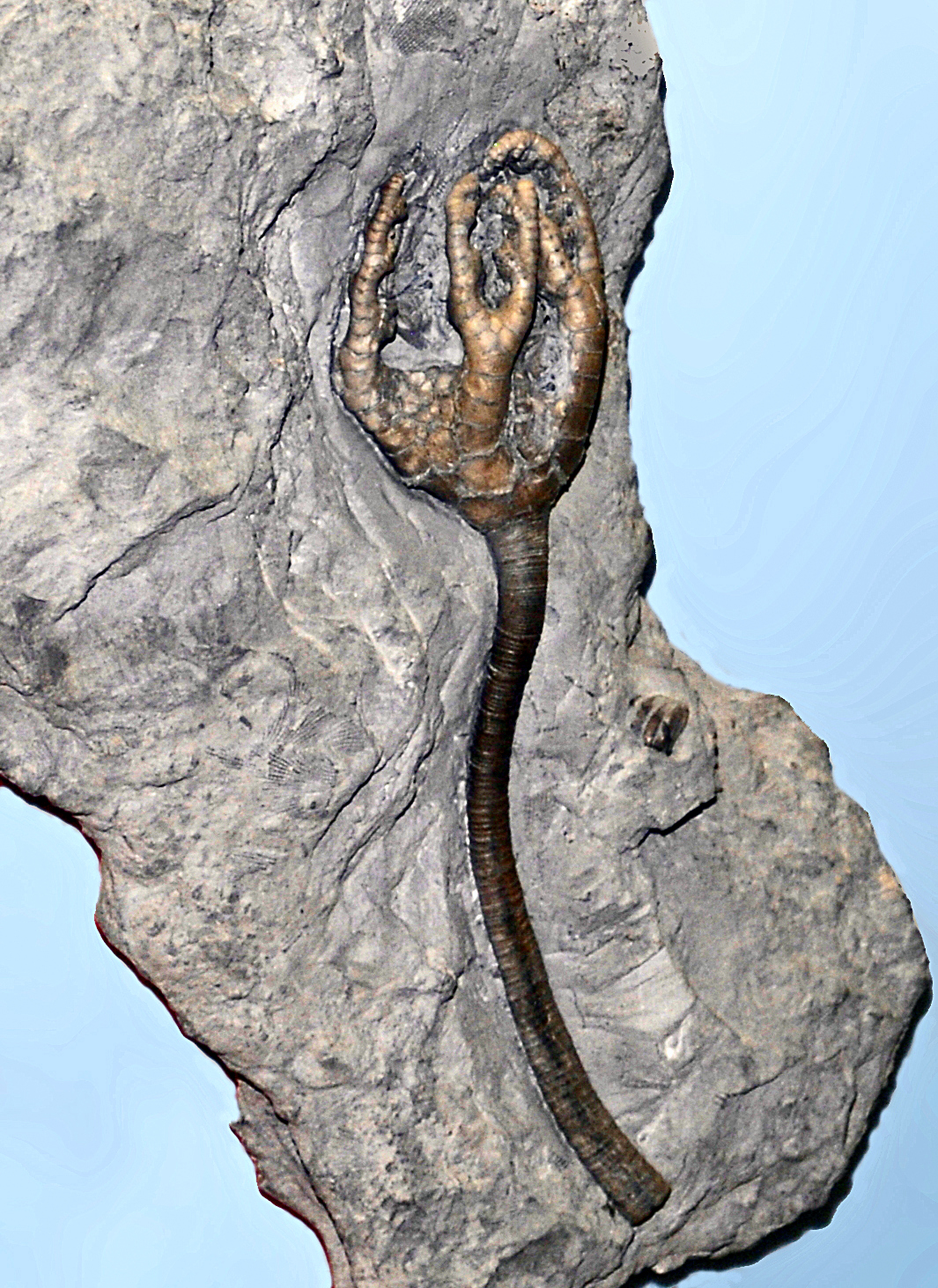
- Fossil of the Carboniferous crinoid ("sea lily") Onychocrinus
  †Onychocrinus
  - †Onychocrinus grandis – type locality for species
  - †Onychocrinus pulaskiensis
- †Orbiculoidea
  - †Orbiculoidea convexa
  - †Orbiculoidea manhattensis
- †Orbitremites
  - †Orbitremites coralridgensis – type locality for species
  - †Orbitremites kentuckyensis – type locality for species
  - †Orbitremites oppelti
- †Ordogeisonoceras
  - †Ordogeisonoceras amplicameratum – type locality for species
- †Ormoceras
  - †Ormoceras ferecentricum – type locality for species
- †Orthis
  - †Orthis testudinaria
- †Orthoceras
- †Orthodesma
- †Orthonybyoceras
- †Orthonychia
  - †Orthonychia chesterense
- †Orthorhynchula
  - †Orthorhynchula linneyi
  - †Orthorhynchula sublinneyi
- †Orthotetes
- †Ovatia

== P ==
- †Pachydictya
- †Pachyglossella
- †Pachylocrinus
  - †Pachylocrinus aequalis
- †Palaeacis
  - †Palaeacis cuniformis
- †Palaeocapulus
  - †Palaeocapulus acutirostre
- †Palaeocaudina
  - †Palaeocaudina kansasensis
- †Palaeoconcha
  - †Palaeoconcha obliqua
- †Palaeocrinus
  - †Palaeocrinus avondalensis
  - †Palaeocrinus planobasalis
- †Palaeoneila
- †Palaeoneilo
  - †Palaeoneilo socialis
- †Palaeopteria
  - †Palaeopteria parvula – or unidentified related form
- †Palaeostylus – tentative report
- †Palaeozygopleura
  - †Palaeozygopleura delphicola
- †Paleofavosites
  - †Paleofavosites prolificus
- †Paracyrtolites
  - †Paracyrtolites parvus – type locality for species
  - †Paracyrtolites subplanus
- †Paradichocrinus
  - †Paradichocrinus liratus
  - †Paradichocrinus planus
  - †Paradichocrinus polydactylus
  - †Paradichocrinus ramus
  - †Paradichocrinus sculptus
- †Paragassizocrinus
  - †Paragassizocrinus disculus – or unidentified comparable form
  - †Paragassizocrinus kendrickensis
  - †Paragassizocrinus turris – or unidentified comparable form
- †Paraliospira – tentative report
  - †Paraliospira mundula – type locality for species
- †Paraparchites
  - †Paraparchites subcircularis
- †Parascytalocrinus
  - †Parascytalocrinus hamiltonensis
  - †Parascytalocrinus pentagonus
- †Parisocrinus – tentative report
- †Parvohallopora
  - †Parvohallopora onealli
  - †Parvohallopora ramosa
- †Patellilabia
  - †Patellilabia chesterensis
- †Patellostium
- †Pattersonia
  - †Pattersonia aurita
  - †Pattersonia tuberosa
- †Paupospira
  - †Paupospira bowdeni
  - †Paupospira burginensis
  - †Paupospira oweni
  - †Paupospira sumnerensis
  - †Paupospira tenuistriata
  - †Paupospira tropidophora
- †Pecopteris
  - †Pecopteris plumosa – or unidentified comparable form
- †Pelecocrinus
  - †Pelecocrinus type locality for species – informal
- †Pellecrinus
  - †Pellecrinus obuncus
- †Pentagonia
  - †Pentagonia biplicata
- †Pentamerus
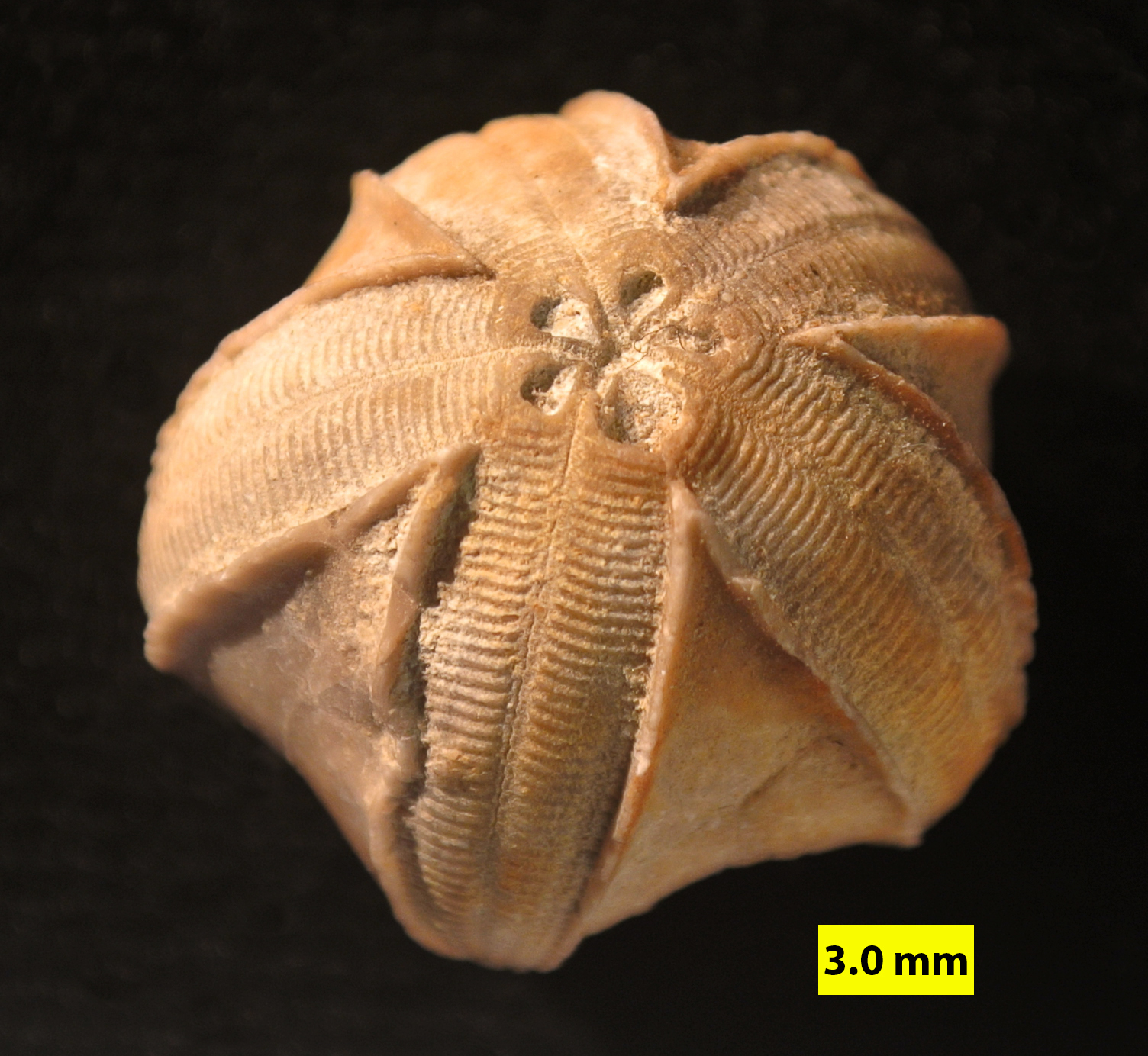
- Fossilized theca of the Carboniferous blastoid echinoderm ("sea bud") Pentremites
  †Pentremites
  - †Pentremites abruptus
  - †Pentremites clavatus
  - †Pentremites conoideus
  - †Pentremites elegans
  - †Pentremites girtyi
  - †Pentremites godoni
  - †Pentremites halli
  - †Pentremites okawensis
  - †Pentremites platybasis
  - †Pentremites princetonensis – or unidentified comparable form
  - †Pentremites pyramidatus
  - †Pentremites pyriformis
  - †Pentremites spicatus
  - †Pentremites springeri
  - †Pentremites symmetricus
  - †Pentremites tulipaformis
  - †Pentremites tulipiaformis
  - †Pentremites welleri
- †Perditocardinia
  - †Perditocardinia dubia
- †Periastron
  - †Periastron perforatum
  - †Periastron reticulatum
  - †Periastron reticulum
- †Pericyclus
- †Peripristis
  - †Peripristis semicircularis
- †Permophorus
- †Peronopora
  - †Peronopora decipiens – or unidentified comparable form
  - †Peronopora granulifera – or unidentified comparable form
  - †Peronopora milleri
- †Petrocrania
  - †Petrocrania scabiosa
- †Petropegia
  - †Petropegia radiata – type locality for species
  - †Petropegia spinosa – type locality for species
- †Phaneroceras
  - †Phaneroceras chesnuti – type locality for species
- †Phanocrinus
  - †Phanocrinus parvaramus
- †Phestia
  - †Phestia prolongata
- †Phillibole
- †Phillipsia
  - †Phillipsia bufo
- †Phragmolites
  - †Phragmolites bellulus – type locality for species
  - †Phragmolites compressus – type locality for species
- †Phymatophyllum
  - †Phymatophyllum nanum
- †Phytokneme
  - †Phytokneme rhodona
- †Pietzschia
  - †Pietzschia polyupsilon
- †Pionodema
  - †Pionodema rectimarginata
- †Pionomena
  - †Pionomena recens
- †Pithodea
  - †Pithodea americana
- †Pitys
  - †Pitys brownii
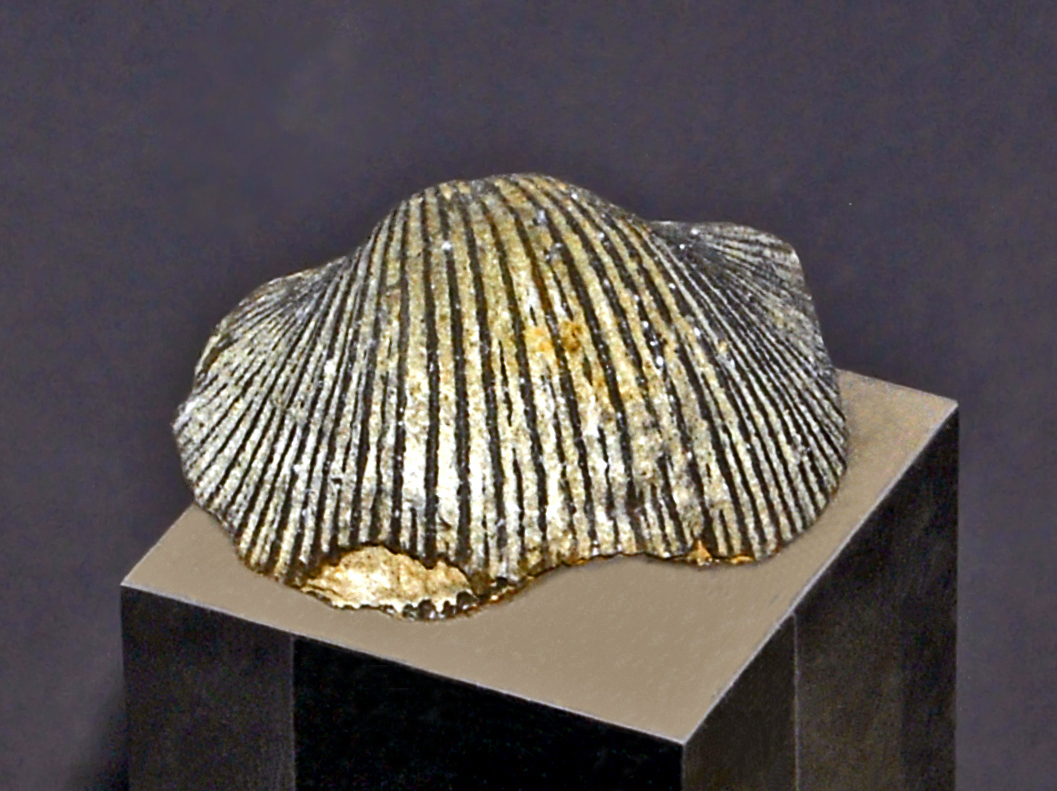
- Fossilized shell of the Ordovician brachiopod Plaesiomys
  †Plaesiomys
  - †Plaesiomys subquadrata
  - †Plaesiomys subquatra
- †Planalvus
  - †Planalvus densa
- †Planisporites
  - †Planisporites granifer
- †Planoendothyra
  - †Planoendothyra whitesidei – or unidentified comparable form
- †Plasmopora
  - †Plasmopora elegans
  - †Plasmopora follis
- †Platyaxum
  - †Platyaxum foliatum
  - †Platyaxum frondosum
  - †Platyaxum orthosoleniskum
  - †Platyaxum undosum
- †Platyceras
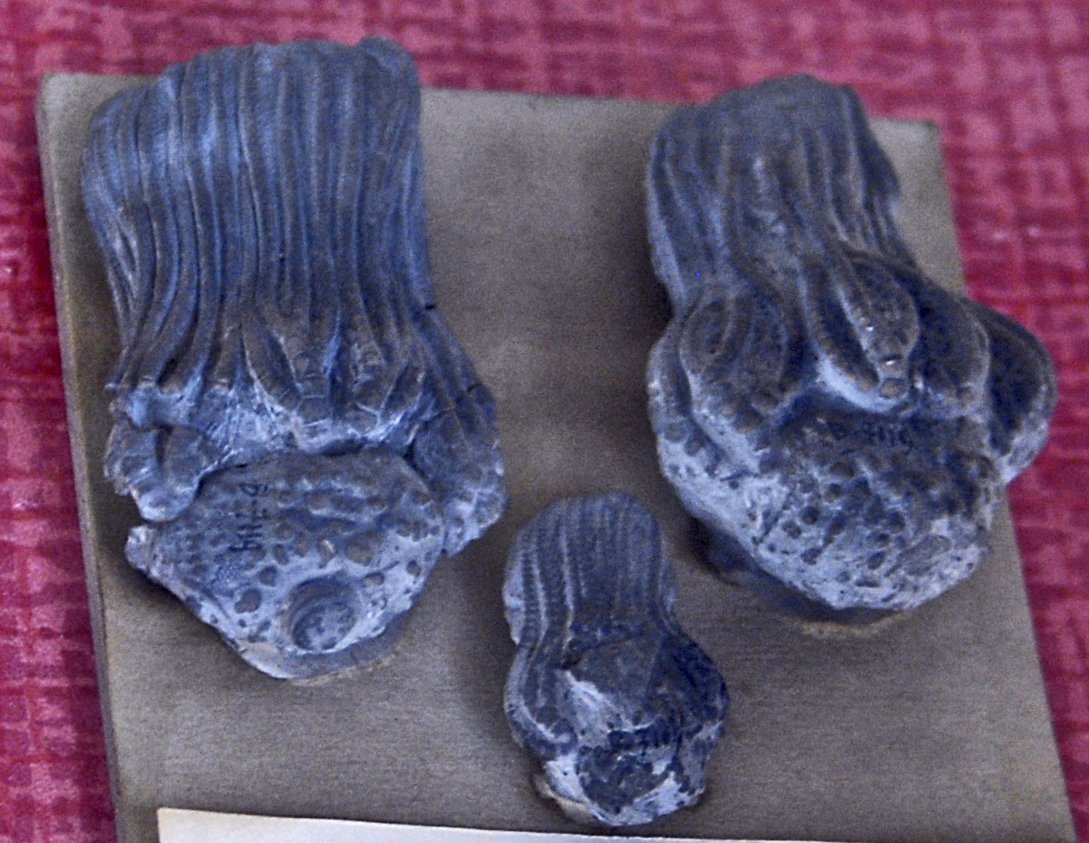
- Three fossilized calyces of the Devonian-Permian crinoid ("sea lily") Platycrinites
  †Platycrinites
  - †Platycrinites bonoensis
  - †Platycrinites georgii
  - †Platycrinites glyptus
  - †Platycrinites hemisphaericus
  - †Platycrinites hemisphericus – tentative report
  - †Platycrinites planus
  - †Platycrinites sculptus
  - †Platycrinites spinifer
- †Platylichas
  - †Platylichas halli
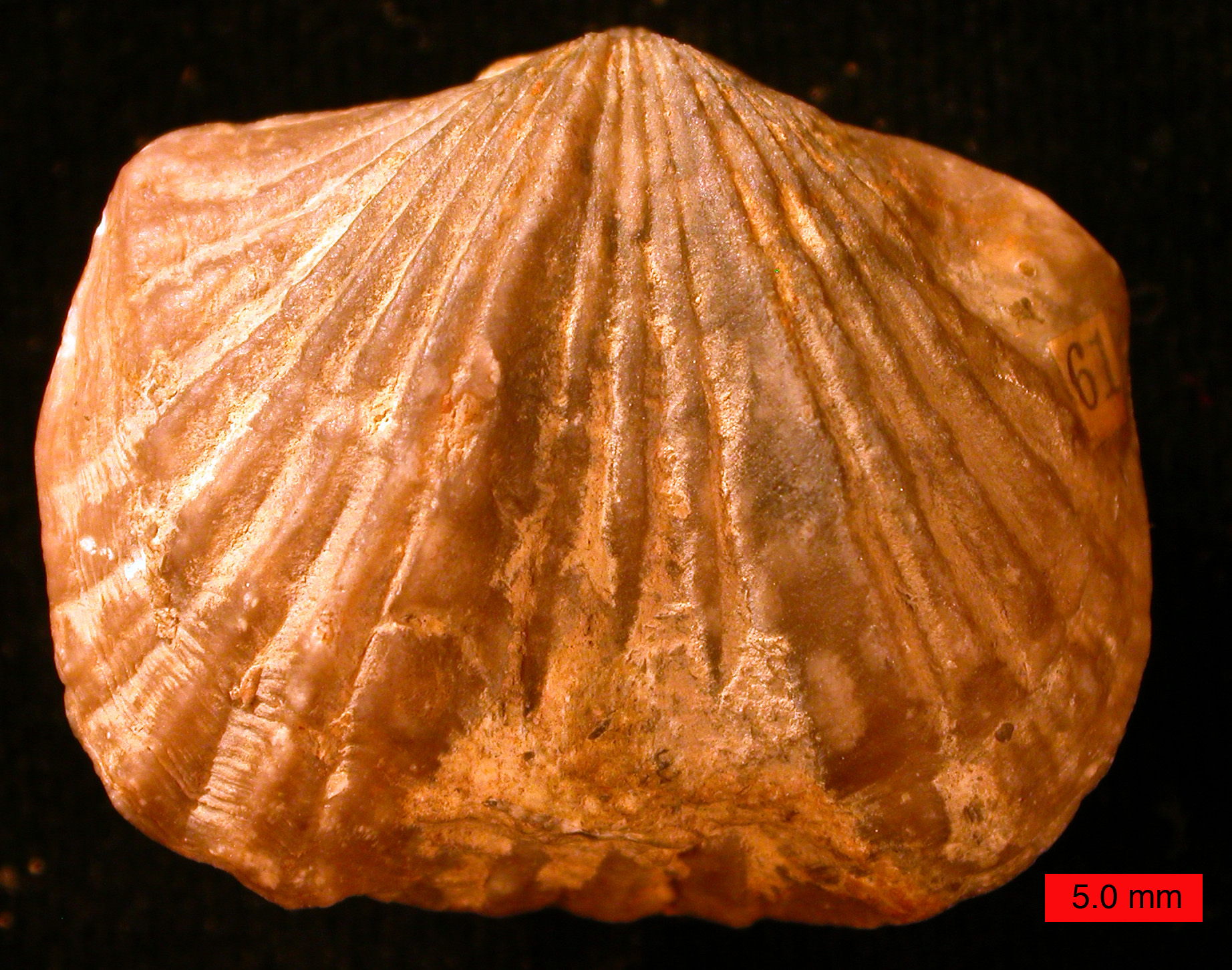
- Fossilized shell of the Middle Ordovician-Silurian brachiopod Platystrophia
  †Platystrophia
  - †Platystrophia acutilirata
  - †Platystrophia amoena
  - †Platystrophia annieana
  - †Platystrophia auburnensis
  - †Platystrophia clarkesvillensis
  - †Platystrophia clarksvillensis
  - †Platystrophia colbiensis
  - †Platystrophia crassa
  - †Platystrophia cypha
  - †Platystrophia elegantula
  - †Platystrophia hopensis
  - †Platystrophia laticosta
  - †Platystrophia ponderosa
  - †Platystrophia sublaticosta
- †Plectambonites
  - †Plectambonites plicatellus
- †Plectocamara
- †Plectoceras
  - †Plectoceras carletonense – or unidentified comparable form
- †Plectorthis
  - †Plectorthis aequivalvis
  - †Plectorthis fissicosta
  - †Plectorthis plicatella
- †Plectospira
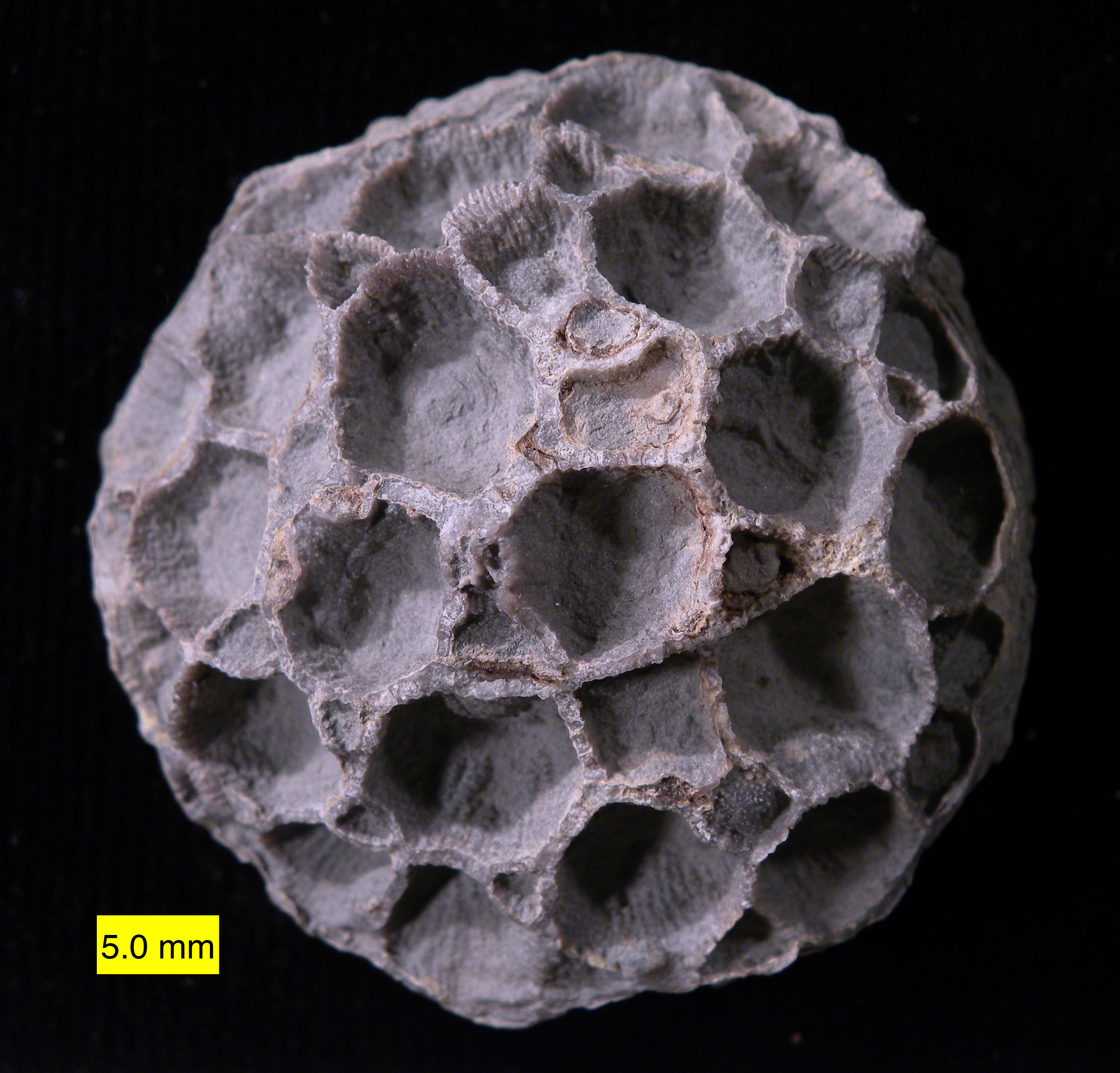
- Fossil of the Silurian-Carboniferous tabulate coral Pleurodictyum
  †Pleurodictyum
  - †Pleurodictyum cylindricum
  - †Pleurodictyum insigne
  - †Pleurodictyum louisvillensis
  - †Pleurodictyum maximum
  - †Pleurodictyum planum
  - †Pleurodictyum wardi
- Pleurotomaria
- †Plicodendrocrinus
  - †Plicodendrocrinus casei
- †Plicorachis
  - †Plicorachis danvillensis
- †Pojetaconcha
  - †Pojetaconcha cressmani
- †Pojetoceras – type locality for genus
  - †Pojetoceras floweri – type locality for species
- †Polaricyclus
  - †Polaricyclus ballardensis
  - †Polaricyclus bordenensis – type locality for species
  - †Polaricyclus conkini – type locality for species
- †Polygnathus
  - †Polygnathus communis
- †Polygrammoceras
- †Polypora
  - †Polypora simulatrix
- †Portlockiella – type locality for genus
  - †Portlockiella kentuckyensis – type locality for species
- †Poteriocrinites
  - †Poteriocrinites horowitzi
- †Prasopora
  - †Prasopora falesi
  - †Prasopora hospitalis
  - †Prasopora simulatrix
- †Primaspis
- †Prismopora
  - †Prismopora serrulata
- †Productus
  - †Productus cestriensis
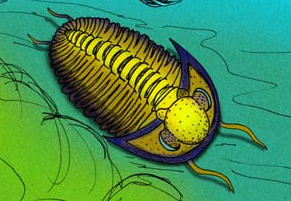
- Restoration of the Silurian trilobite Proetus
  †Proetus
- †Prolecanites
  - †Prolecanites lyoni
- †Propora
  - †Propora eminula
  - †Propora glabra
  - †Propora papillata
  - †Propora puella
- †Protaraea
  - †Protaraea richmondensis
- †Proteoceras
  - †Proteoceras tyronensis – type locality for species
- †Protocyathactis
  - †Protocyathactis cybaeus – or unidentified comparable form
- †Protosalvinia
  - †Protosalvinia arnoldii
  - †Protosalvinia furcata
  - †Protosalvinia rarenna
  - †Protosalvinia ravenna
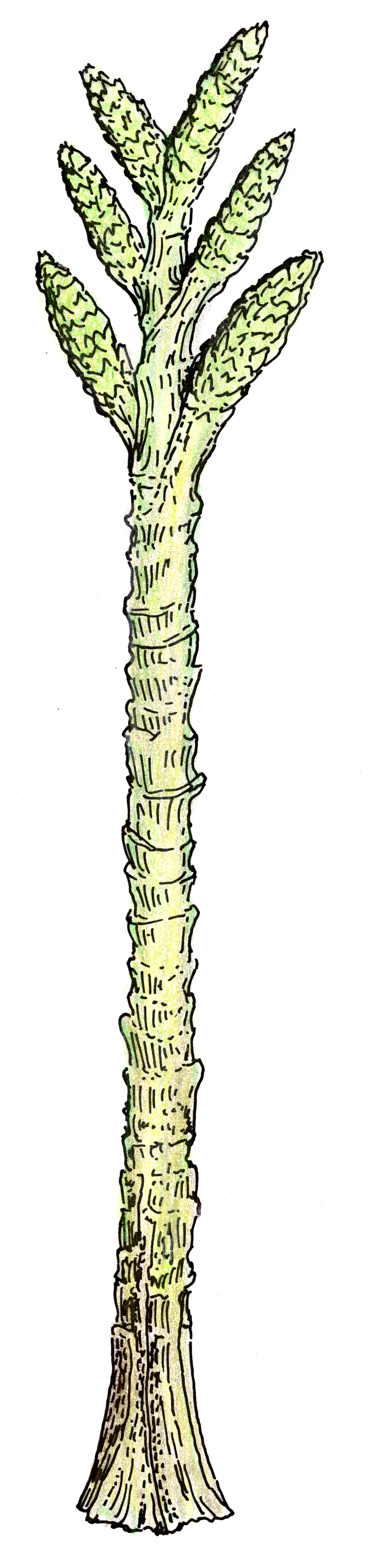
- Restoration based on the "Schunnemunk tree" fossil of the Silurian-Late Devonian tree-like probable fungus Prototaxites
  †Prototaxites
  - †Prototaxites ortoni
- †Protozyga – tentative report
- †Pseudobigalea
  - †Pseudobigalea crista
- †Pseudoconocardium
- †Pseudolingula
- †Pseudomulceodens
  - †Pseudomulceodens cancellatus
- †Pseudopolygnathus
  - †Pseudopolygnathus multistriatus
- †Pseudorthoceras
  - †Pseudorthoceras knoxense
- †Pseudozygopleura
  - †Pseudozygopleura deloi – or unidentified comparable form
  - †Pseudozygopleura lanceolatus
  - †Pseudozygopleura macra – or unidentified comparable form
  - †Pseudozygopleura scitula
  - †Pseudozygopleura semicostata
- †Pterinea
  - †Pterinea demissa
- †Pterotheca
  - †Pterotheca angusta
  - †Pterotheca expansa
- †Pterotocrinus
  - †Pterotocrinus acutus
  - †Pterotocrinus armatus
  - †Pterotocrinus bifurcatus
  - †Pterotocrinus capitalis
  - †Pterotocrinus depressus
  - †Pterotocrinus lingulaformis
  - †Pterotocrinus spatulatus
- †Ptychocrinus
- †Punctatisporites
  - †Punctatisporites irrasus
  - †Punctatisporites minutus
- †Punctospirifer
  - †Punctospirifer transversus
- †Pustulatisporites
  - †Pustulatisporites crenatus
- †Pycnactis
  - †Pycnactis tenuiseptatus

== Q ==
- †Quadratia
- †Quepora
  - †Quepora huronensis
  - †Quepora louisvillensis – type locality for species

== R ==
- †Rafinesquina
  - †Rafinesquina alternata
  - †Rafinesquina ponderosa
  - †Rafinesquina trentonensis
  - †Rafinesquina winchesterensis
- †Raistrickia
  - †Raistrickia breveminens
  - †Raistrickia crocea
- †Raphistoma
- †Raphistomina
  - †Raphistomina lapicida
- †Rectifenestella
  - †Rectifenestella tenax
- †Reinschospora
  - †Reinschospora triangularis
- †Renisporites
  - †Renisporites confossus
- †Resserella
- †Reticulariina
  - †Reticulariina salemensis
  - †Reticulariina spinosa
- †Reticulatisporites
  - †Reticulatisporites muricatus
- †Retispira
  - †Retispira ornatus
- †Rhabdocyclus
  - †Rhabdocyclus scutellus
- †Rhegmaphyllum
  - †Rhegmaphyllum daytonensis
- †Rhineoderma
  - †Rhineoderma wortheni
- †Rhinidictya
- †Rhipidomella
  - †Rhipidomella dubia
- †Rhizophyllum
  - †Rhizophyllum attenuatum
  - †Rhizophyllum corniculum
- †Rhodocrinites
  - †Rhodocrinites barrisi
- †Rhombopora
  - †Rhombopora incrassata
- †Rhombotrypa
  - †Rhombotrypa quadrata
- †Rhynchopora
  - †Rhynchopora beecheri
- †Rhynchotrema
  - †Rhynchotrema dentatum
  - †Rhynchotrema increbescens
  - †Rhynchotrema kentuckiensis
- †Rhytiodentalium
  - †Rhytiodentalium kentuckyensis
- †Rhytiophora
- †Romingerella
  - †Romingerella major
- †Romingeria
  - †Romingeria cummunata
  - †Romingeria umbellifera
  - †Romingeria vannula
- Rostricellula
  - †Rostricellula minuta
- †Ruedemannia
  - †Ruedemannia lirata
- †Rugomena
  - †Rugomena vetusta
- †Rugosochonetes

== S ==
- †Saffordophyllum
  - †Saffordophyllum floweri
- †Salpingostoma
  - †Salpingostoma kentuckyense
- †Salterospira
  - †Salterospira chesterensis
- †Sarocrinus
  - †Sarocrinus varsoviensis
- †Savagellites – tentative report
  - †Savagellites lindahli
- †Savitrisporites
  - †Savitrisporites nux
- †Scalites
  - †Scalites peracutum
- †Scenophyllum
  - †Scenophyllum coniferum – tentative report
- †Schizocrania
- †Schizodus
- †Schizophaulactis
  - †Schizophaulactis densiseptatus
- †Schlotheimophyllum
  - †Schlotheimophyllum fulcratum
  - †Schlotheimophyllum ipomaea
- †Schuchertella
  - †Schuchertella costatula
  - †Schuchertella minuta
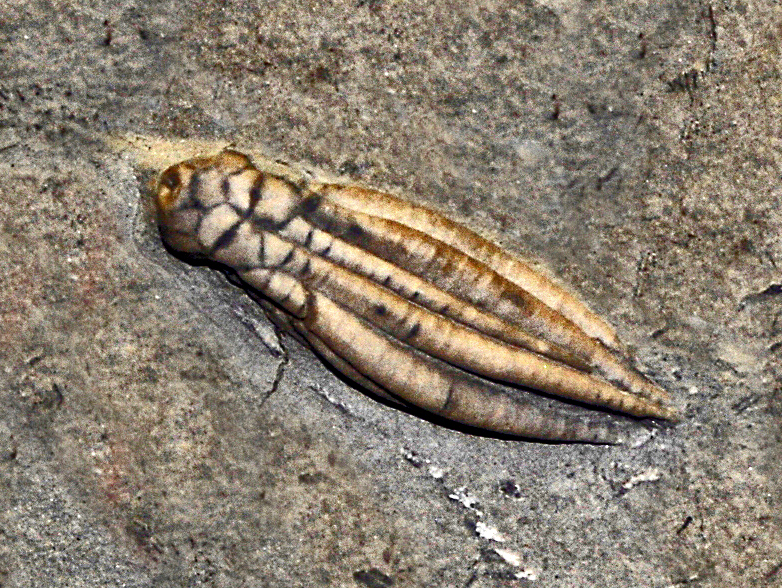
- Fossilized calyx of the Carboniferous crinoid ("sea lily") Scytalocrinus
  †Scytalocrinus
  - †Scytalocrinus decadactylus
  - †Scytalocrinus robustus
- †Seminula
  - †Seminula subtilita
- †Septimyalina
- †Setigerites
  - †Setigerites setiger
- †Sevillea
  - †Sevillea trinucleata – or unidentified related form
- †Siderella
  - †Siderella scotti
- †Similodonta
  - †Similodonta hermitagensis – or unidentified related form
- †Sinuites
  - †Sinuites cancellatus
  - †Sinuites globularis
  - †Sinuites granistriatus
  - †Sinuites obesa
  - †Sinuites pervoluta
  - †Sinuites planodorsatus – type locality for species
- †Sinuitina
- †Sinuspores
  - †Sinuspores sinuatus
- †Siphonophrentis
  - †Siphonophrentis halli
- †Soleniscus
  - †Soleniscus gracilis
  - †Soleniscus texanus
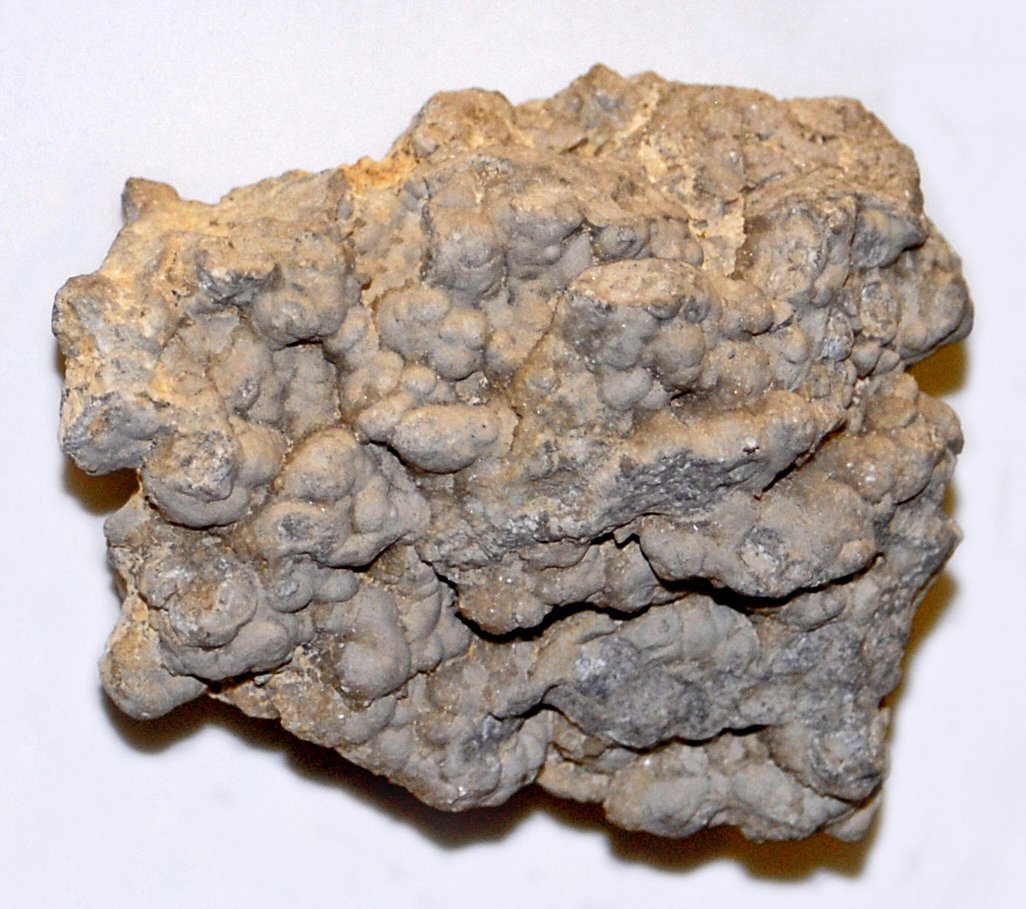
- Fossils of the red alga Solenopora
  †Solenopora
- †Sowerbyella
  - †Sowerbyella curdsvillensis
  - †Sowerbyella grierensis – type locality for species
  - †Sowerbyella rugosa
- †Sowerbyites
- †Spackmanites
  - †Spackmanites habibii
- †Sphenophyllum
  - †Sphenophyllum cuneifolium
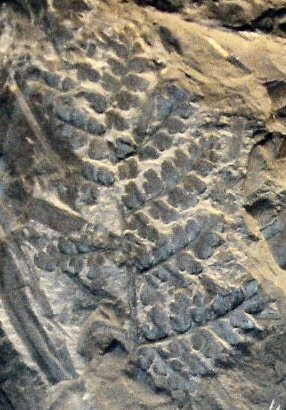
- Fossilized foliage of the Late-Devonian-Cretaceous seed fern Sphenopteris
  †Sphenopteris
  - †Sphenopteris amoena
  - †Sphenopteris obtusiloba
- †Sphenosphaera
  - †Sphenosphaera bilineatus – type locality for species
  - †Sphenosphaera burginensis
  - †Sphenosphaera capax
  - †Sphenosphaera mohri
  - †Sphenosphaera recurvus
  - †Sphenosphaera rogersensis
  - †Sphenosphaera troosti
- †Sphenothallus
- †Spicuchelodes
  - †Spicuchelodes cressmani
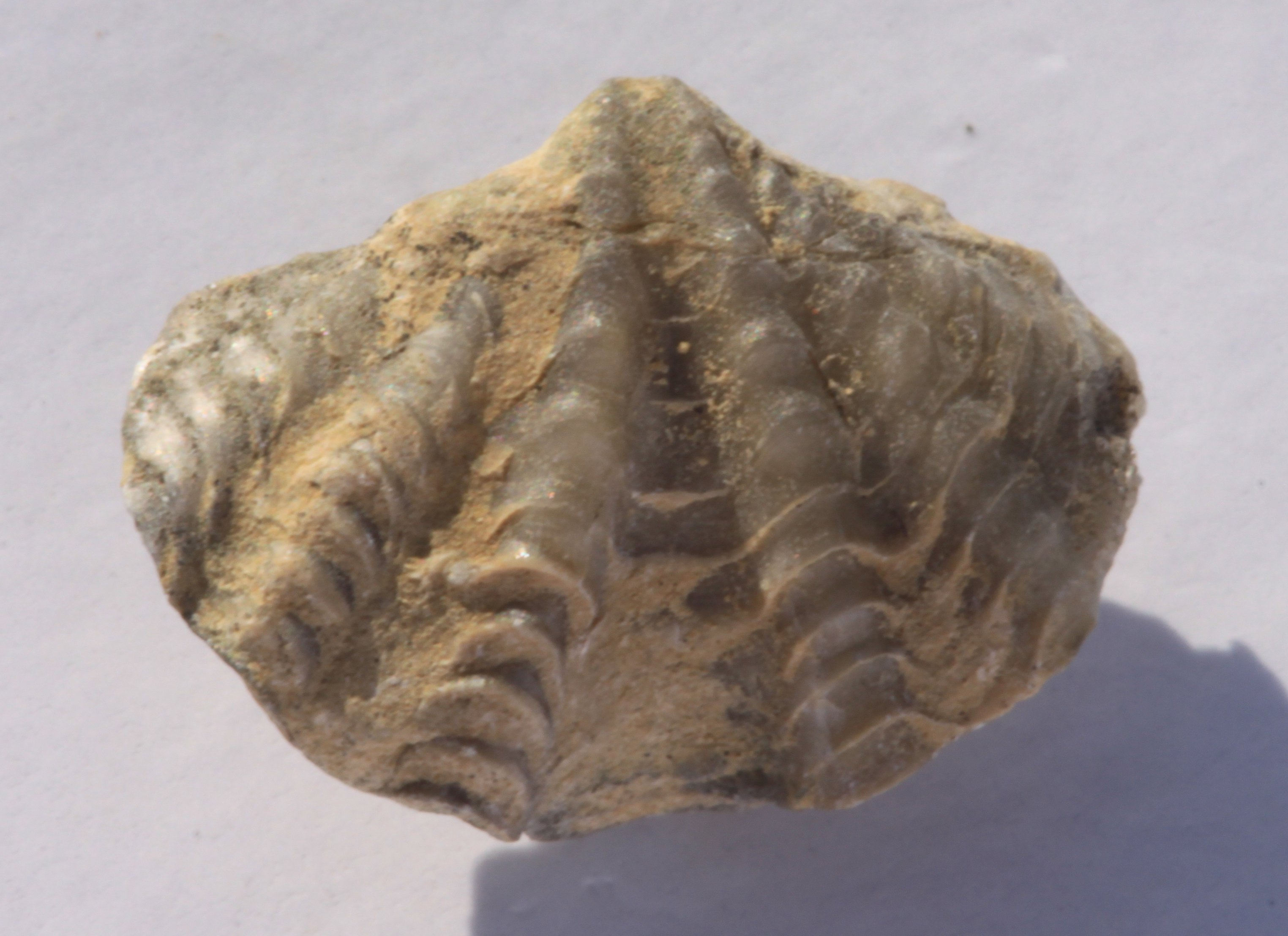
- Fossilized shell of the Late Ordovician-Late Triassic brachiopod Spirifer
  †Spirifer
  - †Spirifer bifurcatus
  - †Spirifer increbescens
  - †Spirifer keokuk
  - †Spirifer lateralis
  - †Spirifer rockymontanus
  - †Spirifer subaequalis
  - †Spirifer tenuicostatus
  - †Spirifer washingtonensis
- †Spiriferellina – tentative report
- †Spiriferina
  - †Spiriferina subelliptica
- †Sporangites
  - †Sporangites huronensis
- †Springericrinus
  - †Springericrinus magniventrus
- †Stauropteris
  - †Stauropteris biseriata
- †Stegacanthia
- †Stegocoelia
  - †Stegocoelia kentuckiensis
- †Steloxylon
  - †Steloxylon irvingense
  - †Steloxylon santaecrucis
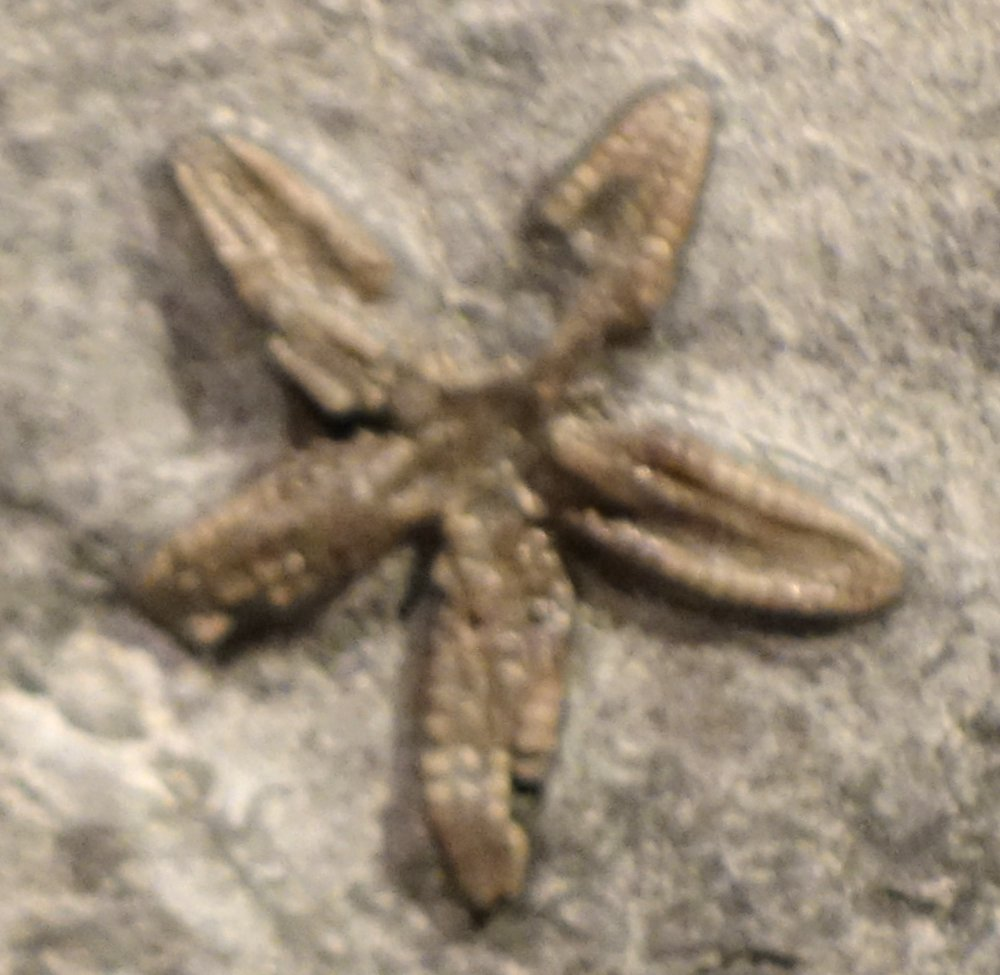
- Fossils of the Ordovician-Silurian brittle star Stenaster
  †Stenaster
  - †Stenaster obtusus – or unidentified comparable form
- †Stenomyelon
  - †Stenomyelon muratum
- †Stenopora
- †Stenoscisma
  - †Stenoscisma explanatum
- †Stephanozyga
  - †Stephanozyga nodosa
- †Stereolasma
  - †Stereolasma gallicalcar
  - †Stereolasma rectum
- †Stereopteris
  - †Stereopteris annularis
- †Stictopora
  - †Stictopora neglecta
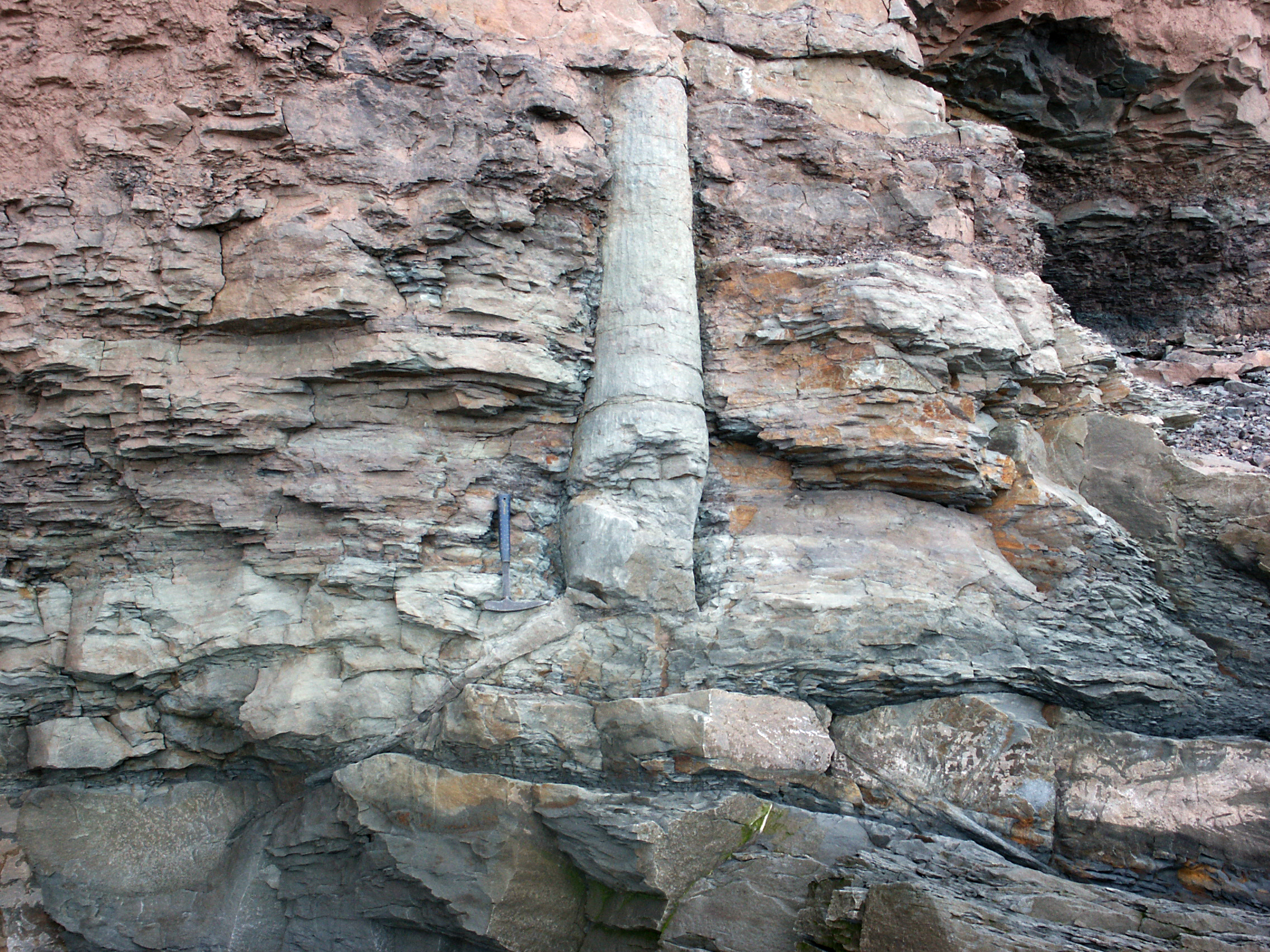
- Fossil preserved in situ of a Carboniferous tree-like club moss relative with attached Stigmaria rhizome system
  †Stigmaria
  - †Stigmaria ficoides
  - †Stigmaria wedingtonensis
- †Stigmatella
  - †Stigmatella conica – or unidentified comparable form
  - †Stigmatella multispinosa
- †Stinocrinus
  - †Stinocrinus granulosus
- Stomatopora
  - †Stomatopora arachnoidea
- †Straparollus
  - †Straparollus spergenensis
- †Streblochondria
- †Streblopteria
- †Streptelasma
  - †Streptelasma angulatum
  - †Streptelasma divaricans
  - †Streptelasma obliquum
  - †Streptelasma scoleciforme
  - †Streptelasma subvesiculare – tentative report
- †Striatopora
  - †Striatopora huronensis
- †Strobeus
  - †Strobeus paludinaeformis – or unidentified comparable form
- †Stromatocerium
  - †Stromatocerium huronense
- †Strombodes
  - †Strombodes shumardi
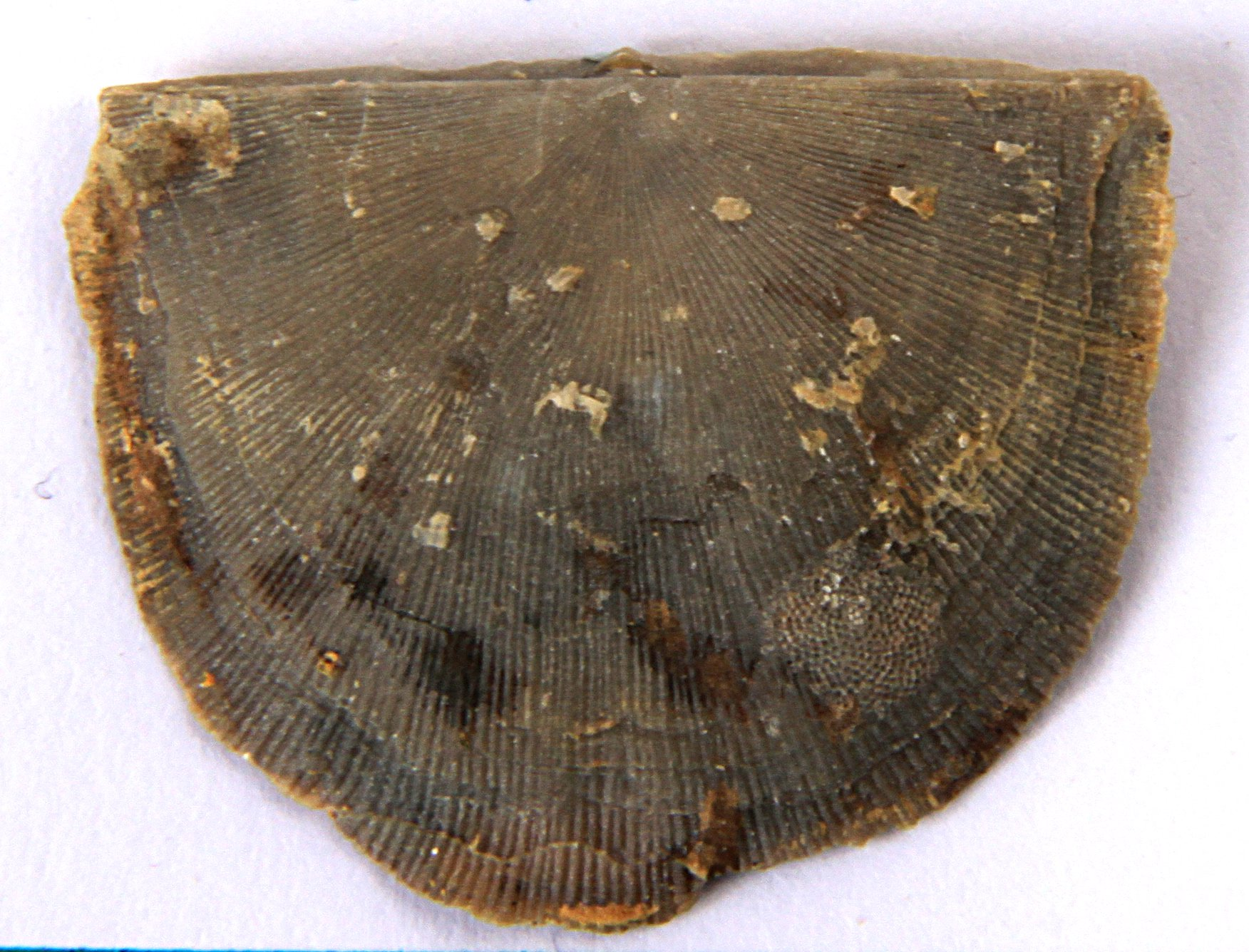
- Fossilized shell of the Ordovician-Silurian brachiopod Strophomena
  †Strophomena
  - †Strophomena concordensis
  - †Strophomena costellata – or unidentified comparable form
  - †Strophomena maysvillensis
  - †Strophomena musculosa – or unidentified comparable form
  - †Strophomena neglecta
  - †Strophomena planoconvexa
  - †Strophomena planumbona
  - †Strophomena sinuata
  - †Strophomena sulcata
- †Strophostylus
  - †Strophostylus chesterensis
  - †Strophostylus wortheni
- †Subulites
  - †Subulites parvus – type locality for species
- †Sulcoretepora
  - †Sulcoretepora lineata
- †Synbathocrinus
  - †Synbathocrinus angularis
  - †Synbathocrinus dentatus
  - †Synbathocrinus robustus
  - †Synbathocrinus swallovi
- †Syringolites
  - †Syringolites vesiculosus
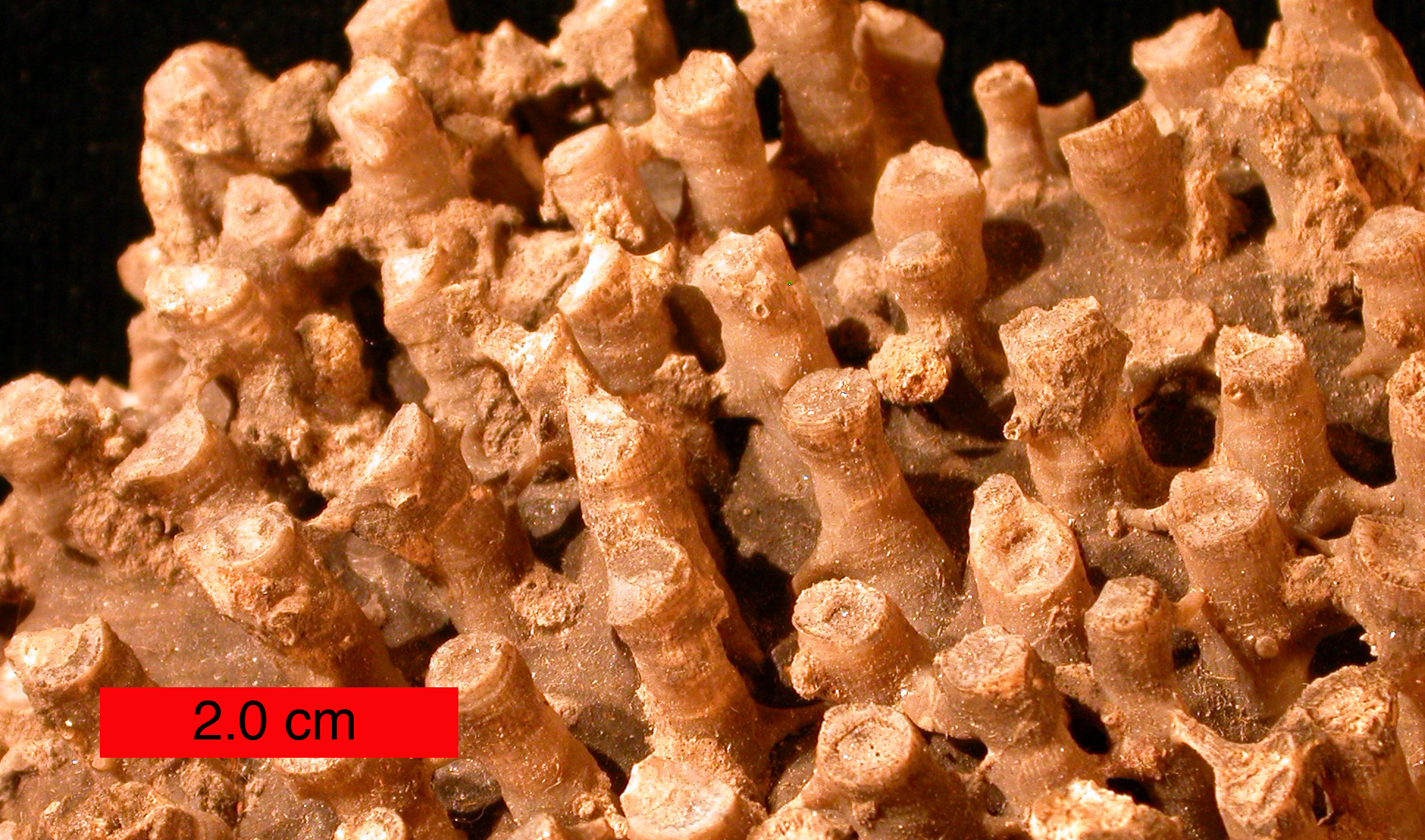
- Fossil of the Devonian tabulate coral Syringopora
  †Syringopora
  - †Syringopora hisingeri
  - †Syringopora monroensis
  - †Syringopora perelegans

== T ==
- †Tabulipora
  - †Tabulipora cestriensis
  - †Tabulipora penerudis
  - †Tabulipora ramosa
- †Talarocrinus
  - †Talarocrinus simplex
- †Tancrediopsis
  - †Tancrediopsis cuneata
- †Tarphophragma
  - †Tarphophragma multitabulata
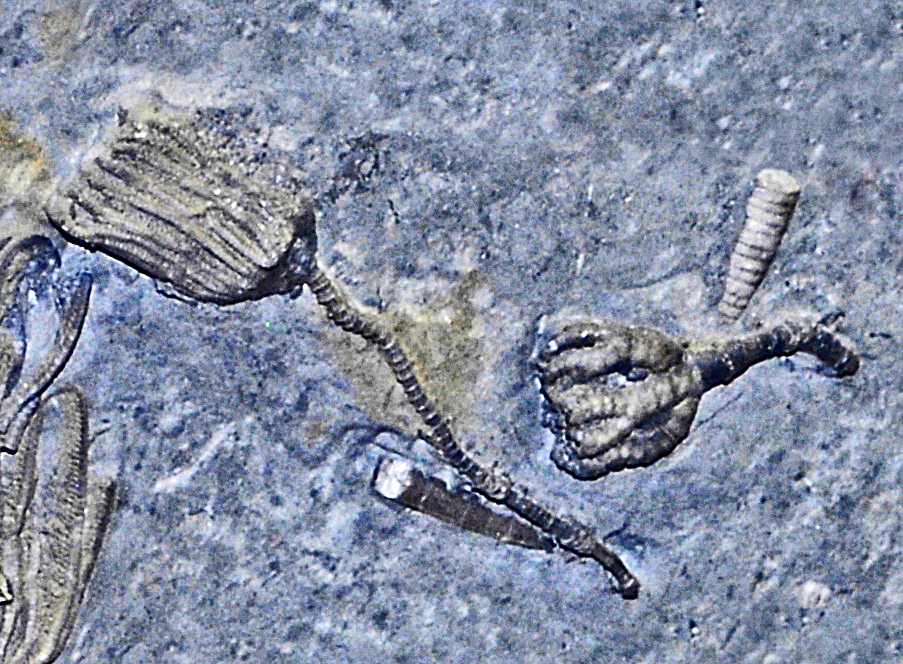
- Fossil of the Silurian-Carboniferous crinoid ("sea lily") Taxocrinus (right)
  †Taxocrinus
  - †Taxocrinus colletti
  - †Taxocrinus pustulosus
- †Technophorus
  - †Technophorus cincinnatiense
  - †Technophorus faberi
  - †Technophorus punctostriatus
- †Teichochilina – tentative report
- †Temnodiscus
  - †Temnodiscus nitidula
- †Tetracamera
  - †Tetracamera arctirostrata
  - †Tetracamera grosvenori
  - †Tetracamera mutata
  - †Tetracamera subcuneata
- †Tetradium
  - †Tetradium approximatum
  - †Tetradium cellulosum – or unidentified comparable form
- †Tetranota
  - †Tetranota obsoleta
- †Thamniscus
- †Thamnopora
  - †Thamnopora limitaris
- †Thamnoptychia
  - †Thamnoptychia alternans
  - †Thamnoptychia vermiculosa
- †Thecia
  - †Thecia minor
- †Theelia
  - †Theelia hexacneme – type locality for species
- †Thinocrinus
  - †Thinocrinus lowei
- †Thuroholia
  - †Thuroholia croneisi
  - †Thuroholia floydensis – type locality for species
  - †Thuroholia irregularis – type locality for species
  - †Thuroholia wanlessi – type locality for species
- †Toichochilina
- †Torynifer
  - †Torynifer pseudolineatus
  - †Torynifer setigera
- †Trematis
- †Trepospira
  - †Trepospira depressa
  - †Trepospira illinoisensis
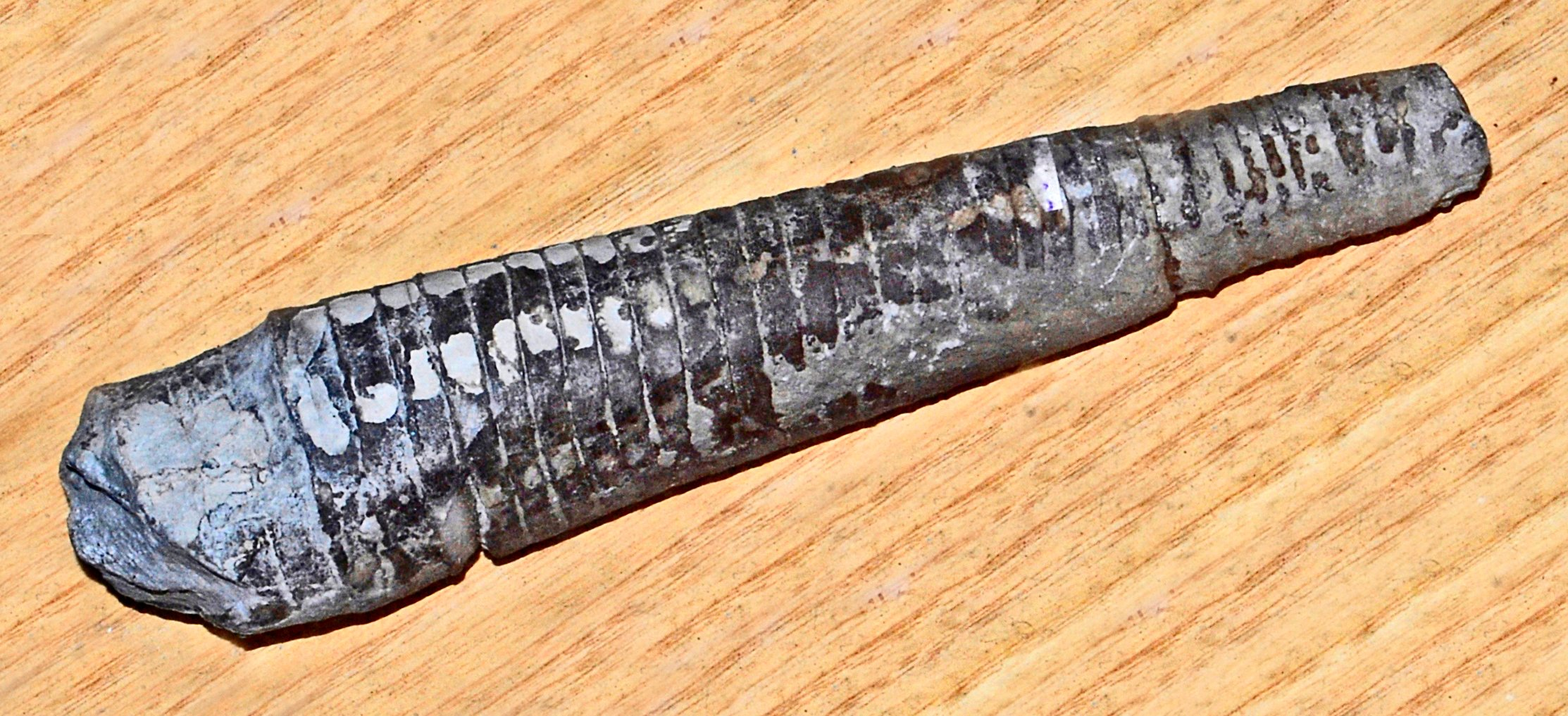
- Fossilized shell of the Ordovician nautiloid cephalopod Treptoceras
  †Treptoceras
  - †Treptoceras cincinnatiensis
  - †Treptoceras duseri
  - †Treptoceras transversum
- †Triarthrus
  - †Triarthrus eatoni
- †Triboloporus
  - †Triboloporus cryptoplicatus
- †Triendoceras – tentative report
  - †Triendoceras davisi – type locality for species
- †Trigonocarpus
- †Trigonodictya
  - †Trigonodictya acuta
- †Trocholites
  - †Trocholites faberi
- †Trochonema
  - †Trochonema canadensis
  - †Trochonema subcrassum
- †Trochonemella
  - †Trochonemella notablis
- †Trochophyllum
- †Tropidodiscus
- †Tryplasma
  - †Tryplasma cylindrica
  - †Tryplasma mitella
  - †Tryplasma prava
  - †Tryplasma radicula

== U ==
- †Ulodendron
  - †Ulodendron majus
- †Ulrichia
  - †Ulrichia nodosa
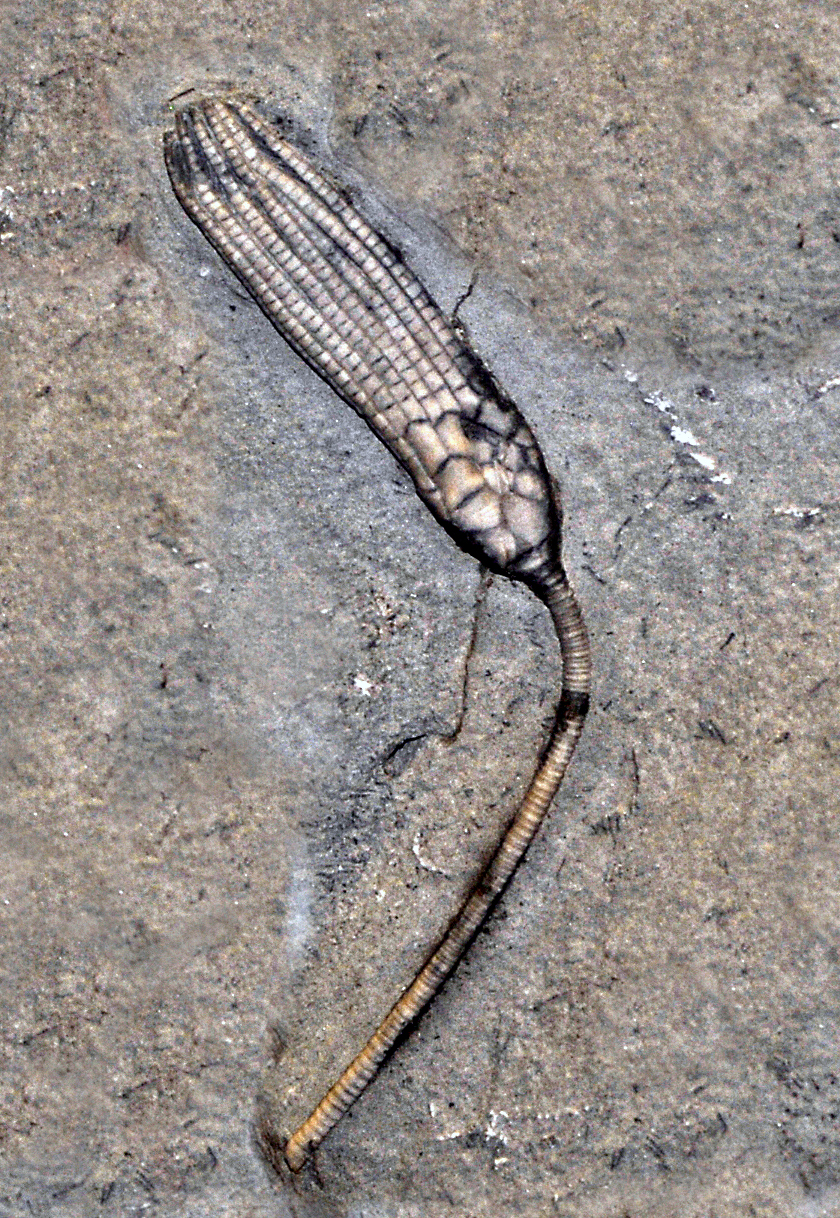
- Fossilized calyx ad partial stem of the Carboniferous crinoid ("sea lily") Ulrichicrinus
  †Ulrichicrinus
  - †Ulrichicrinus agnatus
- †Ulrichocystis
  - †Ulrichocystis eximia
- †Undulabucania
  - †Undulabucania punctifrons
- †Uperocrinus
  - †Uperocrinus acuminatus – type locality for species
  - †Uperocrinus nashvillae
  - †Uperocrinus pyriformis
  - †Uperocrinus robustus

== V ==
- †Vaginoceras
- †Vallatotheca
  - †Vallatotheca unguiformis
- †Vanuxemia
  - †Vanuxemia dixonensis – or unidentified related form
  - †Vanuxemia gibbosa
  - †Vanuxemia nana – or unidentified comparable form
  - †Vanuxemia sardesoni – or unidentified related form
- †Verrucosisporites
  - †Verrucosisporites microtuberosus
- †Vestispora
  - †Vestispora costata
- †Volsellina
  - †Volsellina subelliptica
- †Vorticina
  - †Vorticina anneae – type locality for species

== W ==
- †Waagenella
  - †Waagenella claxtonensis
- †Wachsmuthicrinus
  - †Wachsmuthicrinus spinosulus
  - †Wachsmuthicrinus spinulosus
- †Warthinia
  - †Warthinia nodosa
- †Weissistachys
  - †Weissistachys kentuckiensis
- †Wellergyi – type locality for genus
  - †Wellergyi chesterensis
- †Whiteavesia
- †Wilsonites
  - †Wilsonites circularis
  - †Wilsonites vesicatus
- †Winchelloceras
  - †Winchelloceras allei
  - †Winchelloceras knappi – type locality for species
- †Worthenia
  - †Worthenia tabulata
- †Worthenocrinus
  - †Worthenocrinus hardinensis
- †Worthenopora

== X ==
- †Xenocrinus
- †Xyeleblastus
  - †Xyeleblastus magnificus

== Z ==
- †Zadelsdorfia – tentative report
- †Zaphrenthis
  - †Zaphrenthis amplexiformis – tentative report
- †Zygospira
  - †Zygospira cincinnatiensis
  - †Zygospira kentuckyensis
  - †Zygospira lebanonensis
  - †Zygospira modesta
