= List of the prehistoric life of Indiana =

The fossilized remains of various prehistoric life-forms have been reported from within the U.S. state of Indiana.

== Precambrian ==
The Paleobiology Database records no known occurrences of Precambrian fossils in Indiana.

== Paleozoic ==
=== Selected Paleozoic taxa of Indiana ===
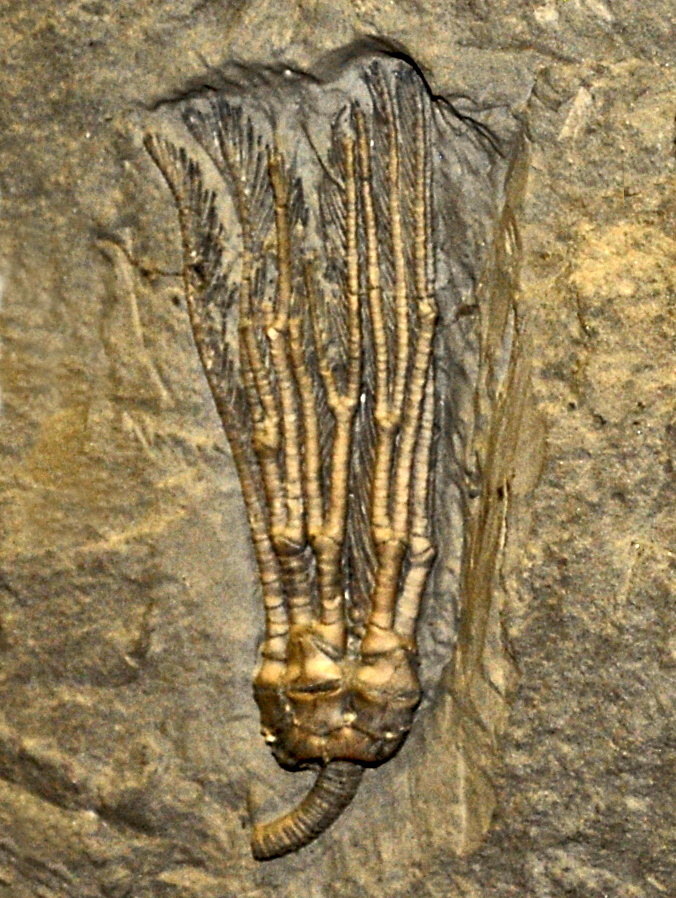
- Fossilized calyx of the Carboniferous crinoid ("sea lily") Abrotocrinus
  †Abrotocrinus
  - †Abrotocrinus coreyi
  - †Abrotocrinus nodosus
  - †Abrotocrinus unicus
- †Achistrum
  - †Achistrum brevis – type locality for species
  - †Achistrum ludwigi
  - †Achistrum nicholsoni
  - †Achistrum triassicum
- †Acidaspis
- † Acrophyllum
- †Actinocrinites
  - †Actinocrinites gibsoni
  - †Actinocrinites grandissimus
  - †Actinocrinites lobatus – tentative report
  - †Actinocrinites lowei
- †Agaricocrinus
  - †Agaricocrinus americanus
- †Aipoceras – tentative report
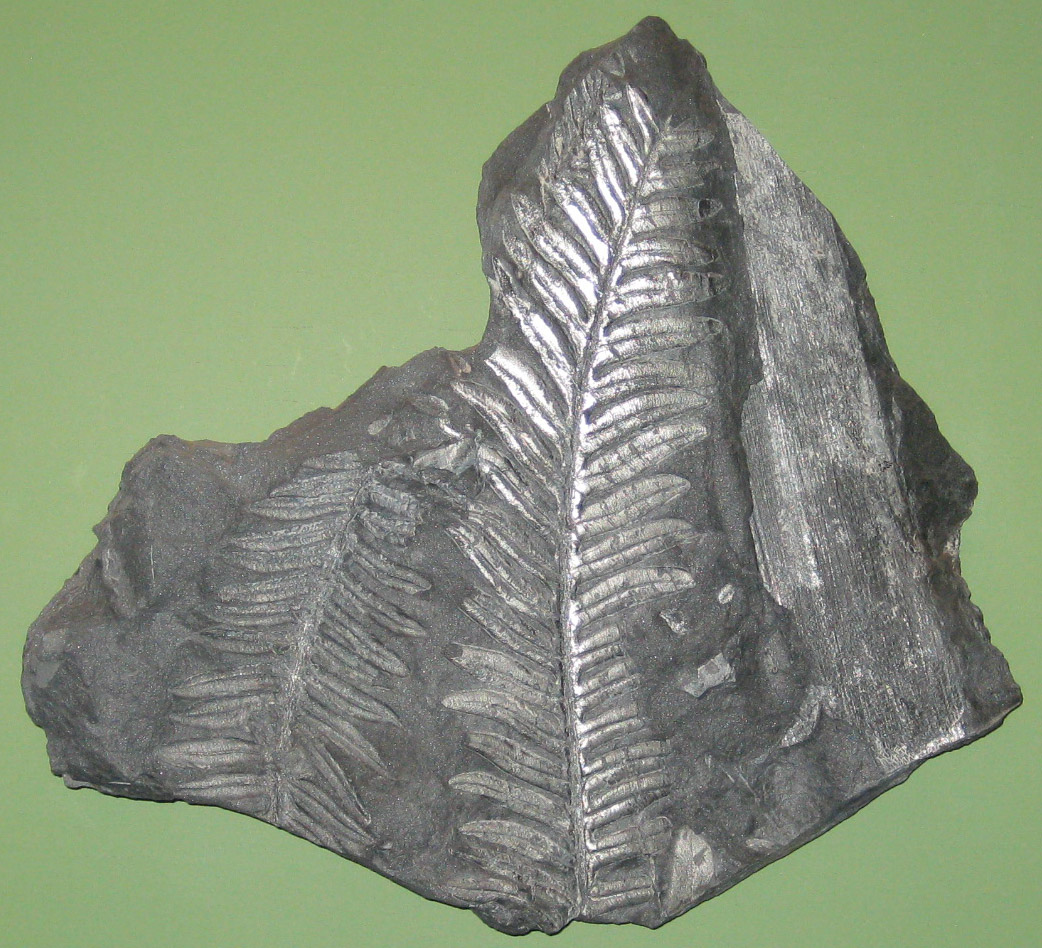
- Fossilized fronds of the Carboniferous-Early Cretaceous seed fern Alethopteris
  †Alethopteris
  - †Alethopteris davreuxi
  - †Alethopteris decurrens
  - †Alethopteris grandini
  - †Alethopteris lonchitica
  - †Alethopteris owenii
  - †Alethopteris serlii
- Ammodiscus
- †Ammonellipsites
- †Amplexopora
- †Amplexus
- †Anchiopsis
- †Angustidontus
- †Annularia
  - †Annularia mucronata
  - †Annularia radiata
  - †Annularia sphenophylloides
  - †Annularia stellata
- †Aphlebia
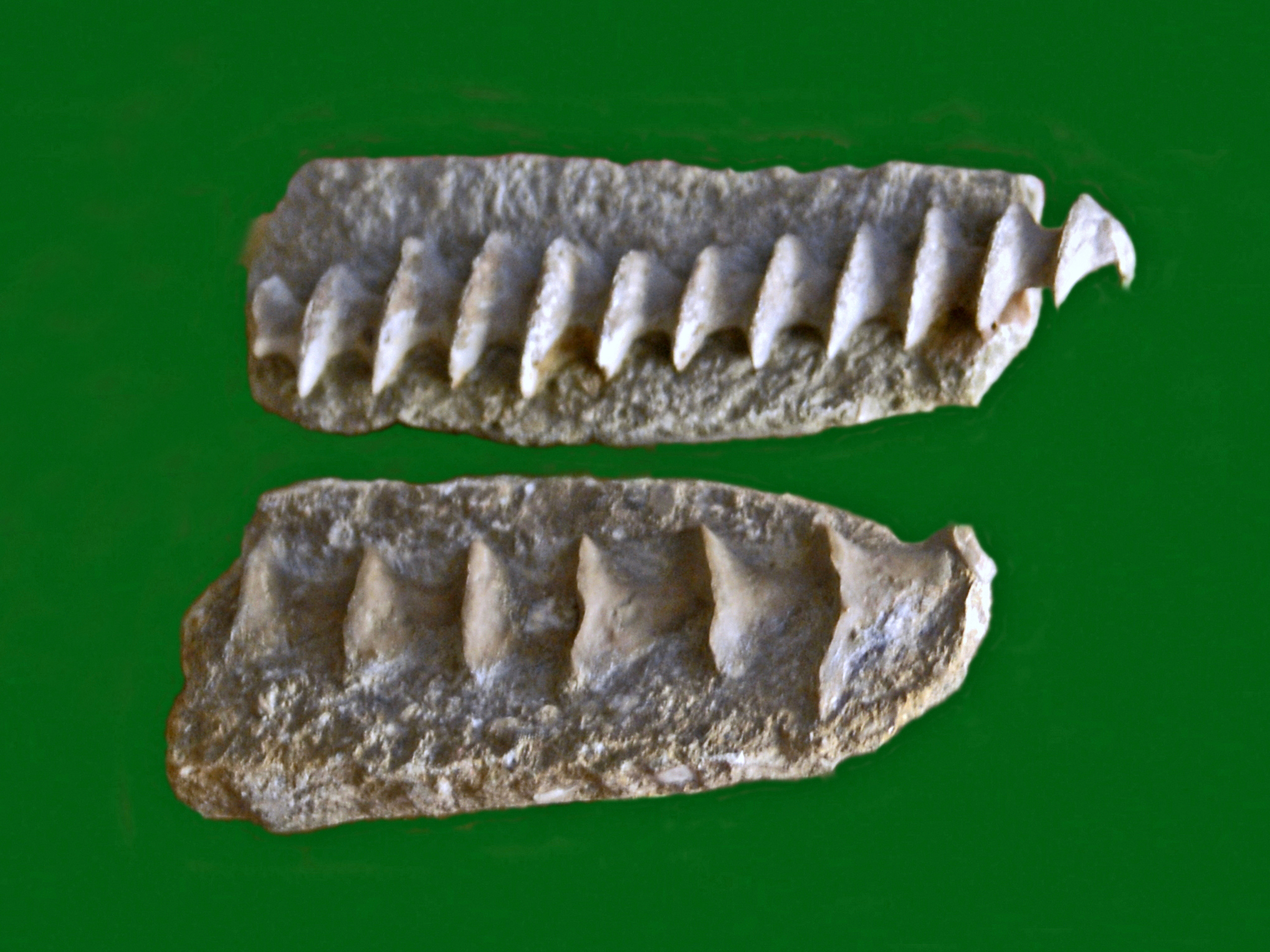
- Fossils of the Carboniferous-Permian bryozoan Archimedes
  †Archimedes
  - †Archimedes communis
  - †Archimedes compactus
  - †Archimedes distans
  - †Archimedes intermedius
  - †Archimedes invaginatus
  - †Archimedes lativolvis
  - †Archimedes macfarlani
  - †Archimedes meekanoides
  - †Archimedes meekanus
  - †Archimedes negligens – or unidentified comparable form
  - †Archimedes proutanus
  - †Archimedes swallovanus
  - †Archimedes swallowvanus
  - †Archimedes symmetricus
  - †Archimedes terebriformis
- †Arctinurus
- †Armenoceras
- †Artisia
- †Asterotheca
  - †Asterotheca crenulata
  - †Asterotheca cyathea
  - †Asterotheca hemitelliodes
  - †Asterotheca miltoni
  - †Asterotheca oreopteridia
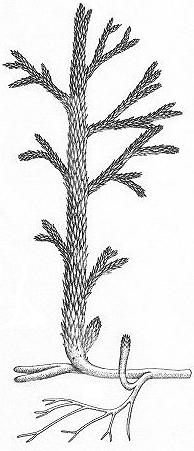
- Life restoration of the Early Devonian club moss relative Asteroxylon
  †Asteroxylon
- †Athyris
  - †Athyris fultonensis
  - †Athyris lamellosa
  - †Athyris parvirostra
  - †Athyris spiriferoides
- †Atrypa
  - †Atrypa newsomensis
  - †Atrypa parva – or unidentified comparable form
  - †Atrypa reticularis
  - †Atrypa reticularus
- †Aulacophyllum
- †Aulopora
  - †Aulopora edithana
  - †Aulopora microbuccinata
  - †Aulopora tubiporoides
- †Aviculopecten
  - †Aviculopecten colletti
  - †Aviculopecten invalidus
  - †Aviculopecten spinuliferus
  - †Aviculopecten terminalis
- † Avonia – tentative report
- † Avonia
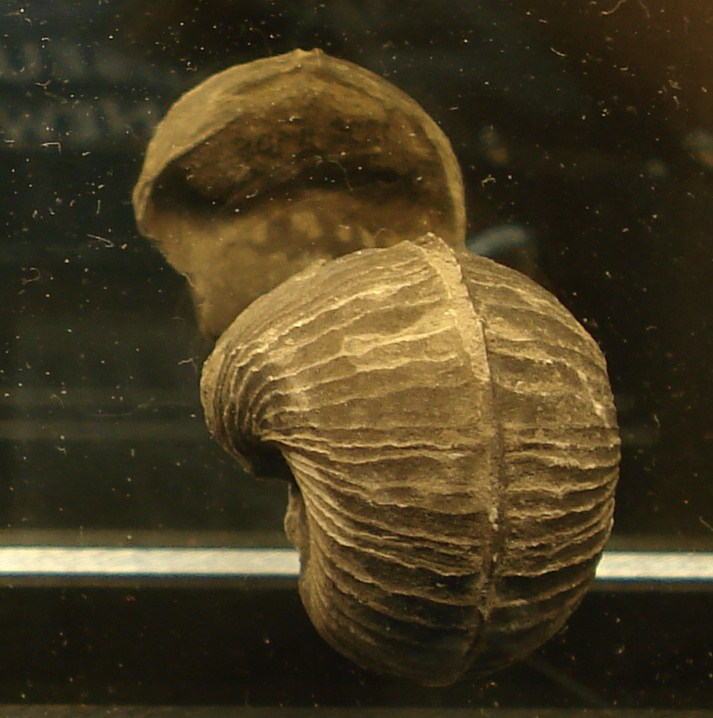
- Fossilized shell of the Silurian-Early Triassic mollusc Bellerophon
  †Bellerophon
  - †Bellerophon gibsoni – type locality for species
  - †Bellerophon jeffersonensis
  - †Bellerophon spergensis – type locality for species
- †Bembexia
- †Beyrichoceras
- †Bordonia
- †Bumastus
  - †Bumastus armatus – or unidentified comparable form
  - †Bumastus insignis
  - †Bumastus ioxus
  - †Bumastus niagarense – or unidentified comparable form
- †Calamites
  - †Calamites cruciatus
  - †Calamites suckowii
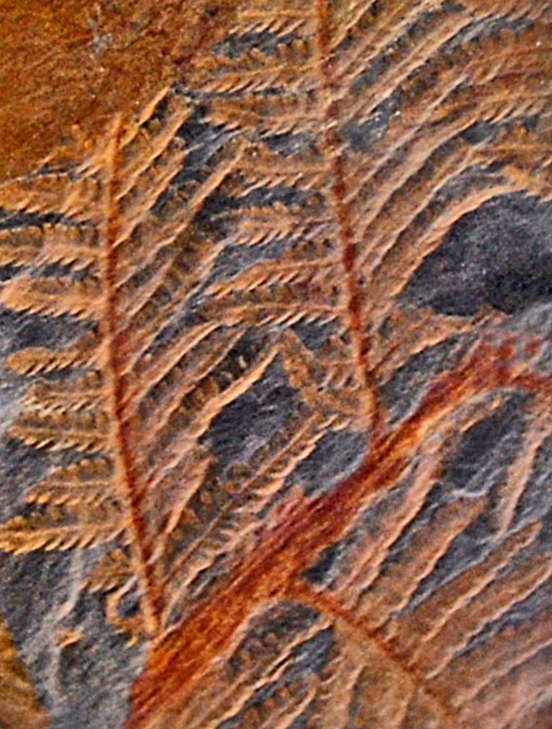
- Fossilized fronds of the Carboniferous seed fern Callipteridium
  †Callipteridium
- †Callixylon
- †Calymene
  - †Calymene breviceps
  - †Calymene celebra
  - †Calymene niagarensis
- †Camarotoechia
  - †Camarotoechia gregaria – tentative report
  - †Camarotoechia horsfordi
  - †Camarotoechia mutata
  - †Camarotoechia neglecta – or unidentified comparable form
  - †Camarotoechia pisa
  - †Camarotoechia tethys
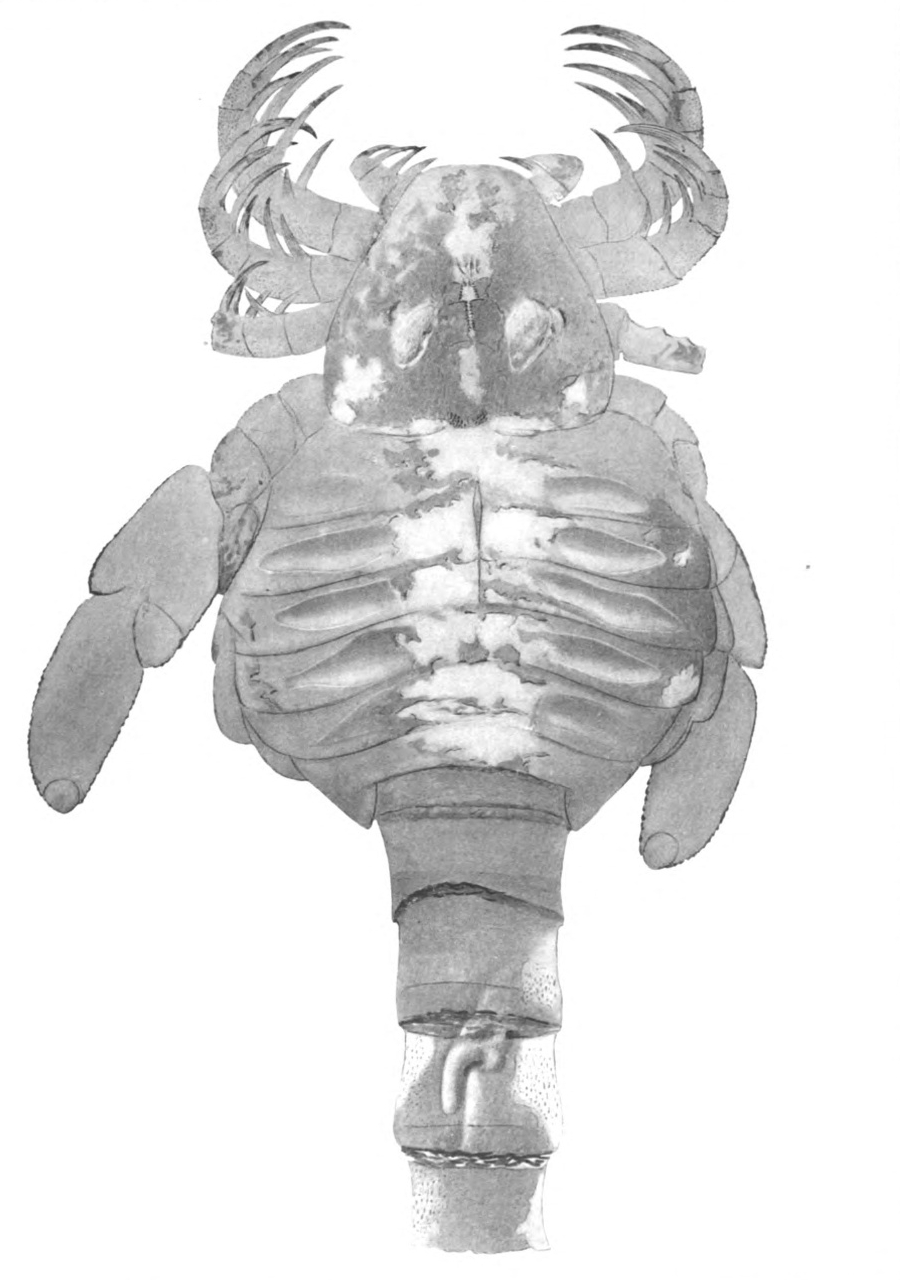
- Fossil of the Silurian eurypterid ("sea scorpion") Carcinosoma
  †Carcinosoma
- †Caseodus
  - †Caseodus eatoni – type locality for species
- †Ceramopora
  - †Ceramopora imbricata
  - †Ceramopora vesicularis
- †Ceraurinus
- †Ceraurus
- †Chancelloria
- †Charactoceras
- †Cheirurus
- †Chomatodus
- †Chondrites
- †Chonetes
  - †Chonetes geniculatus
- †Cincinnetina
  - †Cincinnetina meeki
  - †Cincinnetina multisecta
- †Cladochonus
  - †Cladochonus beecheri
  - †Cladochonus crassus
  - †Cladochonus longi
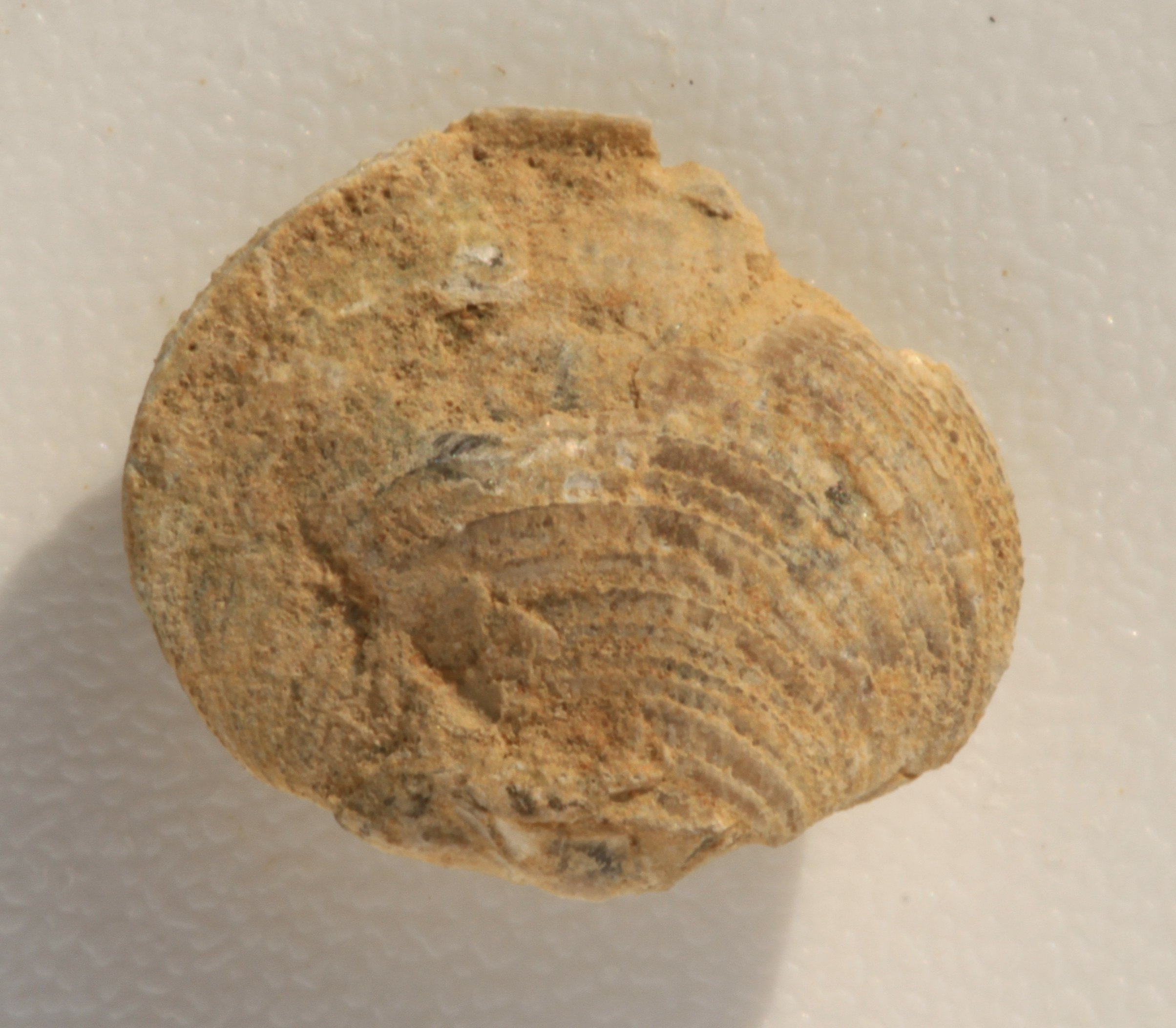
- Fossilized shell of the Middle Devonian-Permian brachiopod Cleiothyridina
  †Cleiothyridina
  - †Cleiothyridina hirsuta
  - †Cleiothyridina sublamellosa
- †Clorinda – tentative report
- †Coenites
  - †Coenites brownsportensis
  - †Coenites cryptodens – or unidentified comparable form
  - †Coenites laqueata – or unidentified comparable form
  - †Coenites rectilineatus
- †Columnaria
  - †Columnaria alveolata
- †Composita
  - †Composita subquadrata
  - †Composita sulcata
  - †Composita trinuclea
- †Conchidium
- †Conocardium
  - †Conocardium richmondense – type locality for species
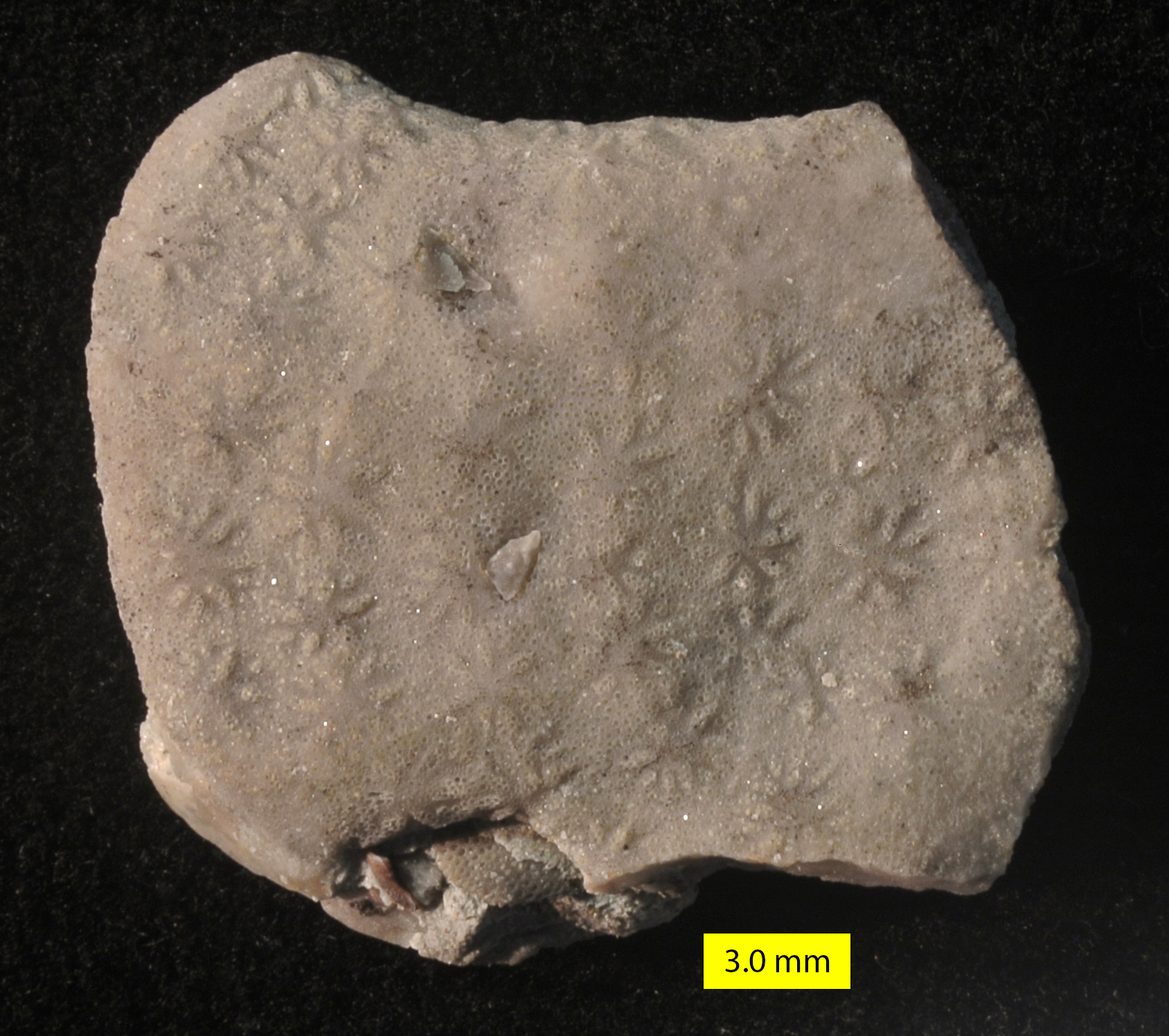
- Fossil of the Ordovician bryozoan Constellaria
  †Constellaria
- †Coolinia
- †Cordaites
  - †Cordaites borassifolius
  - †Cordaites crassinervis
  - †Cordaites principalis
- †Cornulites
  - †Cornulites formosa
  - †Cornulites proprius
- †Coronura
- †Crania
- †Craniops
- †Crotalocrinites
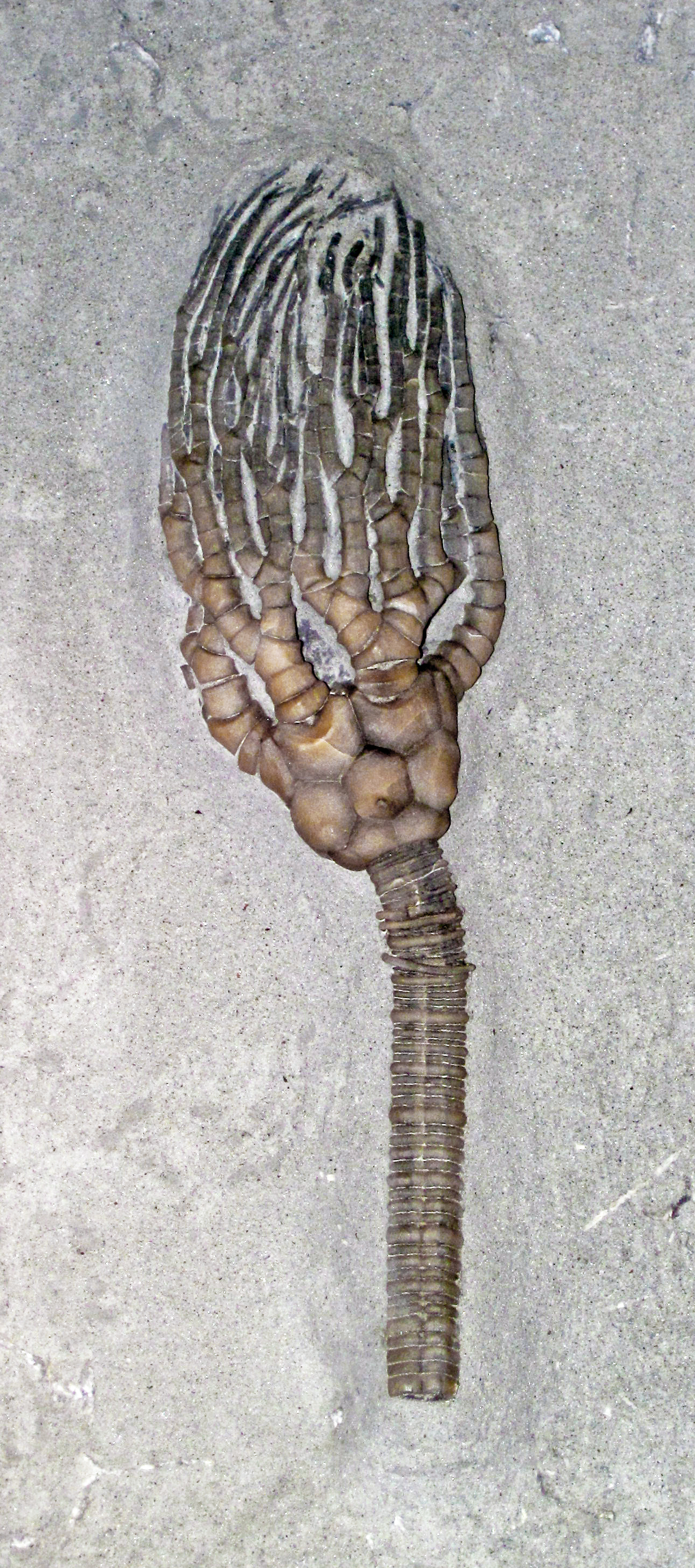
- Fossilized calyx and partial stem of the Silurian-Permian crinoid ("sea lily") Cyathocrinites
  †Cyathocrinites
  - †Cyathocrinites glenni – or unidentified comparable form
  - †Cyathocrinites multibrachiatus
  - †Cyathocrinites parvibrachiatus
  - †Cyathocrinites pauli
  - †Cyathocrinites sanduskyensis
  - †Cyathocrinites striatissimus
  - †Cyathocrinites wilsoni
- †Cyclonema
- †Cyclopteris
- †Cyphaspis
- †Cypricardinia
  - †Cypricardinia indenta
  - †Cypricardinia scitula
- †Cyrtolites
- †Cyrtospirifer
- †Cystodictya
  - †Cystodictya lineata
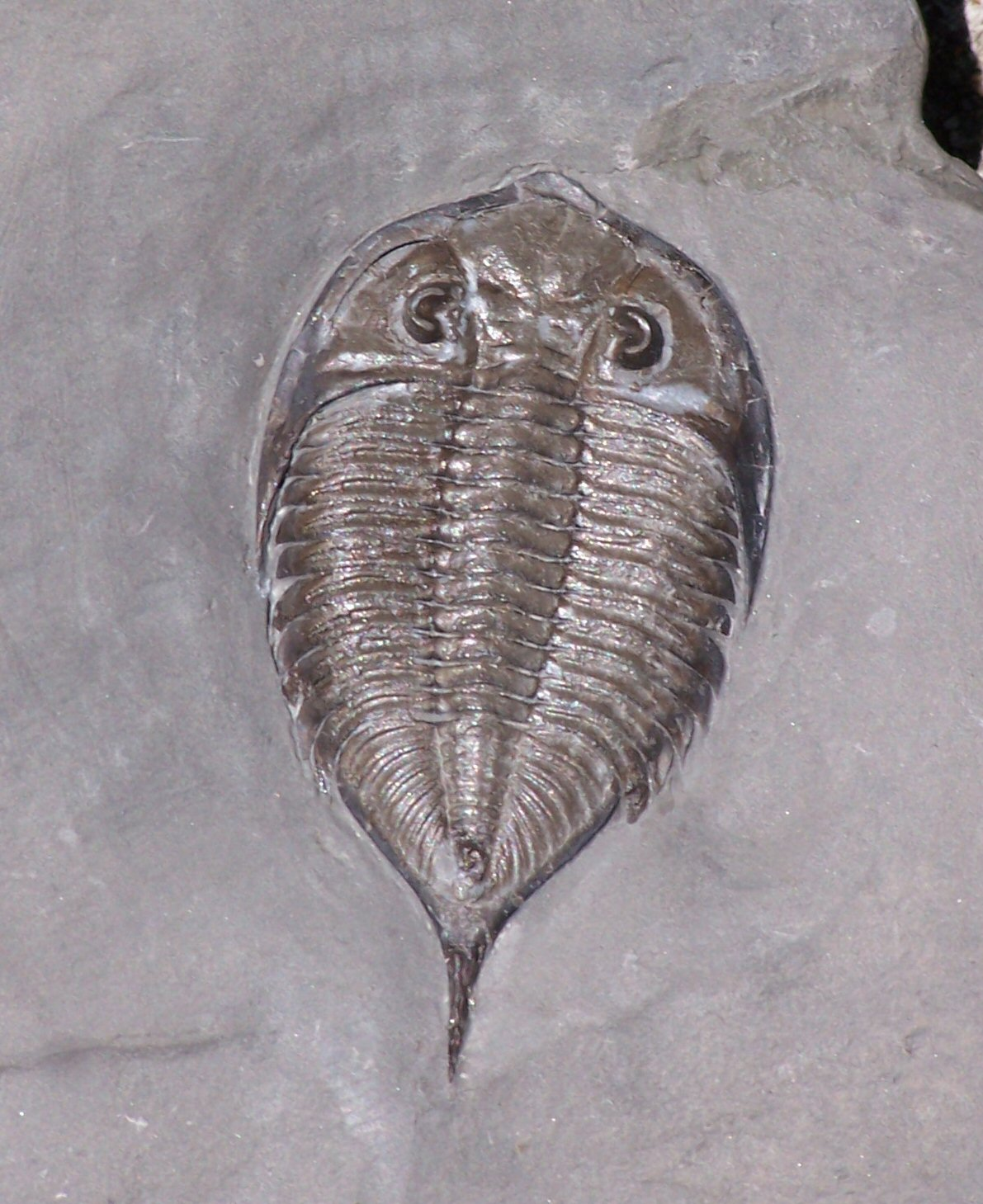
- Fossil of the Late Ordovician-Middle Devonian trilobite Dalmanites
  †Dalmanites
  - †Dalmanites halli
  - †Dalmanites limulurus
- †Danaea
- †Decadocrinus
  - †Decadocrinus depressus
- †Dicoelosia
- †Dictyonema
- †Dimerocrinites
  - †Dimerocrinites carleyi
  - †Dimerocrinites inornatus
  - †Dimerocrinites occidentalis
- †Dinicthys
- †Dizygocrinus
  - †Dizygocrinus indianaensis
  - †Dizygocrinus indianensis
  - †Dizygocrinus venustus – or unidentified comparable form
  - †Dizygocrinus whitei – or unidentified comparable form
- †Drepanopterus
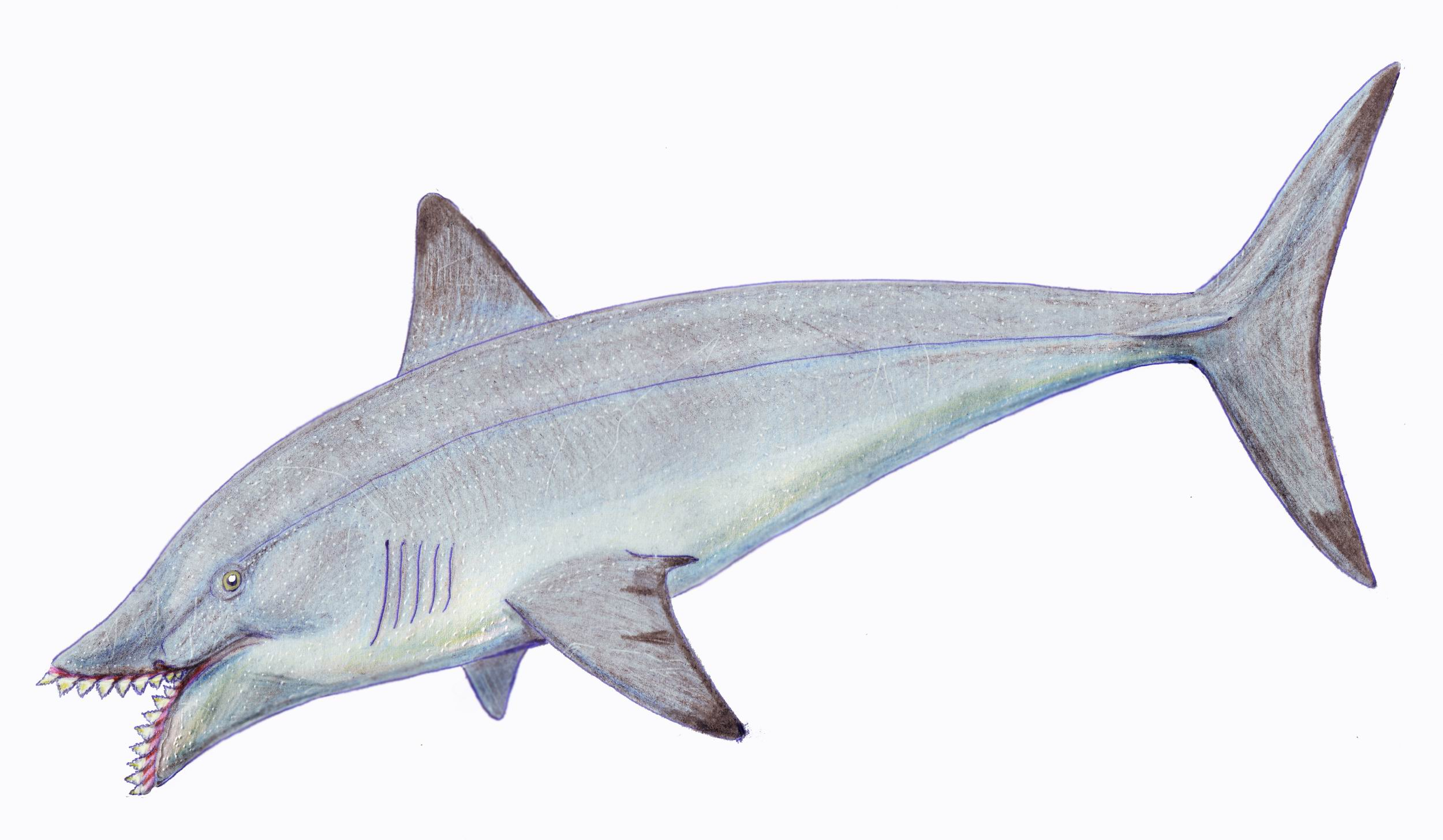
- Life restoration of the Late Devonian-Carboniferous Chimaera relative Edestus
  †Edestus
  - †Edestus heinrichi
- †Edmondia
- †Eldredgeops
  - †Eldredgeops rana
- †Elytron
- †Emmonsia
- †Encrinurus
- Eocaudina
- †Eodictyonella
- †Eospirifer
  - †Eospirifer eudora
  - †Eospirifer foggi
  - †Eospirifer niagarensis
  - †Eospirifer radiatus
- †Eretmocrinus
  - †Eretmocrinus cassedayanus – tentative report
  - †Eretmocrinus magnificus
- †Erieopterus
- †Eucalyptocrinites
  - †Eucalyptocrinites caelatus
  - †Eucalyptocrinites crassus
  - †Eucalyptocrinites tuberculatus
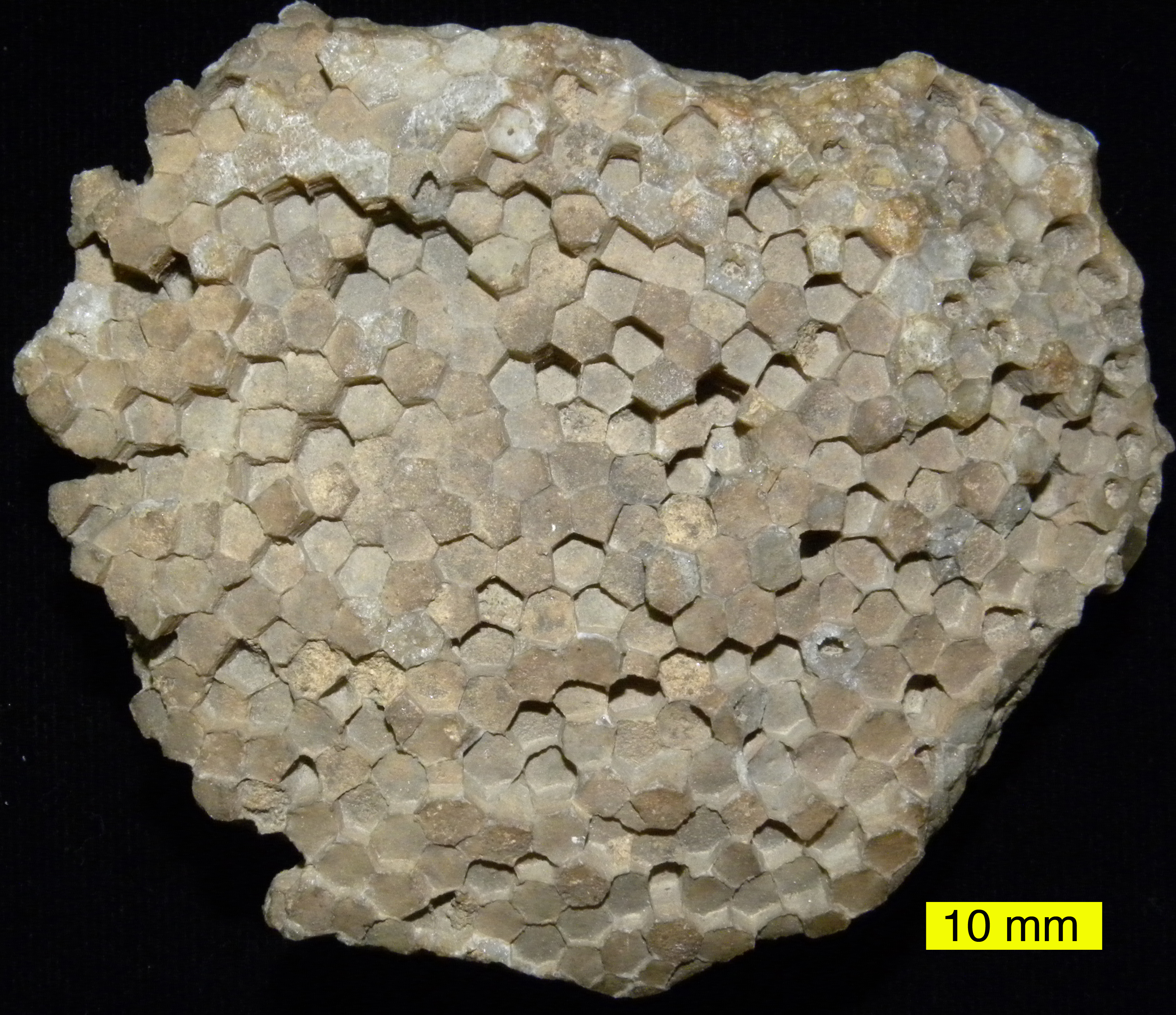
- Fossil of the Late Ordovician-Permian tabulate coral Favosites
  †Favosites
  - †Favosites arbor
  - †Favosites baculus
  - †Favosites biloculi
  - †Favosites clelandi
  - †Favosites cristatus
  - †Favosites discoideus
  - †Favosites favosus
  - †Favosites forbesi
  - †Favosites forbsei
  - †Favosites goodwini
  - †Favosites hisingeri
  - †Favosites hispidus – or unidentified comparable form
  - †Favosites impeditus
  - †Favosites mundus
  - †Favosites niagarensis
  - †Favosites occidentalis
  - †Favosites patellatus – type locality for species
  - †Favosites pirum
  - †Favosites placentus
  - †Favosites proximatus
  - †Favosites quercus
  - †Favosites ramulosus
  - †Favosites rotundituba
  - †Favosites spinigerus
  - †Favosites turbinatus
- †Fayettoceras
- †Fenestella
  - †Fenestella burlingtonensis
  - †Fenestella cestriensis
  - †Fenestella exigua
  - †Fenestella matheri
- †Fletcheria
- †Flexicalymene
  - †Flexicalymene meeki
- †Gilbertsocrinus
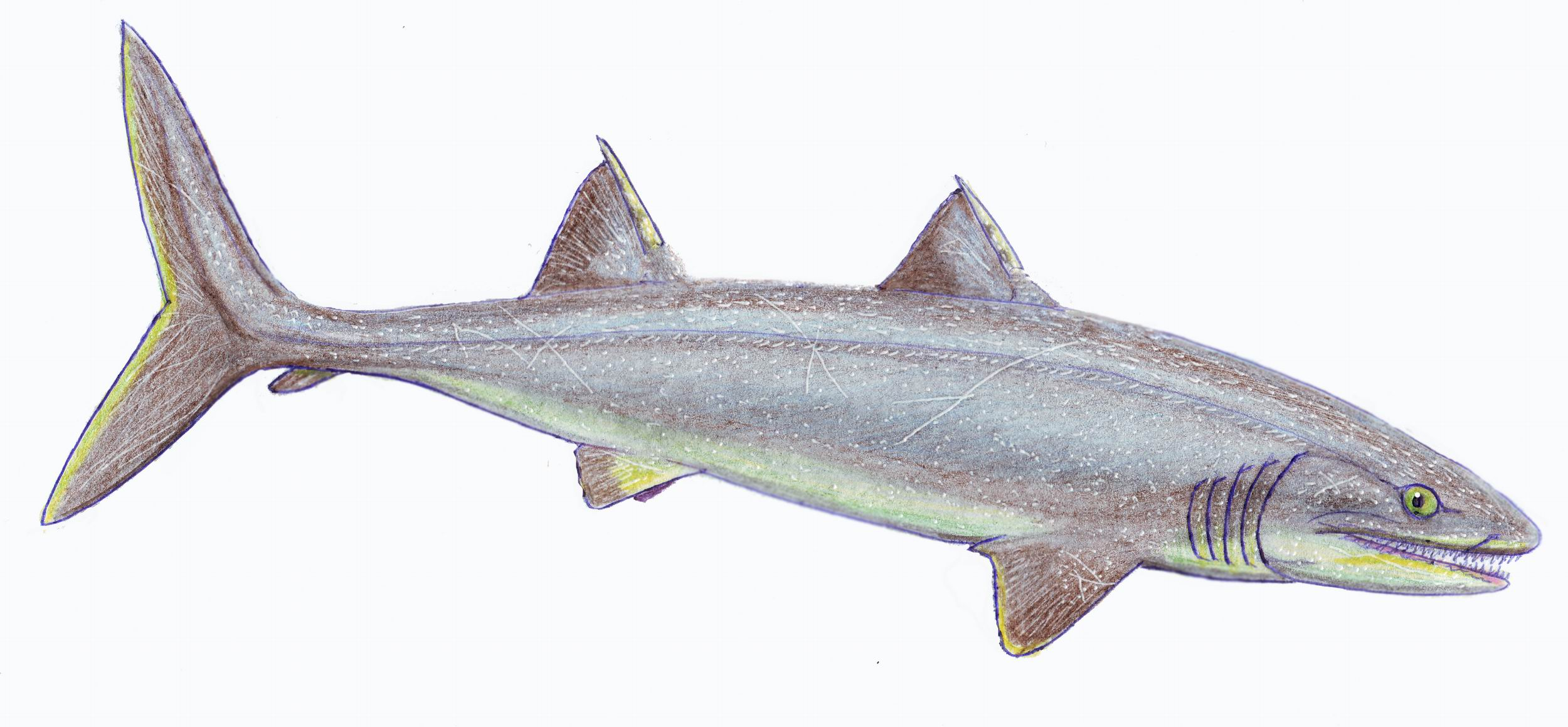
- Life restoration of the Carboniferous shark Glikmanius
  †Glikmanius
  - †Glikmanius occidentalis
- †Glyptambon
- †Glyptocrinus
- †Gomphoceras
- †Greenops
- †Grewingkia
  - †Grewingkia canadensis
  - †Grewingkia rusticum
- †Hallopora
  - †Hallopora elegantula
  - †Hallopora subnodosa
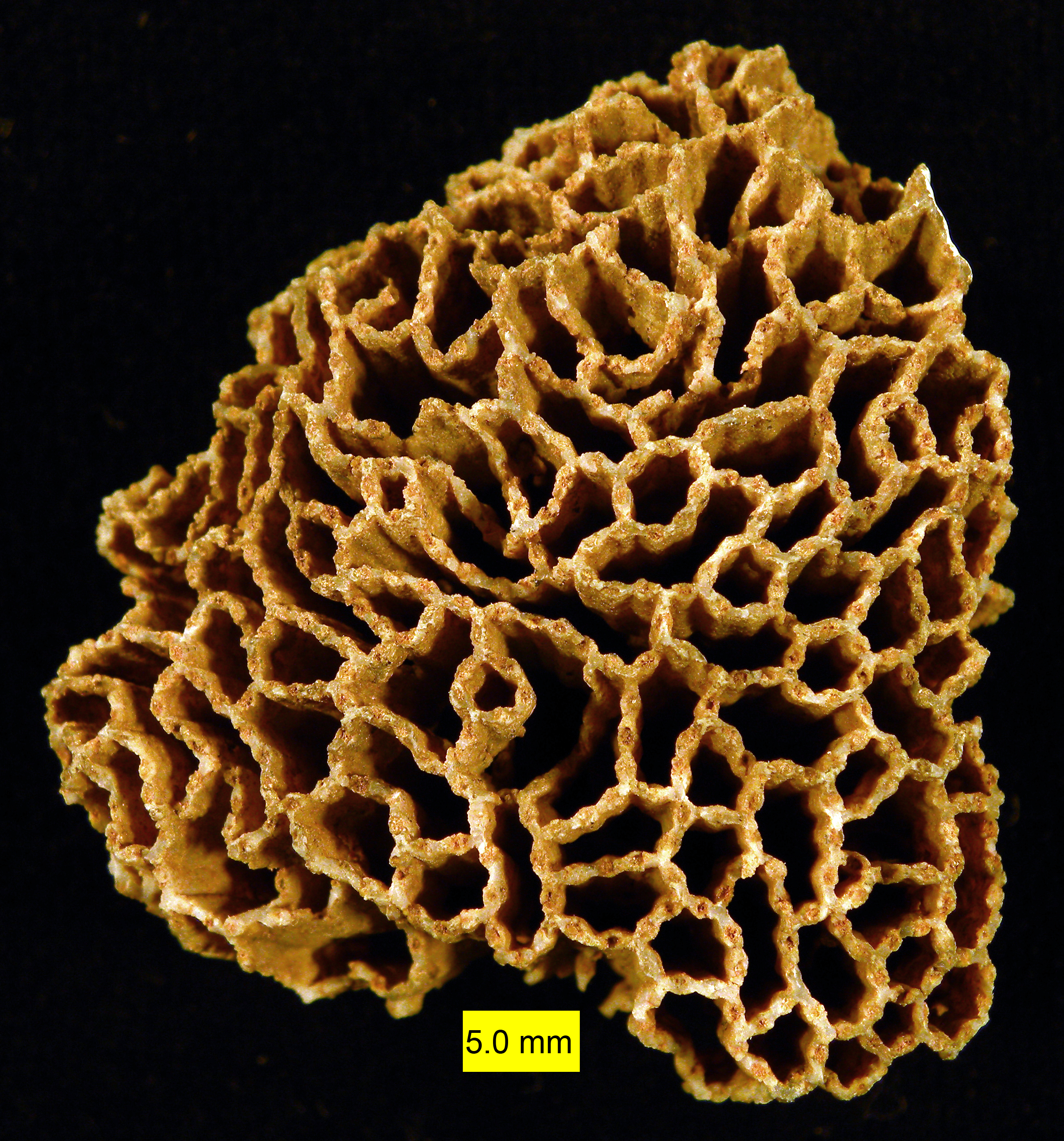
- Fossil of the Ordovician-Silurian tabulate coral Halysites
  †Halysites
  - †Halysites catenularia
  - †Halysites labyrinthicus
  - †Halysites microporus
- †Harpidium – tentative report
- †Heliophyllum
  - †Heliophyllum agassizi
  - †Heliophyllum denticulatum
  - †Heliophyllum halli
  - †Heliophyllum incrassatum
  - †Heliophyllum latericrescens
  - †Heliophyllum venatum
  - †Heliophyllum verticale
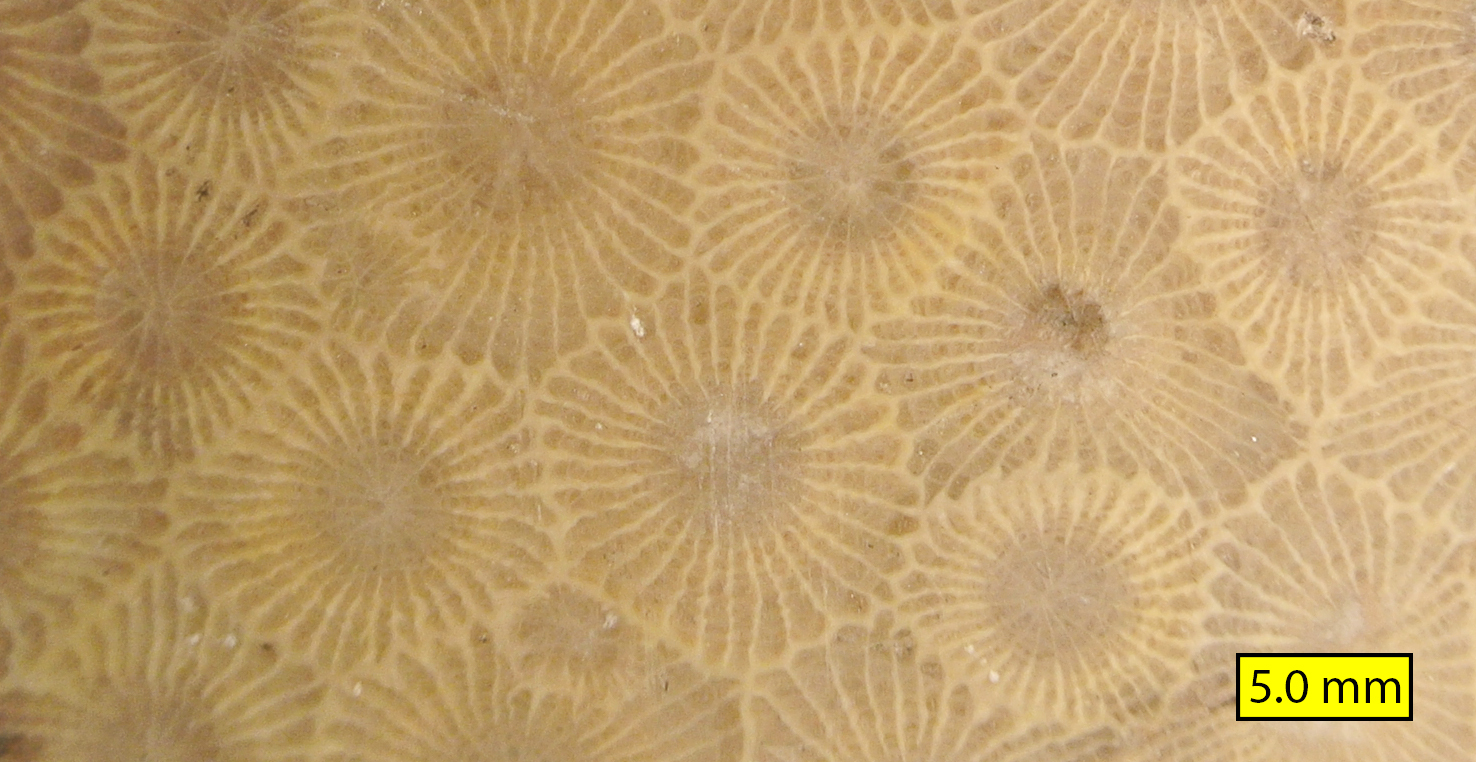
- Fossil of the Devonian colonial rugose coral Hexagonaria, also known as a Petoskey stone
  †Hexagonaria
  - †Hexagonaria bella
  - †Hexagonaria cincta
  - †Hexagonaria curta
  - †Hexagonaria ovoidea
  - †Hexagonaria partita
  - †Hexagonaria ponderosa
  - †Hexagonaria prisma
- †Hexameroceras
- †Hindia
- †Holopea
- †Hyolithes
- †Icriodus
- †Illaenus
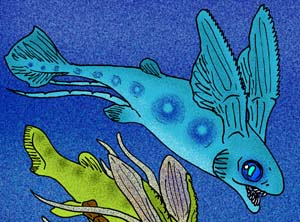
- Life restoration of the Carboniferous Chimaera relative Iniopteryx
  †Iniopteryx
  - †Iniopteryx rushlaui
- †Iocrinus
- †Isotelus
  - †Isotelus gigas
  - †Isotelus maximus
- †Kindleoceras
- †Kingstonia
- †Kionoceras
- †Kokomopterus
- †Lambeoceras
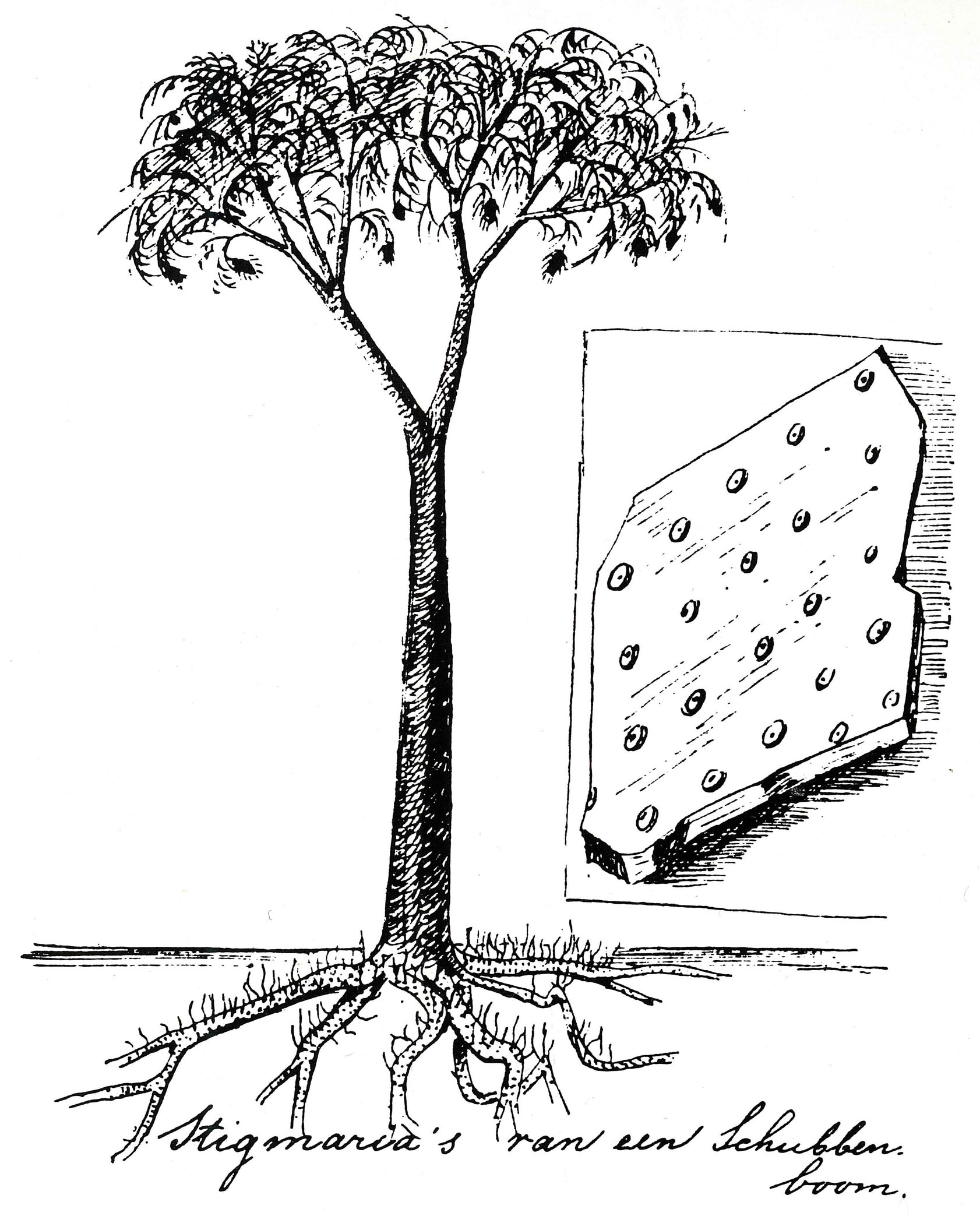
- Restoration of the Carboniferous-Late Triassic club moss relative Lepidodendron. Eli Heimans (1911).
  †Lepidodendron
  - †Lepidodendron aculeatum
  - †Lepidodendron dichotomum
  - †Lepidodendron lanceolatum – tentative report
  - †Lepidodendron obovatum
  - †Lepidodendron vestitum
- †Lepidophyllum
- †Lepidostrobus
- †Lichas
- †Lingula
- †Llanoaspis – tentative report
- †Manitoulinoceras
- †Marsupiocrinus
- †Martinia
- †Melonechinus
- †Meristella
- †Meristina
- †Microplasma
- †Mucrospirifer
  - †Mucrospirifer mucronatus
  - †Mucrospirifer profundus
  - †Mucrospirifer prolificus
- †Murchisonia
- †Natica
- †Naticopsis
  - †Naticopsis carleyana – type locality for species
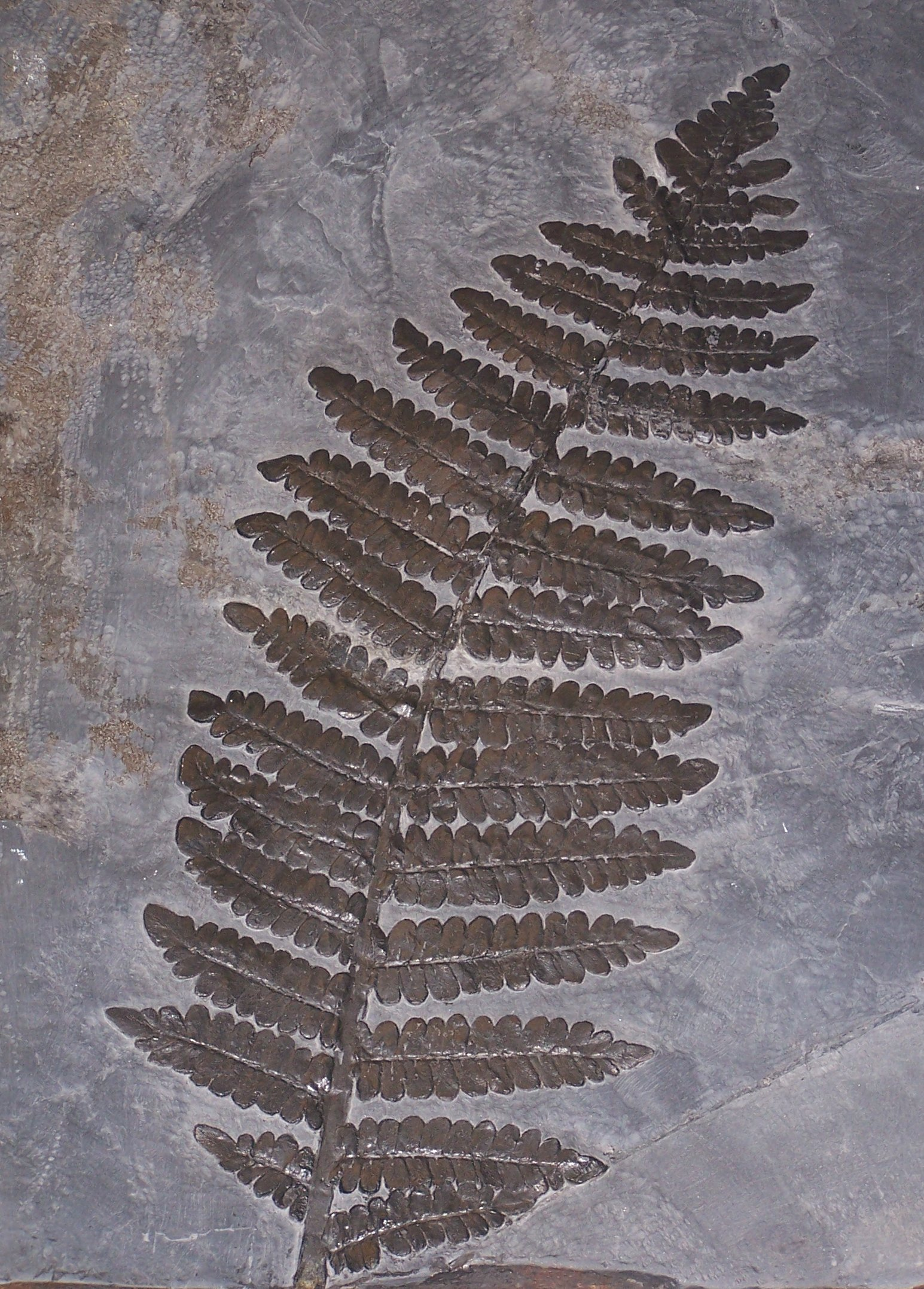
- Fossilized frond of the Carboniferous seed fern Neuropteris
  †Neuropteris
  - †Neuropteris fimbriata
  - †Neuropteris flexuosa
  - †Neuropteris heterophylla
  - †Neuropteris obliqua
  - †Neuropteris ovata
  - †Neuropteris rarinervis
  - †Neuropteris scheuchzeri
  - †Neuropteris tenuifolia
- †Odontopleura – tentative report
- †Oncoceras
- †Onychocrinus
- †Onychopterella
- †Oonoceras
- †Ornithoprion – type locality for genus
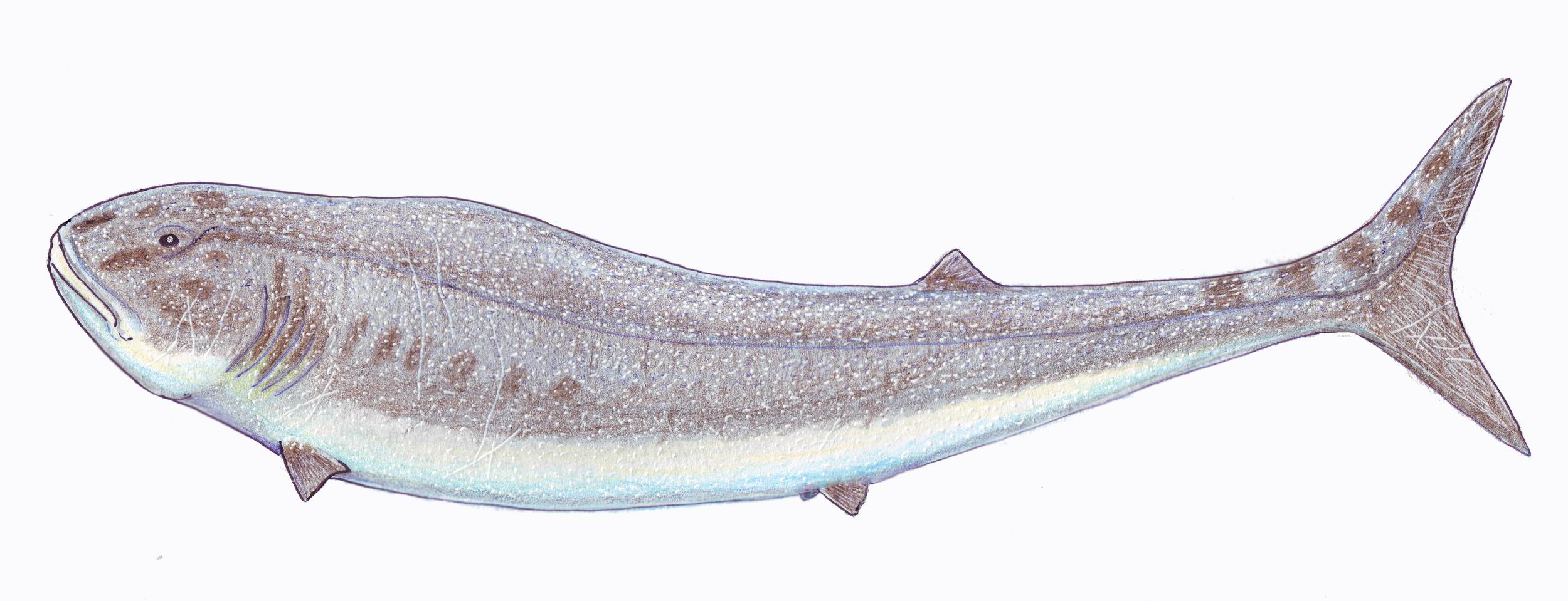
- Restoration of the Carboniferous-Permian cartilaginous fish Orodus
  †Orodus
- †Palmatolepis
- †Paolia – type locality for genus
- †Paraspirifer
- †Pecopteris
- †Pelagiella
- †Pentagonia
- †Pentameroceras
- †Pentamerus
- †Pentremites
  - †Pentremites tulipaformis
- †Periastron
- †Periechocrinus
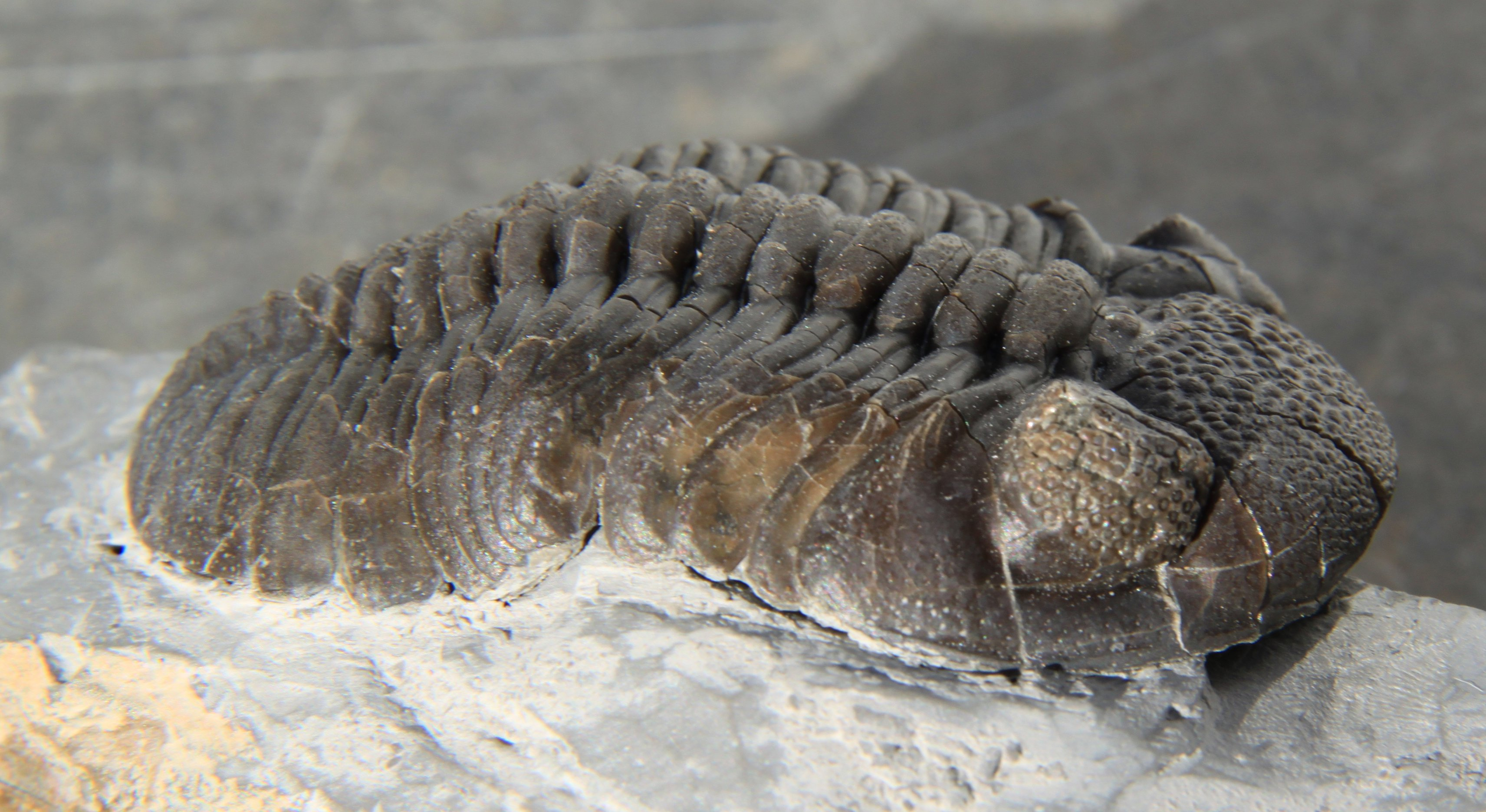
- Fossil of the Late Ordovician-Late Devonian trilobite Phacops
  †Phacops
- †Phillipsia
- †Phragmolites
- †Pinna
- †Pinnularia
- †Plaesiomys
- †Platyceras
  - †Platyceras bucculentum
- †Platycrinites
- †Platystrophia
  - †Platystrophia acutilirata
  - †Platystrophia annieana
  - †Platystrophia clarksvillensis
  - †Platystrophia cypha
  - †Platystrophia moritura
- †Plectodonta
- †Pleurodictyum
- †Pleurorthoceras
- †Poleumita
- †Polygnathus
- †Polysacos – type locality for genus
- Priscopedatus
- †Proetus
- †Protochonetes – tentative report
- †Protosalvinia
- †Psaronius
- †Pteria
- †Pterotheca
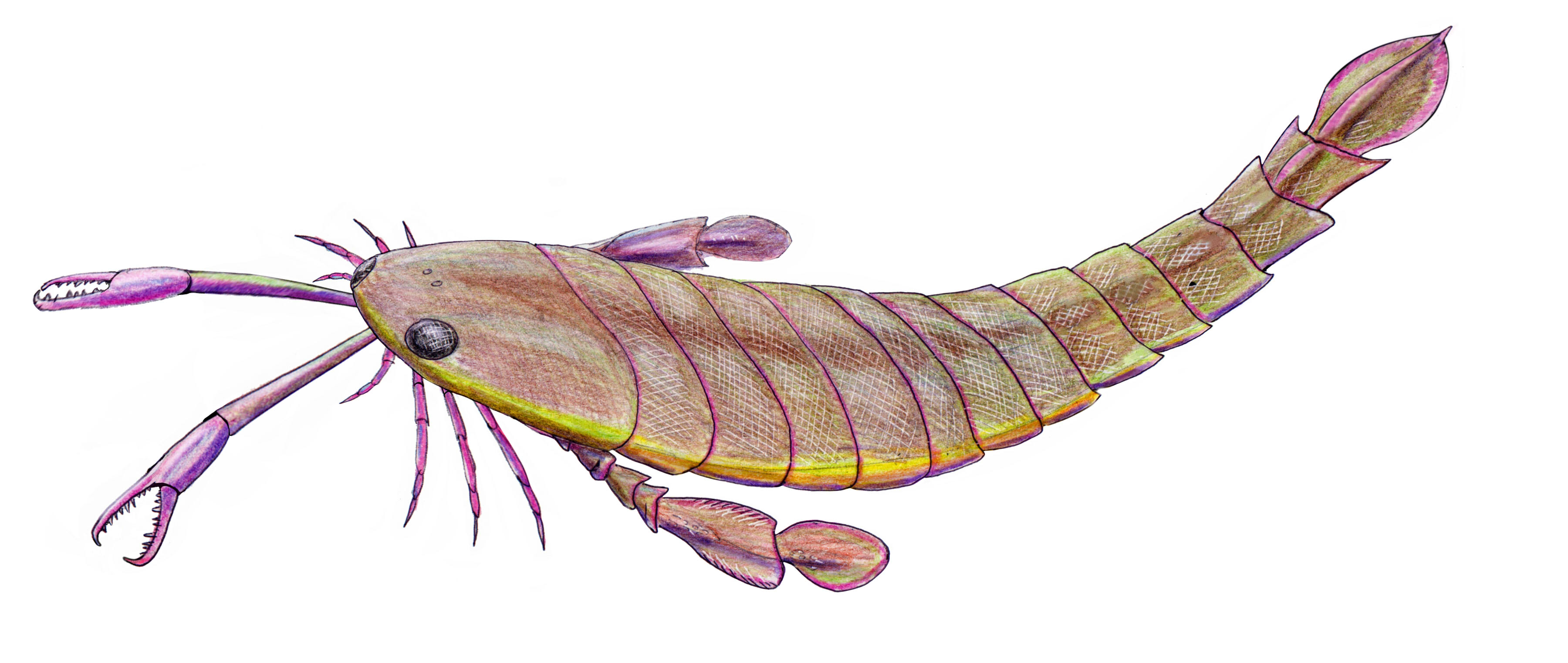
- Life restoration of the Silurian-Middle Devonian eurypterid ("sea scorpion") Pterygotus
  †Pterygotus
- †Quasillites – tentative report
- †Retzia
- †Rhadinichthys
- †Rhynchonella
- †Richmondoceras – type locality for genus
- †Rineceras
- †Rota
- †Samaropsis
- †Sandalodus
- †Scytalocrinus
- †Sidetes
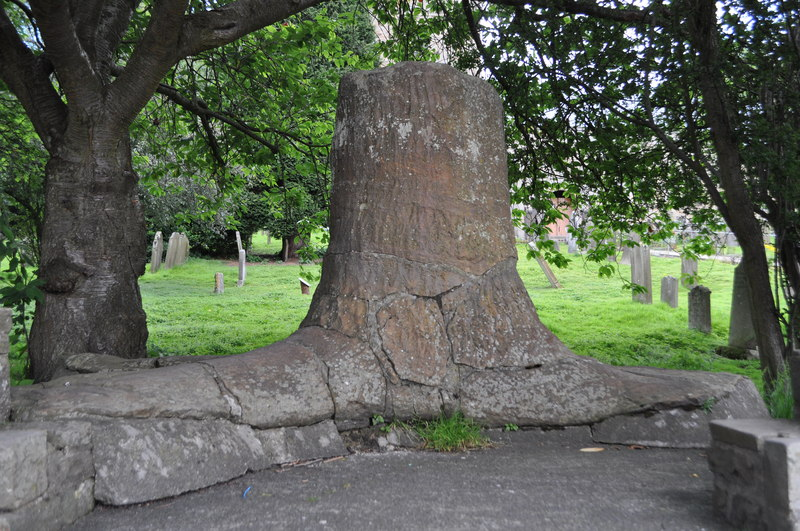
- Fossilized stump of the Carboniferous-Permian club moss relative Sigillaria
  †Sigillaria
  - †Sigillaria brardii
  - †Sigillaria scutellata
- †Skenidioides
- †Sowerbyella
- †Spathognathodus
- †Sphaerexochus
- †Sphaerocodium
- †Sphenophyllum
  - †Sphenophyllum cuneifolium
  - †Sphenophyllum emarginatum
  - †Sphenophyllum myriophyllum
  - †Sphenophyllum plurifoliatum
- †Sphenopteris
- †Spirifer
- Spirorbis
- †Spyroceras
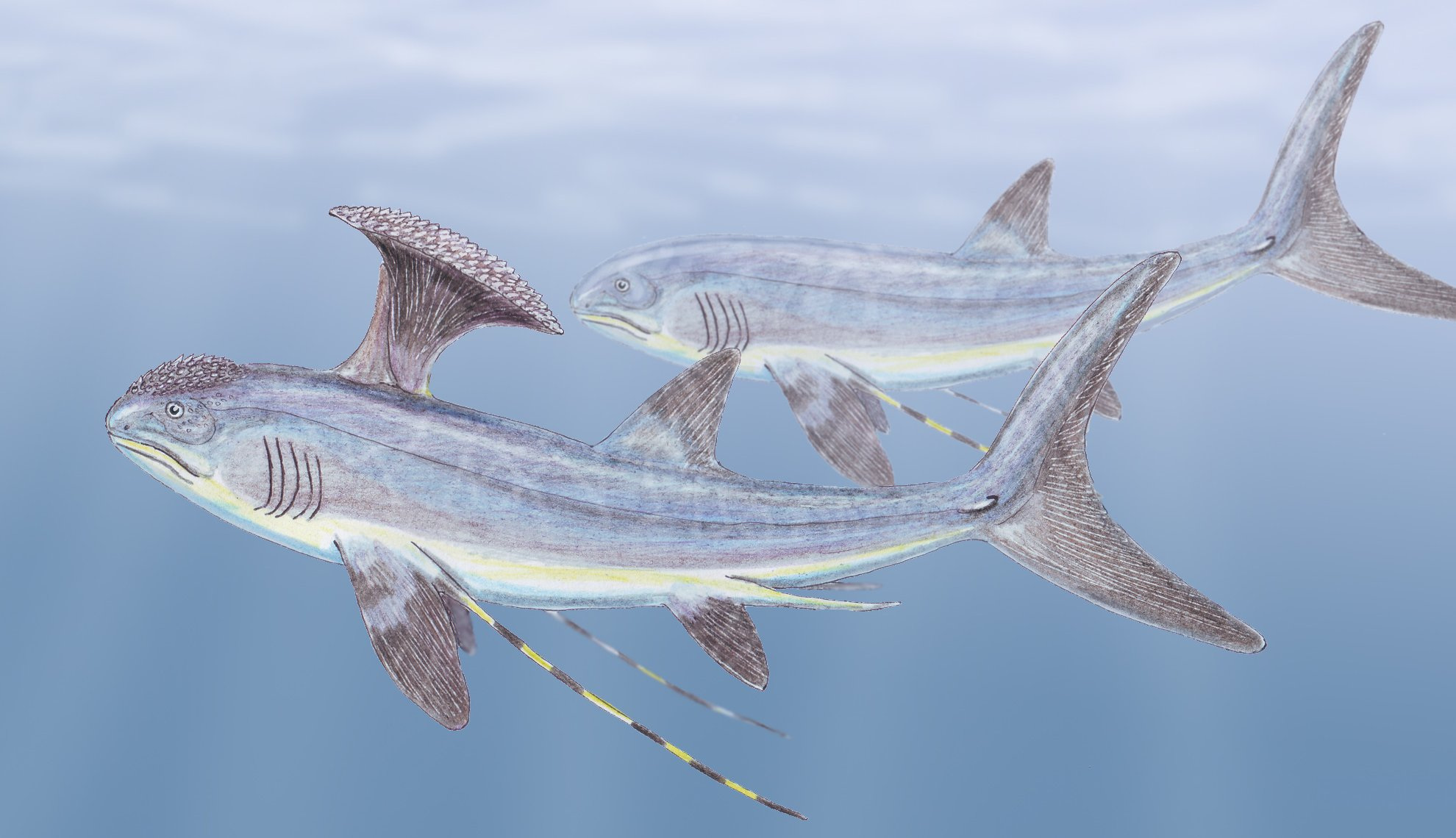
- Life restorations of a male (foreground) and female (background) of the Late Devonian-Carboniferous Chimaera relative Stethacanthus
  †Stethacanthus
  - †Stethacanthus altonensis
- †Stigmaria
- †Stigmatella
- †Strophomena
  - †Strophomena concordensis
  - †Strophomena erratica
  - †Strophomena extenuata
  - †Strophomena neglecta
  - †Strophomena nutans
  - †Strophomena planumbona
  - †Strophomena sulcata
- †Syringopora
- †Taxocrinus
- †Tentaculites
- †Tetradium
- †Thalassinoides
- †Treptoceras
- †Tricrepicephalus
- †Trimerus
- †Zittelloceras
- †Zoophycos

== Mesozoic ==
The Paleobiology Database records no known occurrences of Mesozoic fossils in Indiana.

== Cenozoic ==
- Acer
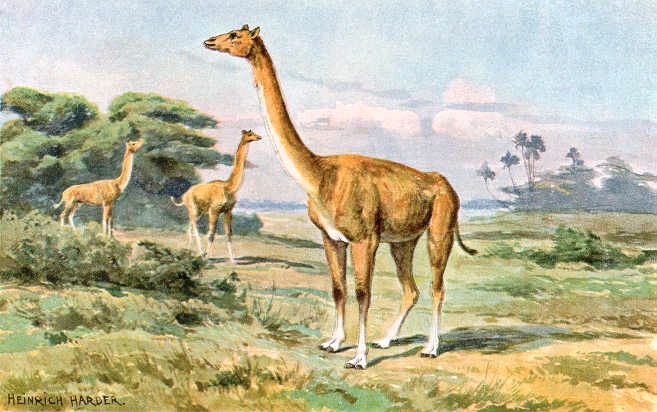
- Life restoration of the Miocene camel Aepycamelus, or the long-necked camel. Heinrich Harder (1920).
  †Aepycamelus – or unidentified comparable form
- Alces
  - †Alces alces
- †Arctodus
  - †Arctodus simus
- †Bensonomys
  - †Bensonomys hershkovitzi – type locality for species
- †Bootherium
  - †Bootherium bombifrons
- †Borophagus
- †Bryum
- Bufo
- Candona
  - †Candona crogmaniana – or unidentified comparable form
  - †Candona elliptica – or unidentified related form
- Canis
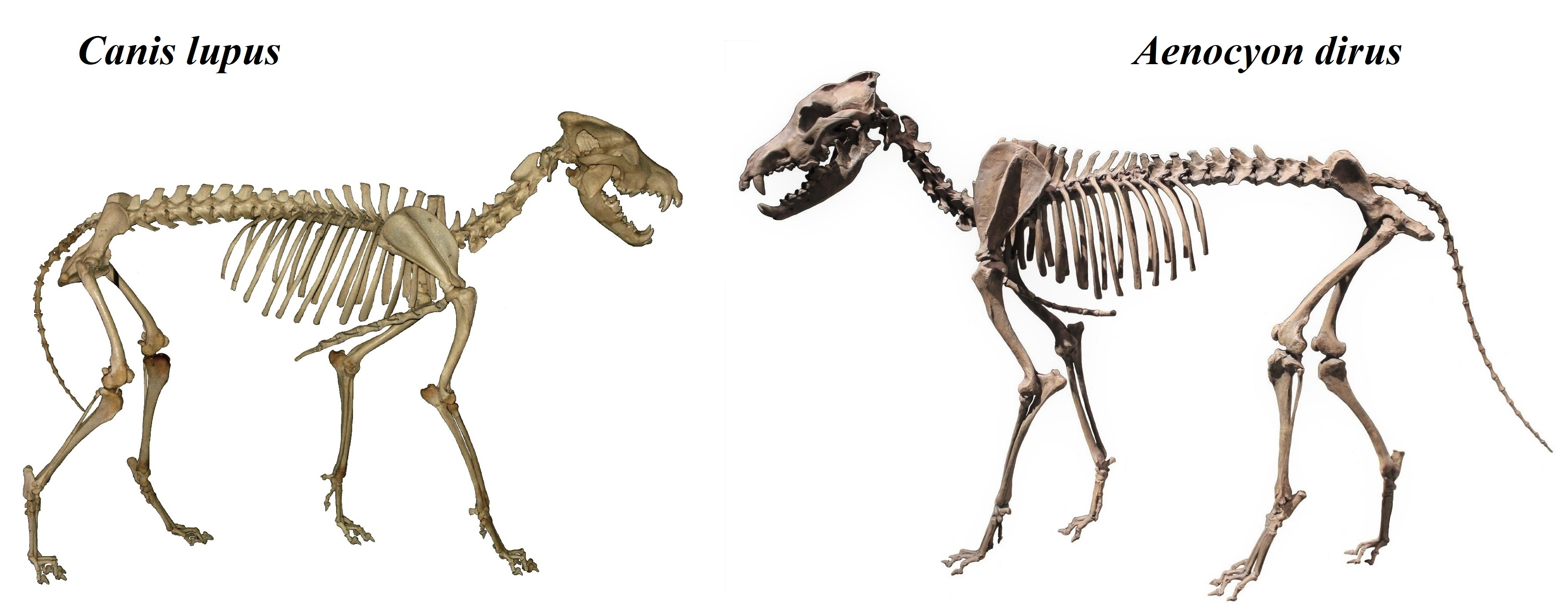
  - Modern mounted skeleton of Canis lupus, the grey wolf, to scale with a fossilized skeleton of the Pleistocene wolf Canis dirus, or dire wolf
    †Canis dirus – or unidentified comparable form
  - †Canis latrans – or unidentified comparable form
  - †Canis lupus
- †Carex
- Carya
- Chara
- Chelydra
  - †Chelydra serpentina – or unidentified comparable form
- Chrysemys
  - †Chrysemys picta – or unidentified comparable form
- Coluber
  - †Coluber constrictor
- Comptonia – or unidentified comparable form
- Cyperus
- Cypridopsis
  - †Cypridopsis okeechobei – or unidentified related form
  - †Cypridopsis vidua – or unidentified comparable form
- Elaphe
- Emydoidea
  - †Emydoidea blandingii – or unidentified comparable form
- Equus
  - †Equus complicatus – or unidentified comparable form
- Fagus
  - †Fagus grandifolia – or unidentified comparable form
- Geomys
  - †Geomys adamsi – or unidentified comparable form
  - †Geomys bursarius – or unidentified comparable form
- †Hemiauchenia – or unidentified comparable form
- †Hesperotestudo
- †Hypolagus
  - †Hypolagus fontinalis – or unidentified comparable form
- Lynx
  - †Lynx rufus – or unidentified comparable form
- Lyonia – or unidentified comparable form
- †Mammut
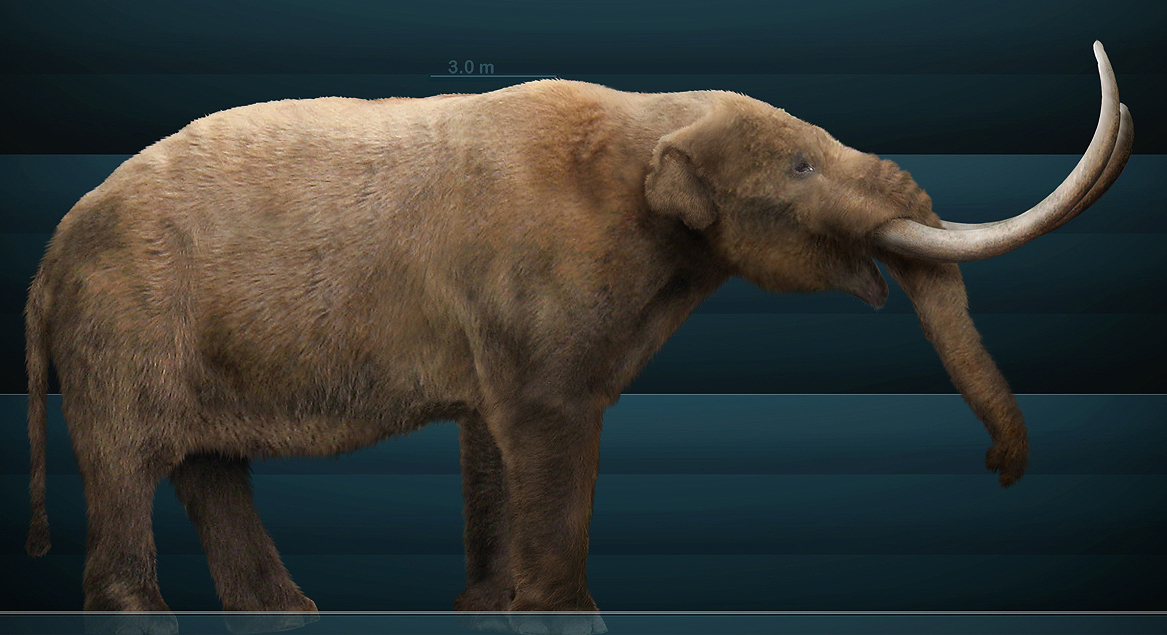
  - Restoration of a Mammut americanum, or American mastodon
    †Mammut americanum
- Marmota
  - †Marmota monax
- Mephitis
  - †Mephitis mephitis
- Microtus
  - †Microtus ochrogaster – or unidentified comparable form
- Mustela
- †Mylohyus
  - †Mylohyus fossilis
- Neotoma
  - †Neotoma floridana – or unidentified comparable form
- Nerodia
  - †Nerodia erythrogaster – or unidentified comparable form
- Odocoileus
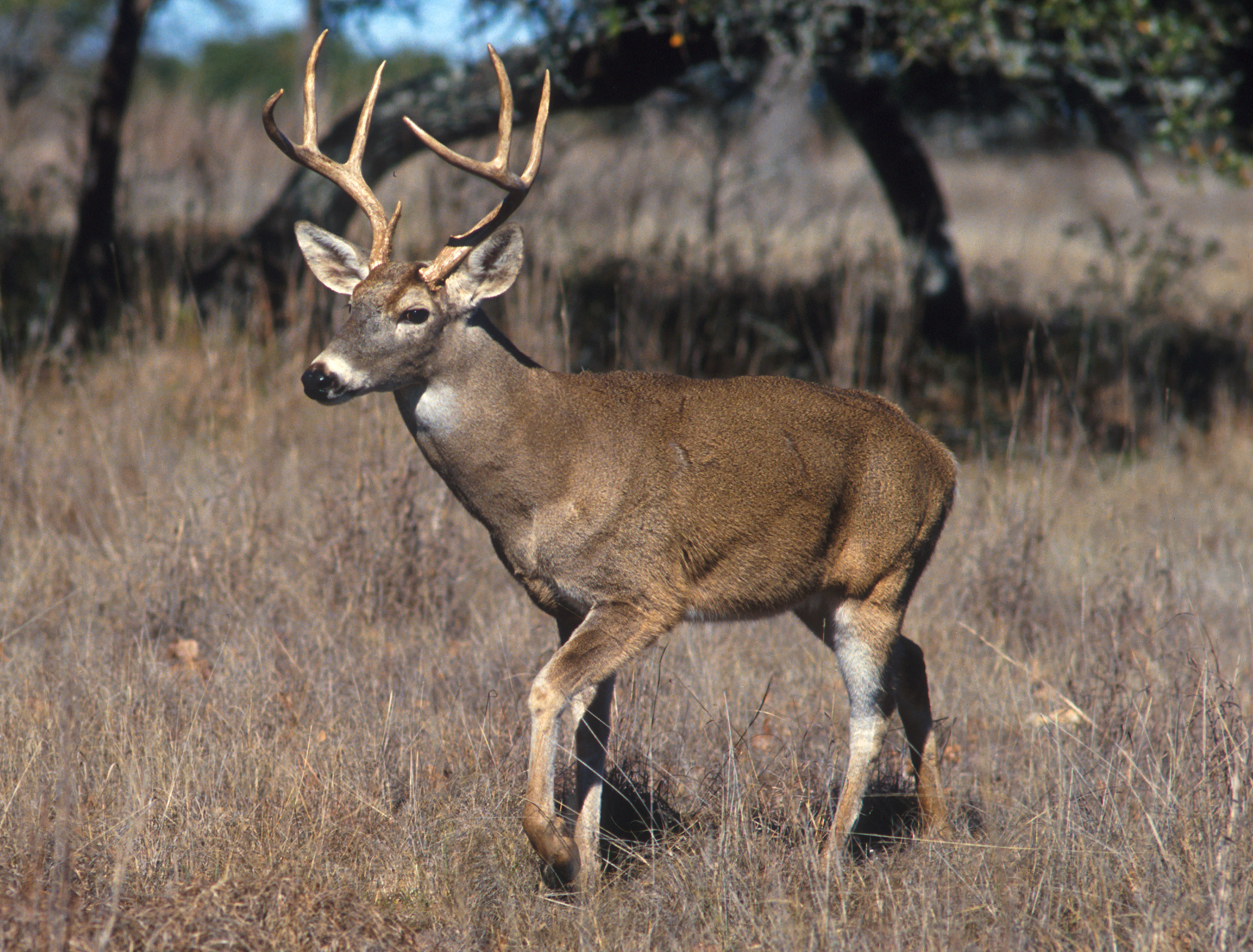
  - A living Odocoileus virginianus, or white-tailed deer
    †Odocoileus virginianus
- Ogmodontomys
  - †Ogmodontomys pipecreekensis – type locality for species
- †Oxalis
- †Paleoheterodon
  - †Paleoheterodon tiheni
- Panthera
  - †Panthera onca
- †Paracoluber
  - †Paracoluber storei
- Parascalops
  - †Parascalops breweri
- Peromyscus
  - †Peromyscus leucopus – or unidentified comparable form
- Platanus
  - †Platanus occidentalis
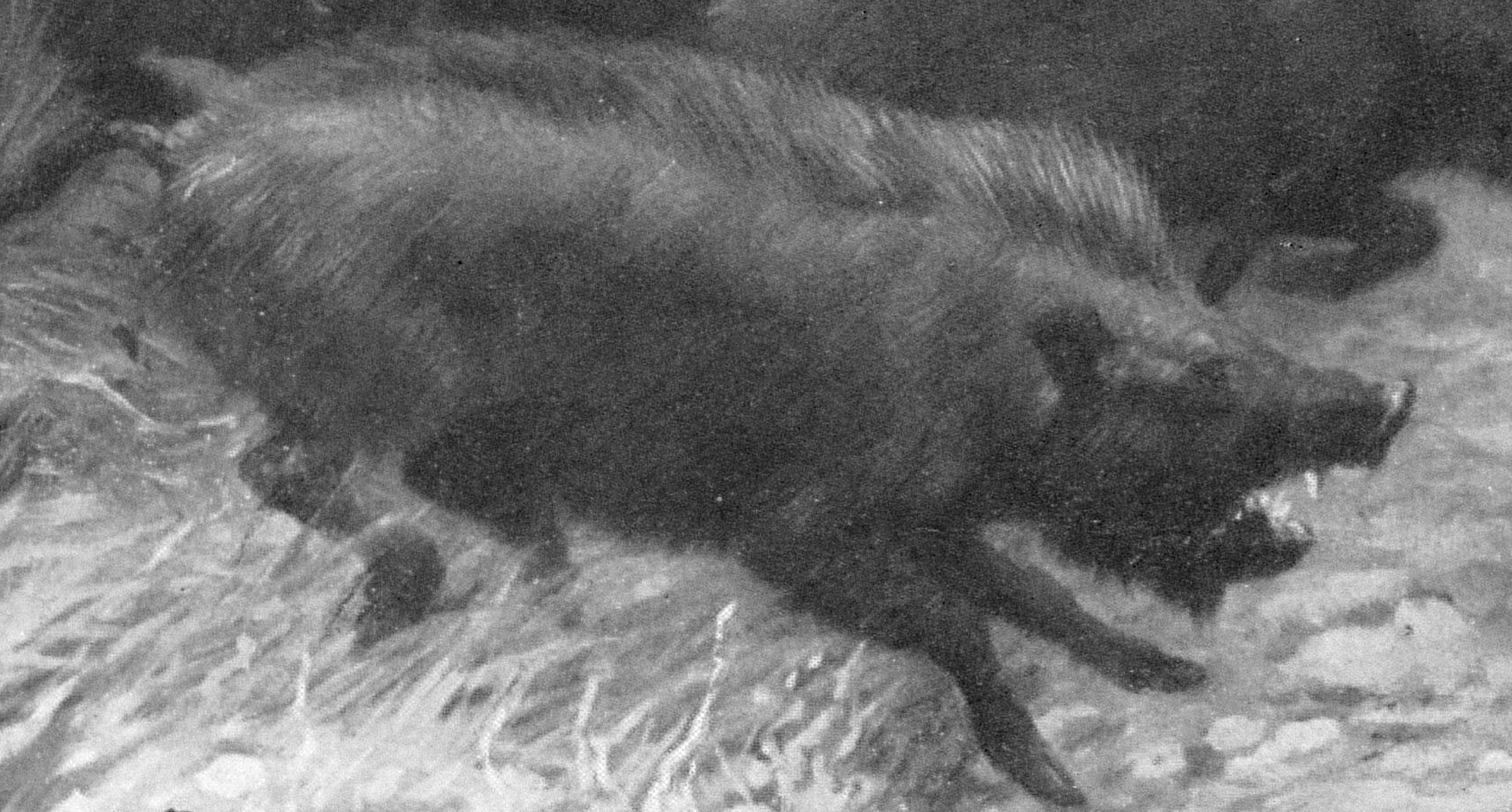
- Restoration of a herd of alarmed Miocene-Pleistocene peccaries of the genus Platygonus. Charles R. Knight (1922).
  †Platygonus
  - †Platygonus vetus – or unidentified comparable form
- †Plionarctos
  - †Plionarctos edensis
- †Pliophenacomys
  - †Pliophenacomys koenigswaldi – type locality for species
- Polygonum
- Populus
  - †Populus deltoides – or unidentified comparable form
- †Potamocypris
  - †Potamocypris unicaudata – or unidentified related form
- †Potamogeton
- †Potentilla
- †Rana
  - †Rana catesbeiana – or unidentified comparable form
- Rumex
- Salix
- †Scirpus
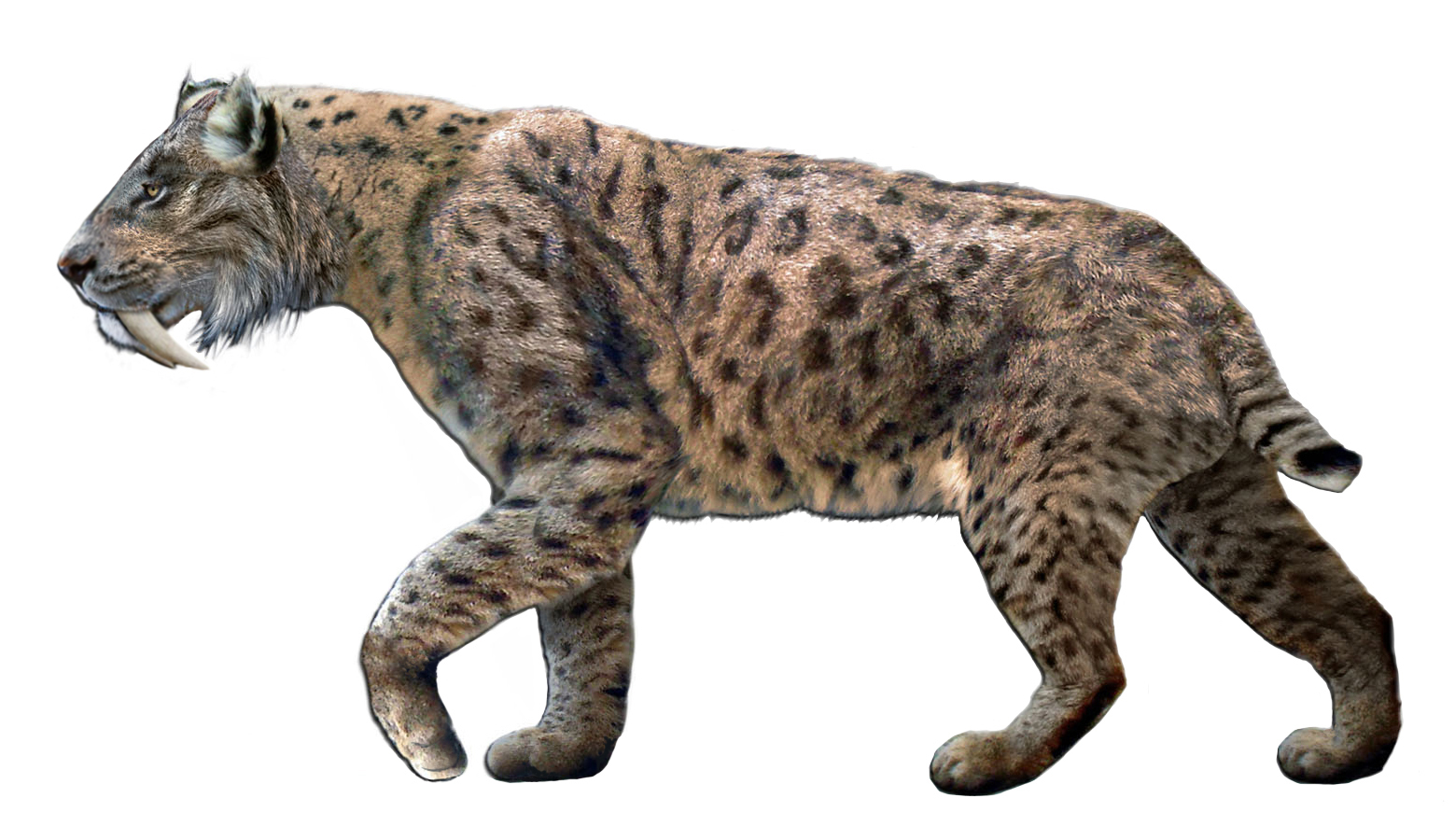
- Life restoration of the Pleistocene-Holocene saber-tooth cat Smilodon
  †Smilodon
  - †Smilodon fatalis
- Spermophilus
  - †Spermophilus howelli
- Spilogale
  - †Spilogale putorius – or unidentified comparable form
- †Symmetrodontomys
  - †Symmetrodontomys daamsi – type locality for species
- Synaptomys
  - †Synaptomys cooperi
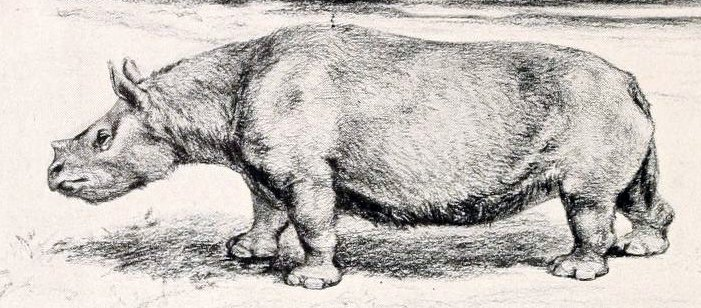
- Restoration of the Miocene-Pliocene rhinoceros Teleoceras
  †Teleoceras
- Thamnophis
- Trachemys
  - †Trachemys scripta – or unidentified comparable form
- Urocyon
  - †Urocyon cinereoargenteus
- Ursus
  - †Ursus americanus – or unidentified comparable form
- †Verbena
- †Viola
- Vitis
- Vulpes
- †Xanthium
