= Richmondoceras =

Richmondoceras Temporal range: Ordovician-Silurian

Scientific classification
- Kingdom: Animalia
- Phylum: Mollusca
- Class: Cephalopoda
- Order: †Orthocerida
- Genus: †Richmondoceras; Frey (1995)

Richmondoceras is an extinct genus of actively mobile carnivorous cephalopods, essentially a Nautiloid, that lived in what would be North America during the Ordovician and Silurian from 449.5—443.7 mya, existing for approximately 5.8 million years.

== Taxonomy ==
Richmondoceras was named by Frey (1995). Its type is Richmondoceras brevicameratum. It was assigned to Orthocerida by Frey (1995).

== Morphology ==
The shell is usually long, and may be straight ("orthoconic") or gently curved. In life, these animals may have been similar to the modern squid, except for the long shell.

== Fossil distribution ==
Fossil distribution is exclusive to Indiana, USA.
