= Bordonia =

Scientific classification
- Kingdom: Animalia
- Phylum: Arthropoda
- Class: Insecta
- Order: Coleoptera
- Suborder: Polyphaga
- Infraorder: Elateriformia
- Family: Buprestidae
- Genus: Bordonia; Cobos, 1980

Genus of beetles

Bordonia is a genus of beetles in the family Buprestidae, containing the following species:

- Bordonia descarpentriesi Cobos, 1980
- Bordonia venezolana Cobos, 1980
