= Eospirifer =

Eospirifer Temporal range: middle Silurian - early Devonian

Scientific classification
- Domain: Eukaryota
- Kingdom: Animalia
- Phylum: Brachiopoda
- Class: Rhynchonellata
- Order: †Spiriferinida
- Suborder: †Cyrtinidina
- Superfamily: †Cyrtinoidea
- Family: †Cyrtinidae
- Genus: †Eospirifer; Schuchert, 1913

Species
- Eospirifer radiatus; Eospirifer dasifiliformis; Eospirifer lachrymose; Eospirifer praecursor

Extinct genus of brachiopods

Eospirifer is a genus of extinct brachiopod in the class Rhynchonellata (Articulata) and the order Spiriferida. Their fossils occur most commonly in marine calcareous, microbialitic mudstones with extensive mudcracks or shelly packstones, generally mid-Silurian to early-Devonian in age.

== Select species ==
- Eospirifer radiatus
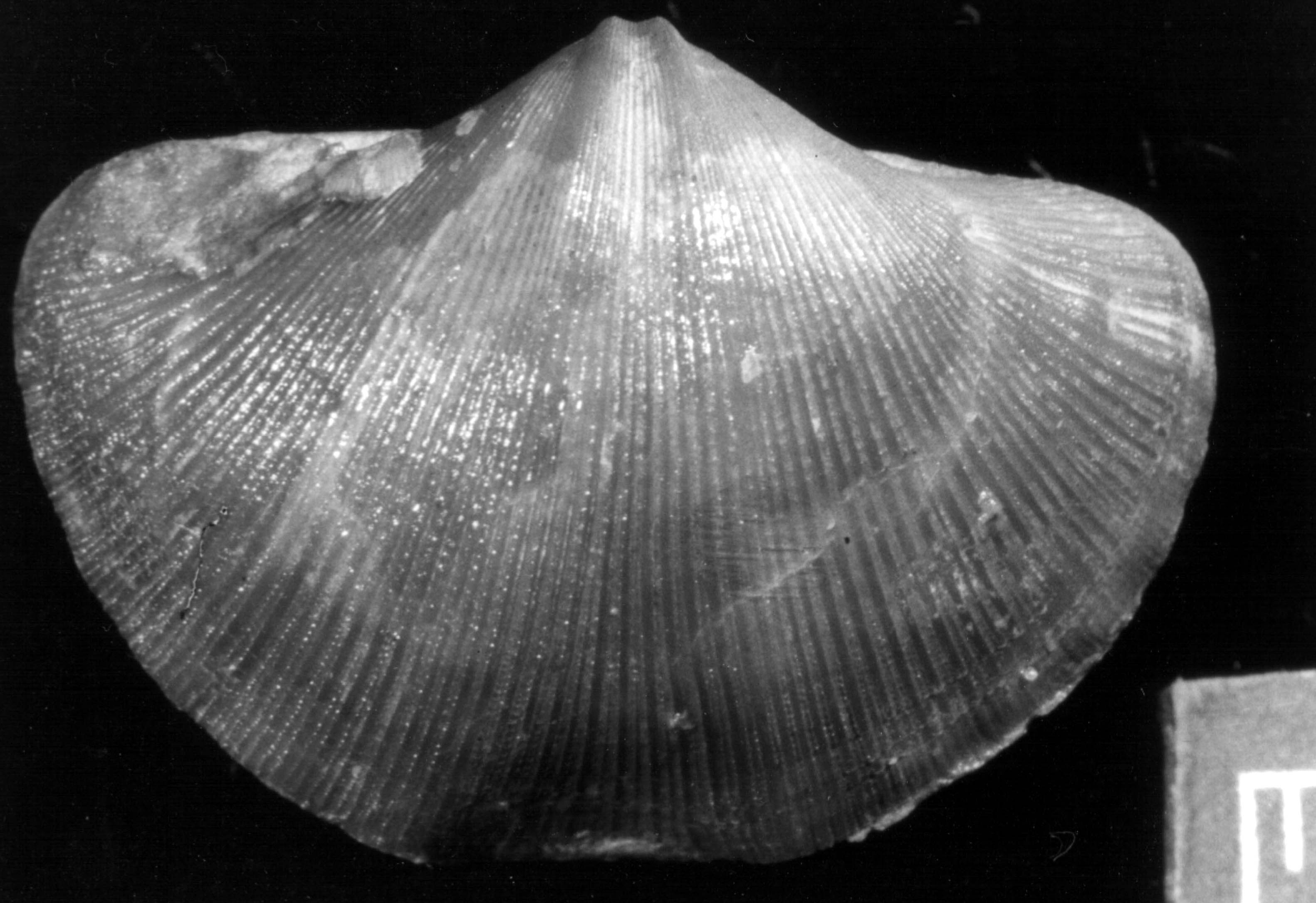
  Eospirifer radiatus
- Eospirifer dasifiliformis
- Eospirifer lachrymose
- Eospirifer praecursor
