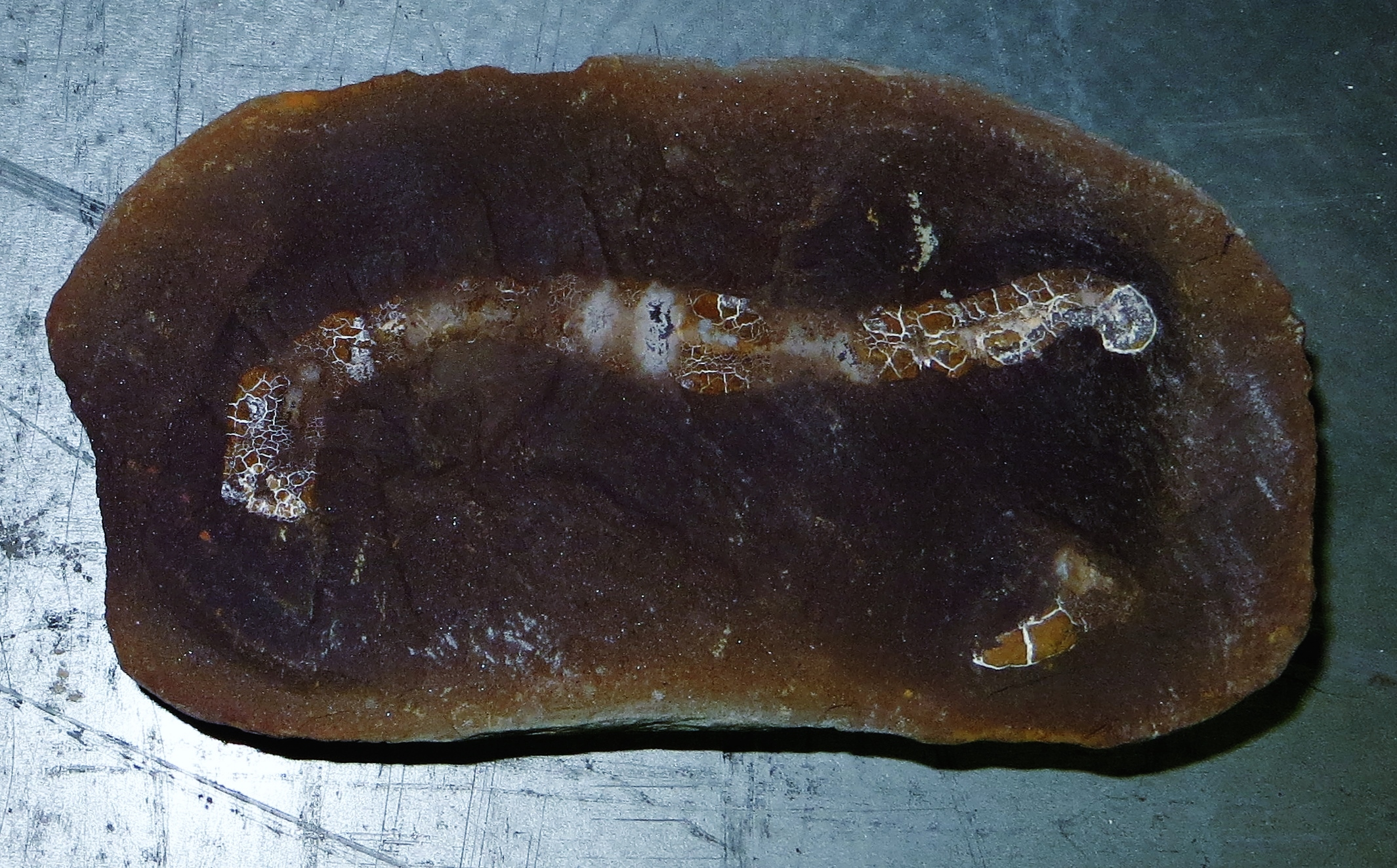

Scientific classification
- Domain: Eukaryota
- Kingdom: Animalia
- Phylum: Echinodermata
- Class: Holothuroidea
- Order: Apodida
- Family: †Achistridae
- Genus: †Achistrum; Etheridge, 1881

= Achistrum =

Extinct genus of sea cucumbers

Achistrum is an extinct genus of sea cucumber which existed in Poland during the Triassic period, and the United States during the Carboniferous period. It contains the species Achistrum nicholsoni and Achistrum ludwigi.
