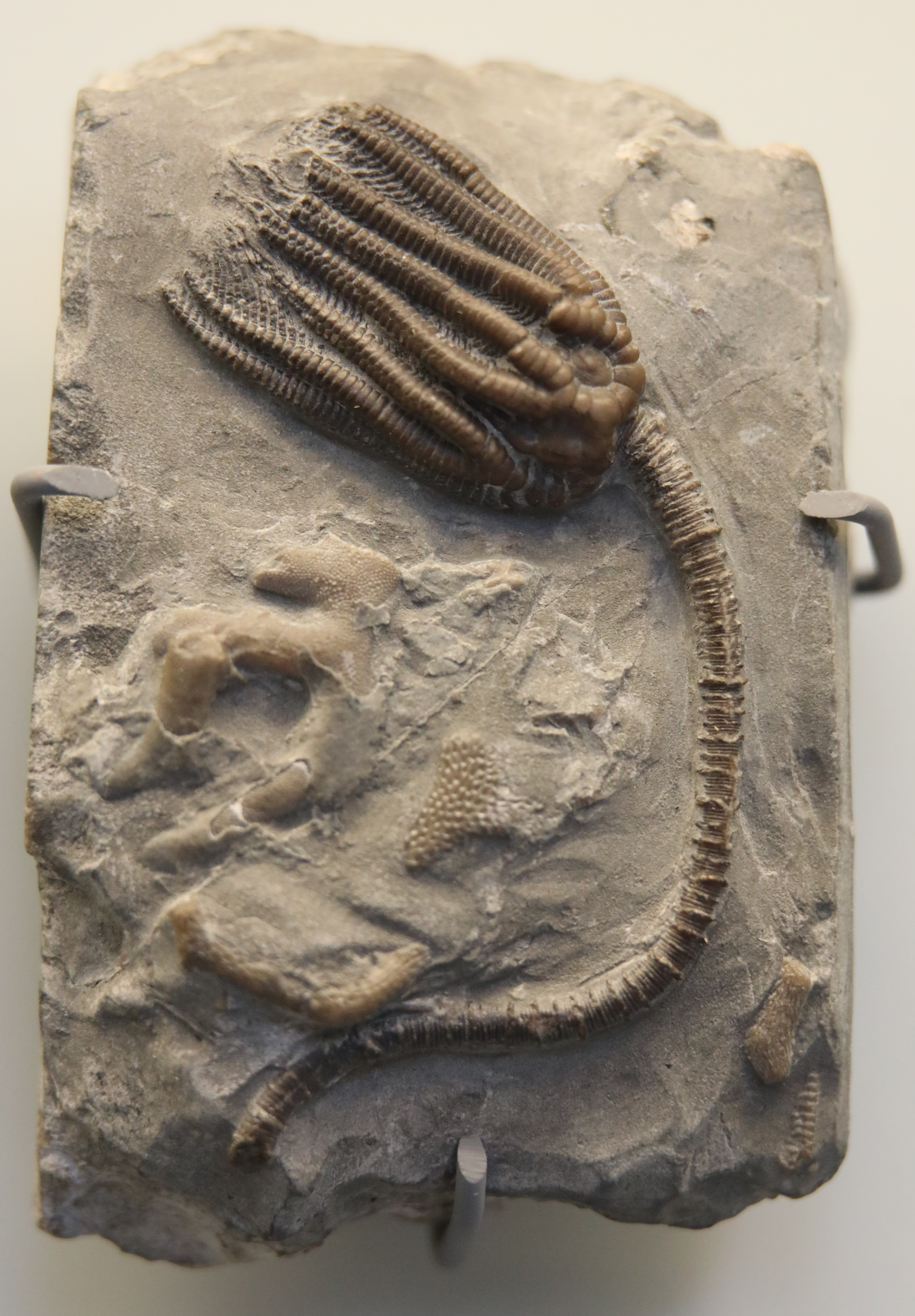
- Dimerocrinites decadactylus fossil

Scientific classification
- Kingdom: Animalia
- Phylum: Echinodermata
- Class: Crinoidea
- Order: †Diplobathrida
- Genus: †Dimerocrinites

= Dimerocrinites =

Dimerocrinites Temporal range: Silurian - Early Devonian

Extinct genus of crinoids

Dimerocrinites is an extinct genus of crinoids that lived from the Silurian to the Early Devonian of Australia and North America.

== Sources ==
- Fossils (Smithsonian Handbooks) by David Ward (Page 166)
