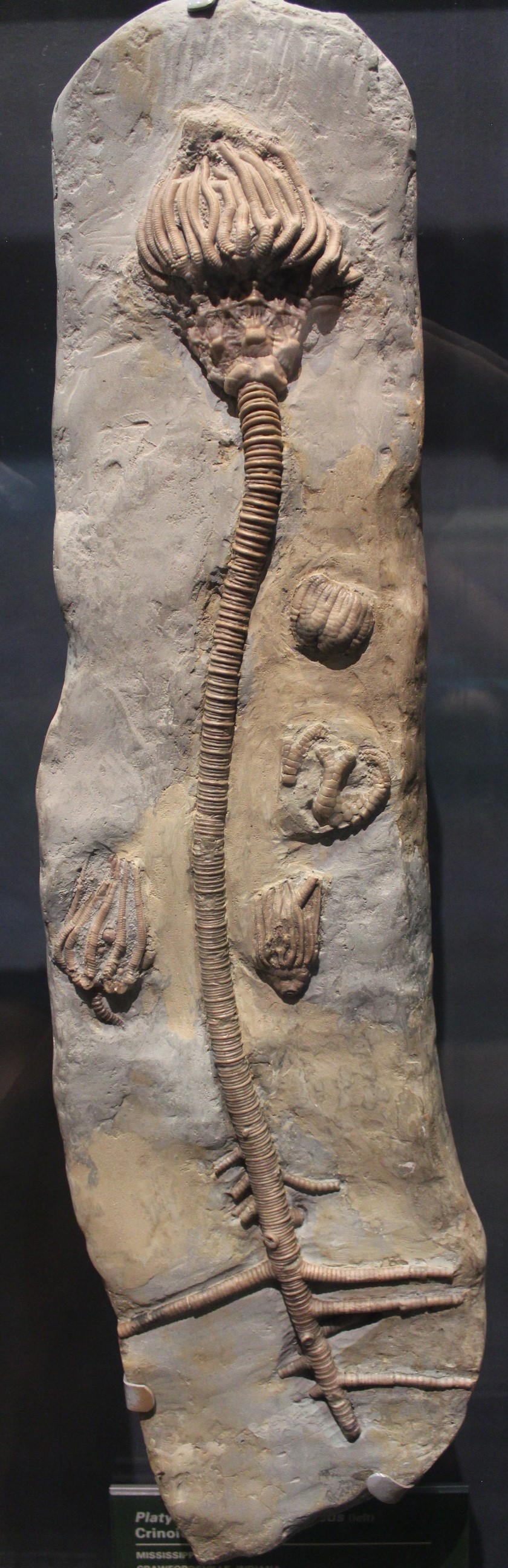
- A. gibsoni, National Museum of Natural History

Scientific classification
- Kingdom: Animalia
- Phylum: Echinodermata
- Class: Crinoidea
- Order: †Monobathrida
- Family: †Actinocrinitidae
- Genus: †Actinocrinites; Miller, 1821

= Actinocrinites =

Actinocrinites Temporal range: Devonian - Permian

Extinct genus of crinoids

Actinocrinites (from Greek: ἀκτίς aktís, 'ray' and Greek: κρῖνον krinon 'lily') is an extinct genus of crinoids.

== Fossil records ==
This genus is known in the fossil record from the Devonian period to the Permian period (age range: 360.7 to 290.1 million years ago). Fossils of species within this genus have been found in Australia, China, Europe and United States.

== Species ==
Species within this genus include:

- †Actinocrinites batheri Whidborne 1896
- †Actinocrinites brouweri Wanner 1924
- †Actinocrinites zhaoae Waters et al. 2003
- †Actinocrinites triacontadactylus
