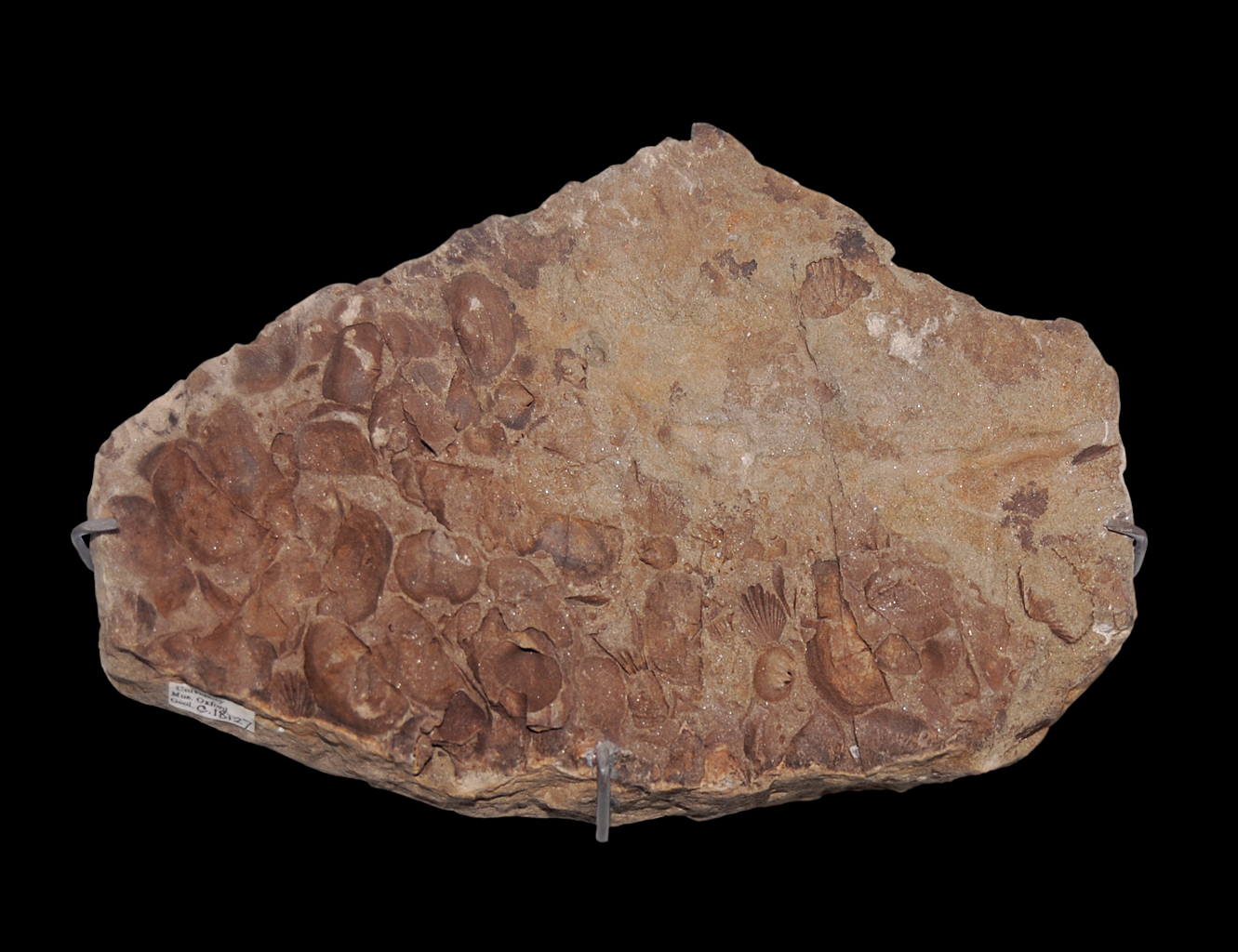
- Isorthis and Protochonetes. Silurian reef fauna. Fossil in the Oxford University natural history museum

Scientific classification
- Kingdom: Animalia
- Phylum: Brachiopoda
- Class: †Strophomenata
- Order: †Productida
- Family: †Strophochonetidae
- Subfamily: †Protochonetinae
- Genus: †Protochonetes; Muir-Wood, 1962

Species
- P. ludloviensis Muir-Wood, 1962 (type); P. harricanensis Jin et al., 1993; P. elyensis Sheehan, 1982; P. striatellus (Dalman, 1828); P. piltenensis Rybnikova, 1967; P. minimus (Sowerby, 1839); P. novoscotius; P. ceratoides; P. latus

= Protochonetes =

Protochonetes Temporal range: Silurian-Devonian

Extinct genus of brachiopods

Protochonetes is an extinct genus of brachiopods. Its shell was lined with spines.
