= Sandalodus =

Sandalodus Temporal range: Late Devonian–Permian

Scientific classification
- Kingdom: Animalia
- Phylum: Chordata
- Class: Chondrichthyes
- Subclass: Holocephali
- Order: †Cochliodontiformes
- Family: †Cochliodontidae
- Genus: †Sandalodus; Newberry & Worthen, 1866

Extinct genus of cartilaginous fishes

Sandalodus is an extinct genus of cartilaginous fish from the Late Devonian, Carboniferous and Permian periods. It was named by John Strong Newberry and Amos Henry Worthen in 1866. Charles Eastman classified the genus as a member of Cochliodontidae in 1903, which has been followed by subsequent authors. Some species of the genus have been found to belong to the same animal as Deltodus, and the genus' validity has been questioned.

== Species ==
- Sandalodus carbonarius
- Sandalodus complanatus
- Sandalodus laevissimus
