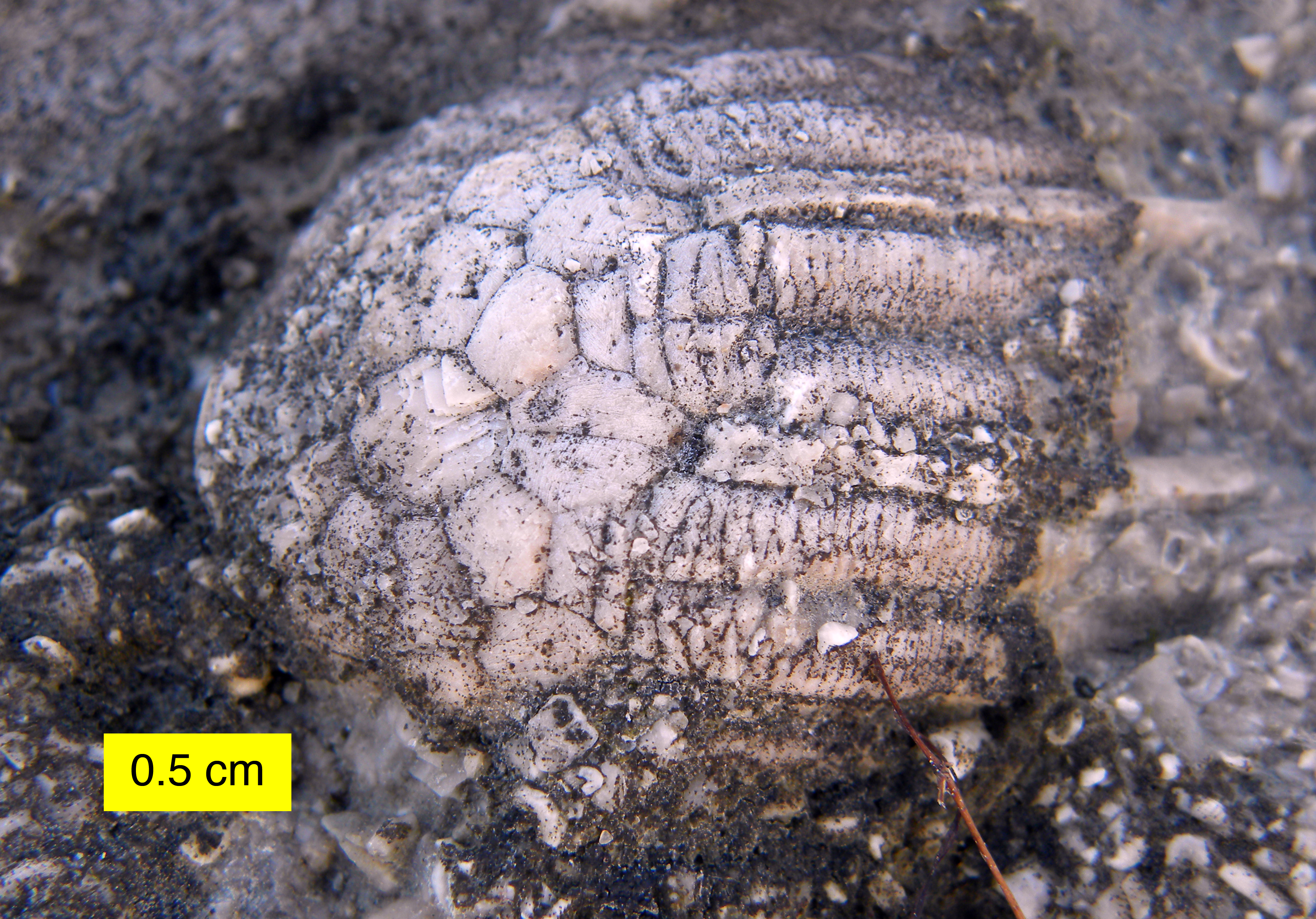
- Eucalyptocrinites calyx from the Kaugatuma Formation (Upper Silurian, Pridoli), Saaremaa, Estonia.

Scientific classification
- Kingdom: Animalia
- Phylum: Echinodermata
- Class: Crinoidea
- Order: †Monobathrida
- Family: †Eucalyptocrinitidae
- Genus: †Eucalyptocrinites; Goldfuss, 1831

= Eucalyptocrinites =

Eucalyptocrinites Temporal range: Silurian–Middle Devonian

Extinct genus of crinoids

Eucalyptocrinites is an extinct genus of crinoid that lived from the Silurian to the Middle Devonian. Its remains have been found in Asia, Australia, Europe, and North America.
