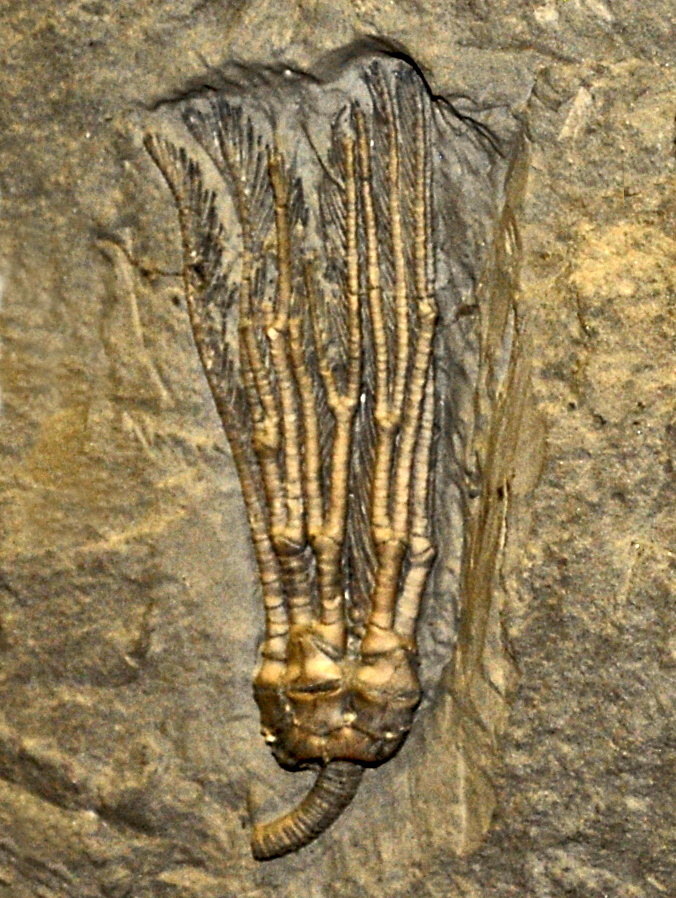
- Fossil of Abrotocrinus from Carboniferous of United States

Scientific classification
- Kingdom: Animalia
- Phylum: Echinodermata
- Class: Crinoidea
- Parvclass: Cladida
- Genus: †Abrotocrinus; Miller and Gurley, 1890

= Abrotocrinus =

Abrotocrinus Temporal range: Early Carboniferous, 353.8–345.0 Ma

Extinct genus of crinoids

Abrotocrinus is an extinct genus of crinoids.

== Fossil record ==
This genus is known in the fossil record of the Carboniferous period of United States and Canada (age range: 353.8 to 345.0 million years ago).

== See also ==
- List of crinoid genera
