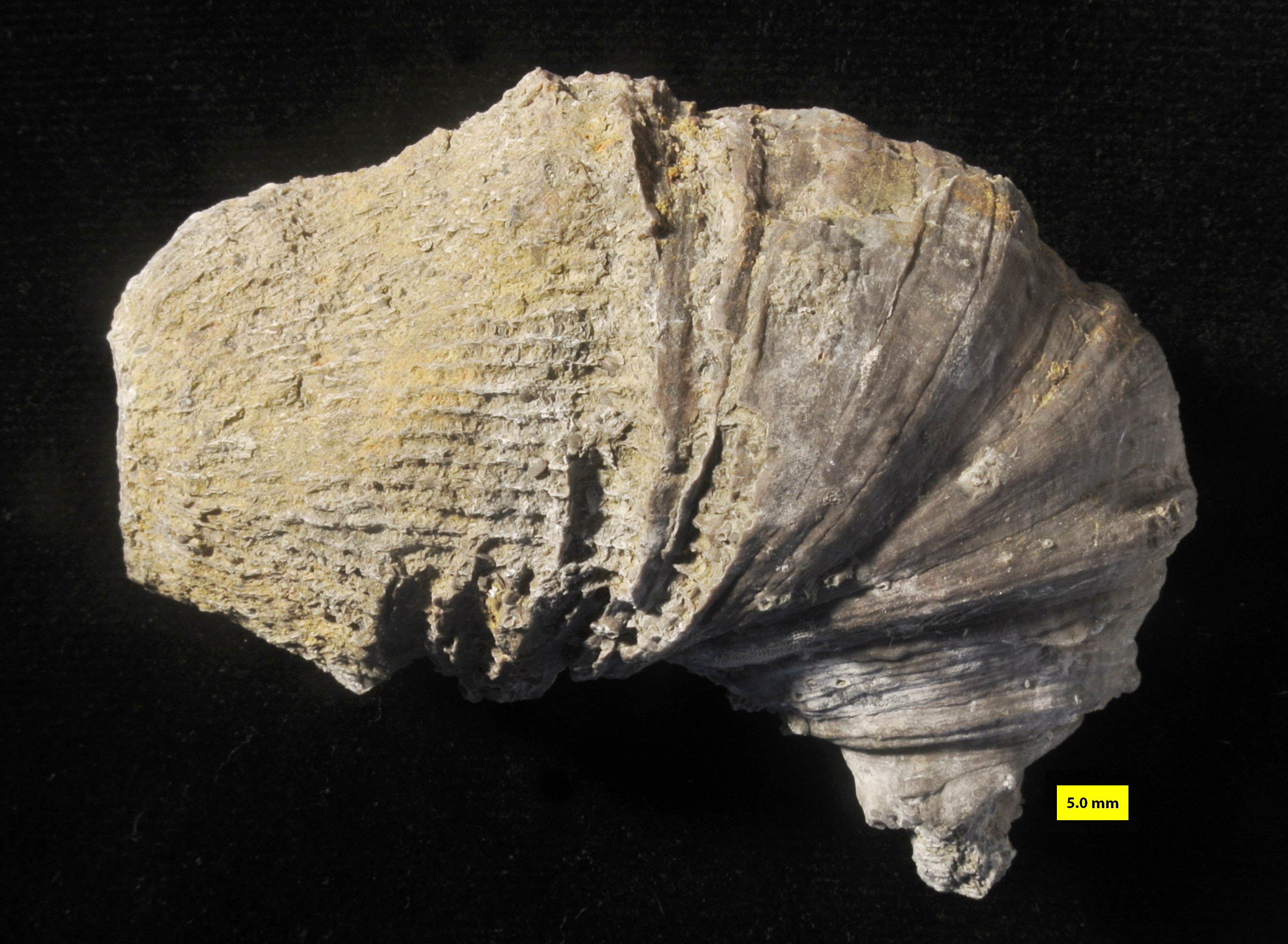
- H. halli; Centerfield Limestone Member (Middle Devonian), Bethany Center, New York

Scientific classification
- Domain: Eukaryota
- Kingdom: Animalia
- Phylum: Cnidaria
- Subphylum: Anthozoa
- Class: †Rugosa
- Family: †Zaphrentidae
- Genus: †Heliophyllum; Hall 1846

Species
- H. canadense; H. damesianum; H. dianthus; H. halli; H. truncatum

= Heliophyllum =

Heliophyllum Temporal range: Mid Devonian ~392–376 Ma

Extinct genus of corals

Heliophyllum is an extinct genus of corals that existed predominantly in the Devonian. Heliophyllum is of the order Rugosa and can be referred to as horn corals. They were mostly solitary animals, although some were colonial. The genus had a wide distribution. Fossils of H. halli have been found in the fossil rich Floresta Formation of the Altiplano Cundiboyacense, Colombia. This genus used its nematocysts to stun prey.
