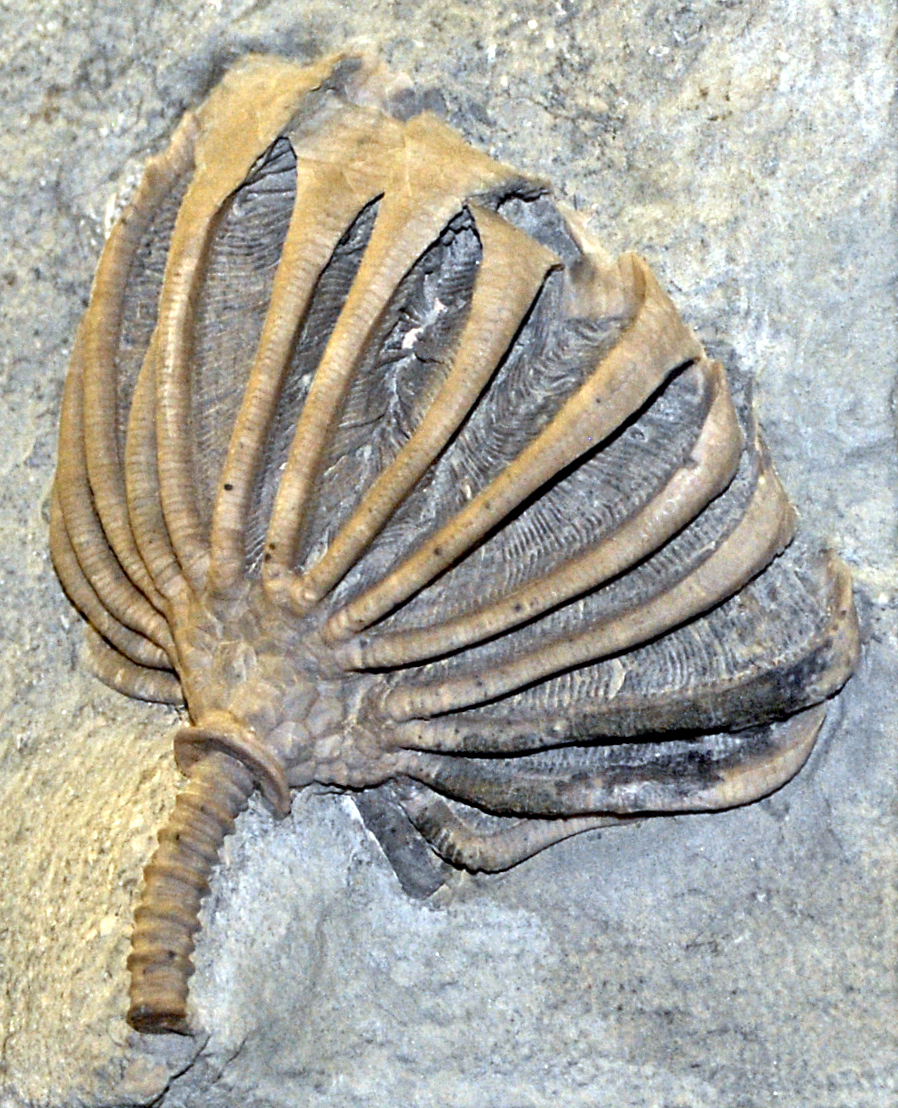
- Fossil Eretmocrinus from Carboniferous of Indiana (U.S.A.)

Scientific classification
- Kingdom: Animalia
- Phylum: Echinodermata
- Class: Crinoidea
- Order: †Monobathrida
- Family: †Batocrinidae
- Genus: †Eretmocrinus; Lyon and Casseday, 1859

= Eretmocrinus =

Eretmocrinus Temporal range: Carboniferous

Extinct genus of crinoids

Eretmocrinus is an extinct genus of crinoids.

== Fossil records ==
This genus is known in the fossil record of the Carboniferous period (age range: 353.8 to 311.45 million years ago). Fossils of species within this genus have been found in Canada and United States.
