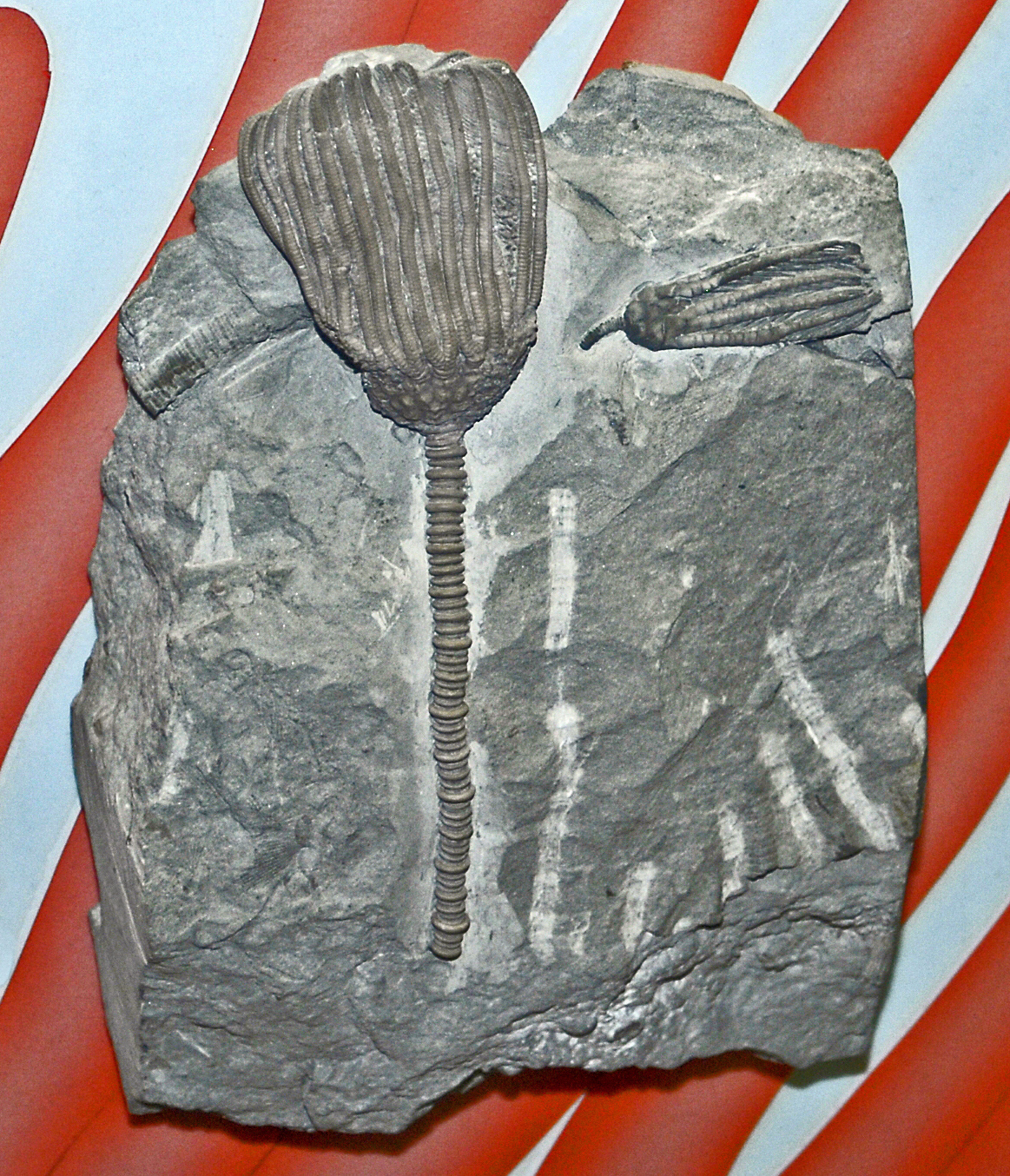
- Fossil of Dizygocrinus from Carboniferous of Indiana (U.S.A.)

Scientific classification
- Kingdom: Animalia
- Phylum: Echinodermata
- Class: Crinoidea
- Order: †Monobathrida
- Family: †Batocrinidae
- Genus: †Dizygocrinus; Wachsmuth and Springer, 1897

= Dizygocrinus =

Dizygocrinus Temporal range: Carboniferous

Extinct genus of crinoids

Dizygocrinus is a genus of extinct sea lily from the family Batocrinidae.

These stationary upper-level epifaunal suspension feeders lived in the Carboniferous period of United States, from 345.0 to 342.8 Ma.

== Species ==
- Dizygocrinus biturbinatus (Hall)
- Dizygocrinus indianaensis (Lyon and Casseday)
- Dizygocrinus caroli (Hall)
- Dizygocrinus whitei (Wachsmuth and Springer)
- Dizygocrinus originarius (Wachsmuth and Springer)
- Dizygocrinus montgomeryensis (Worthen)
- Dizygocrinus gorbyi (Miller)
- Dizygocrinus venustus (Miller)
- Dizygocrinus peculiaris (Miller and Gurley)
- Dizygocrinus mutabilis (Wachsmuth and Springer)
- Dizygocrinus cantonensis (Wachsmuth and Springer)
