= List of the prehistoric life of Iowa =

This list of the prehistoric life of Iowa contains the various prehistoric life-forms whose fossilized remains have been reported from within the US state of Iowa.

== Precambrian ==
The Paleobiology Database records no known occurrences of Precambrian fossils in Alabama.

== Paleozoic ==
=== Selected Paleozoic taxa of Iowa ===
- †Acidaspis
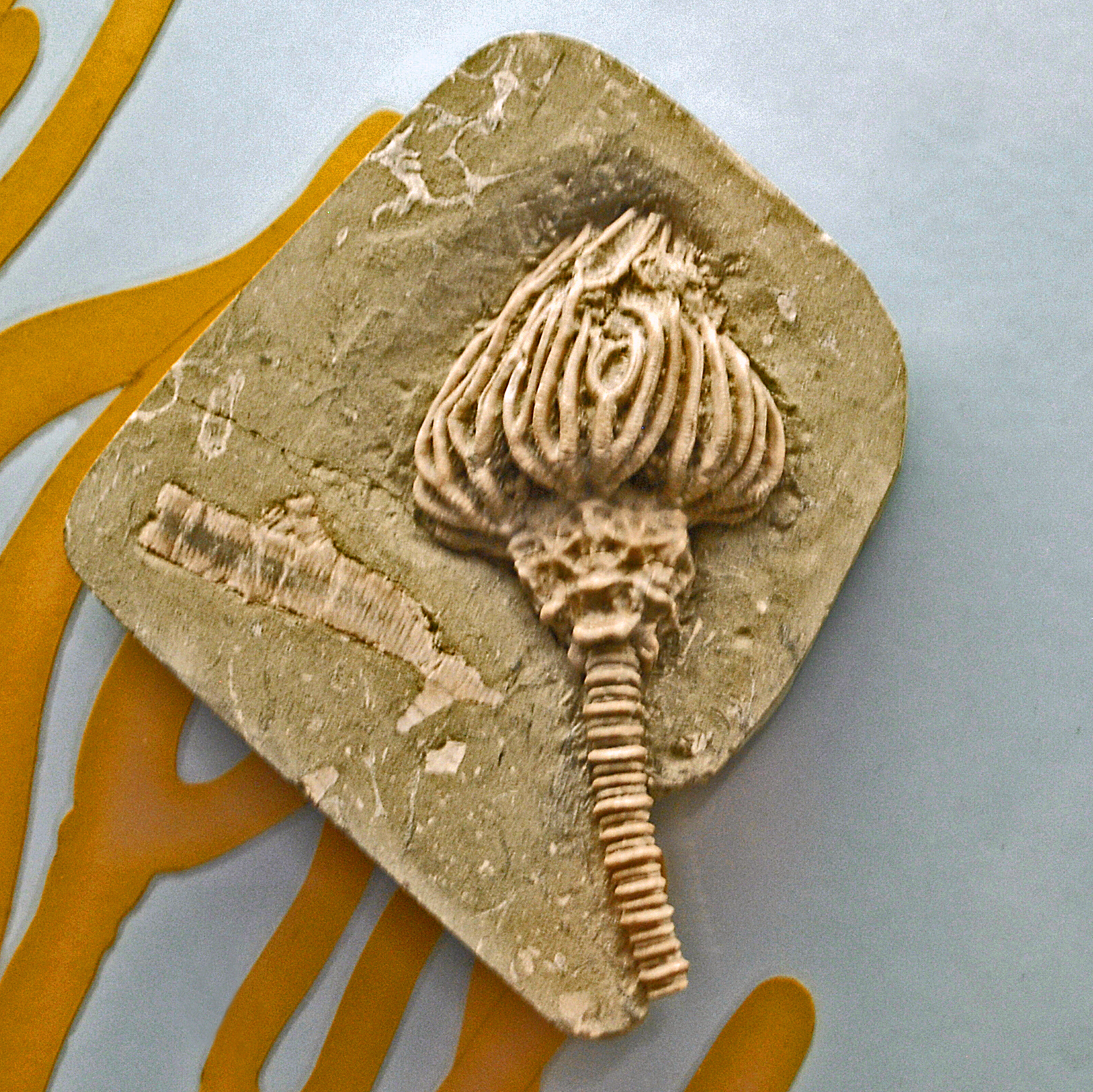
- Fossilized calyx and partial stem of the Devonian-Permian crinoid ("sea lily") Actinocrinites
  †Actinocrinites
  - †Actinocrinites gibsoni
  - †Actinocrinites lowei
- †Agassizodus
  - †Agassizodus variabilis
- †Aglaocrinus
- †Amplexus
- †Anataphrus
- †Anomphalus
- †Archaeogastropod
- †Arctinurus
- †Athyris
  - †Athyris fultonensis – or unidentified comparable form
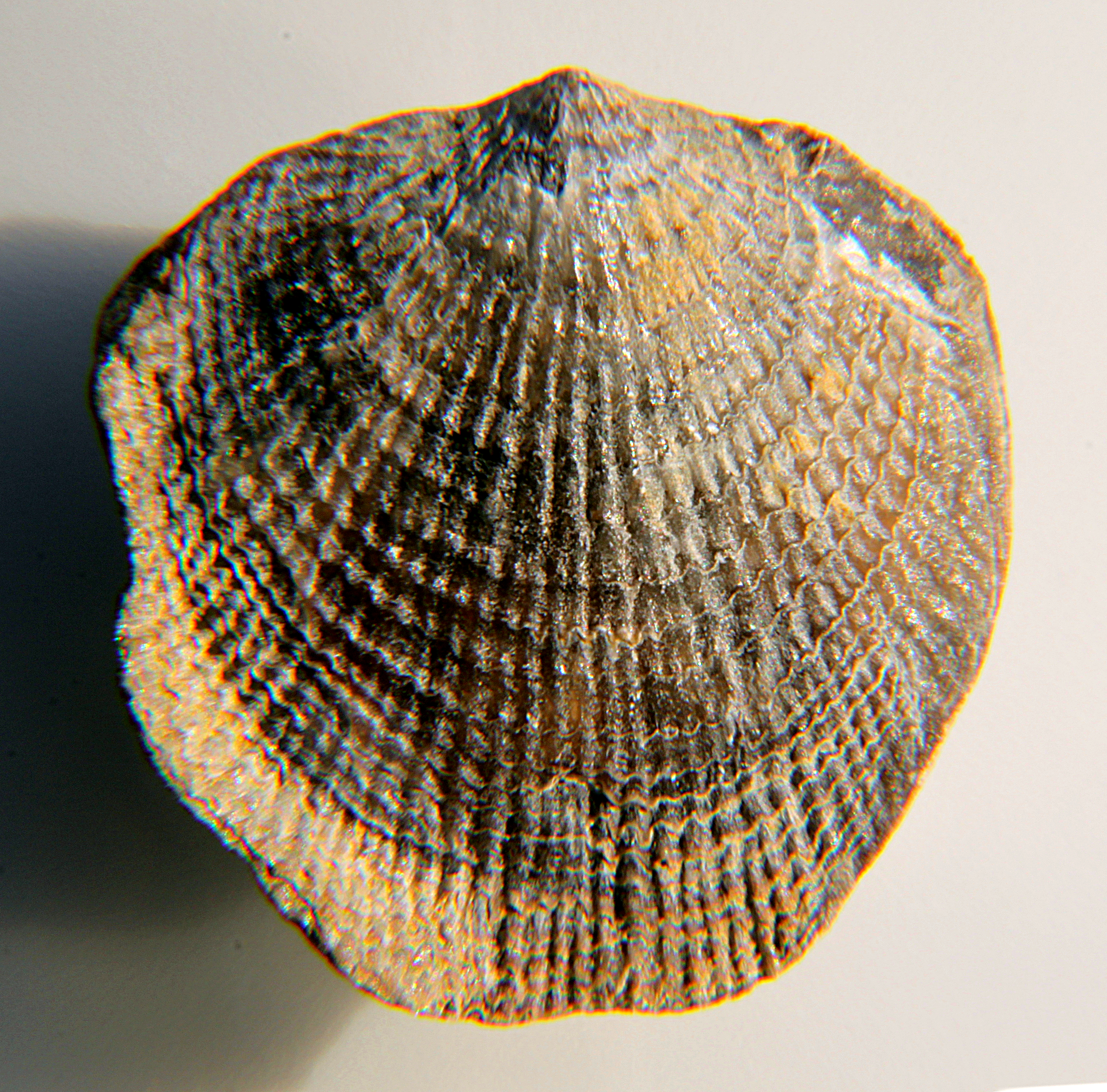
- Fossilized shell of the Silurian-Late Devonian brachiopod Atrypa reticularis
  †Atrypa
  - †Atrypa reticularis
  - †Atrypa reticularus
- †Aviculopecten
- †Bellerophon
- †Bembexia
- †Bothriocidaris
- †Bumastus
- †Calymene
- †Camarotoechia
  - †Camarotoechia chouteauensis
  - †Camarotoechia tuta
- †Cardiola
- †Catenipora
- †Ceratocephala
- †Ceratopsis
- †Ceraurus
- †Charactoceras
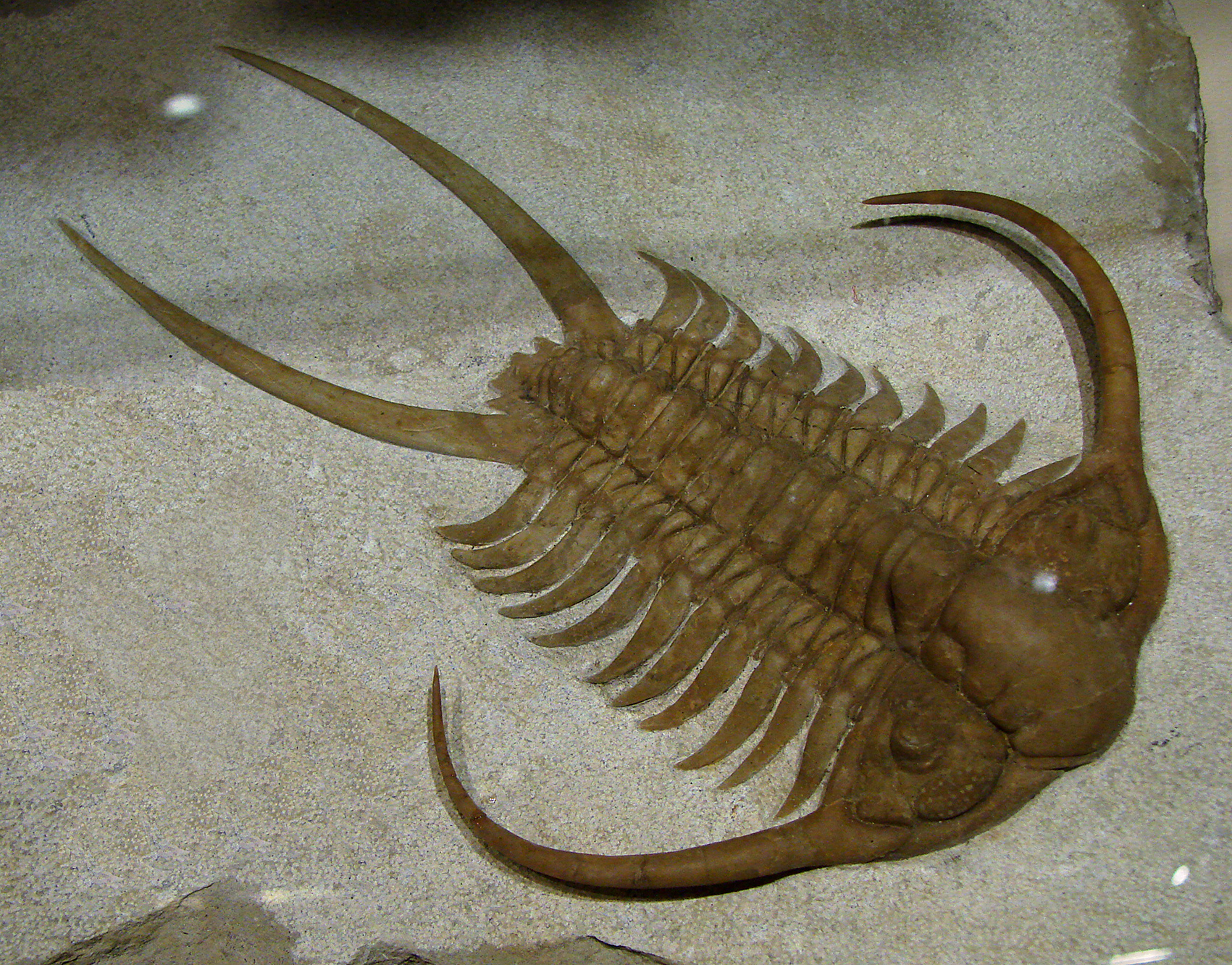
- Fossil of the Cambrian-Middle Devonian trilobite Cheirurus
  †Cheirurus
- †Chomatodus
  - †Chomatodus inconstans
- †Chonetes
  - †Chonetes glenparkensis
  - †Chonetes illinoisensis
  - †Chonetes logani
  - †Chonetes multicosta
  - †Chonetes ornatus
- †Cleiothyridina
  - †Cleiothyridina incrassata – or unidentified comparable form
  - †Cleiothyridina sublamellosa
- †Climacograptus
- †Coenites
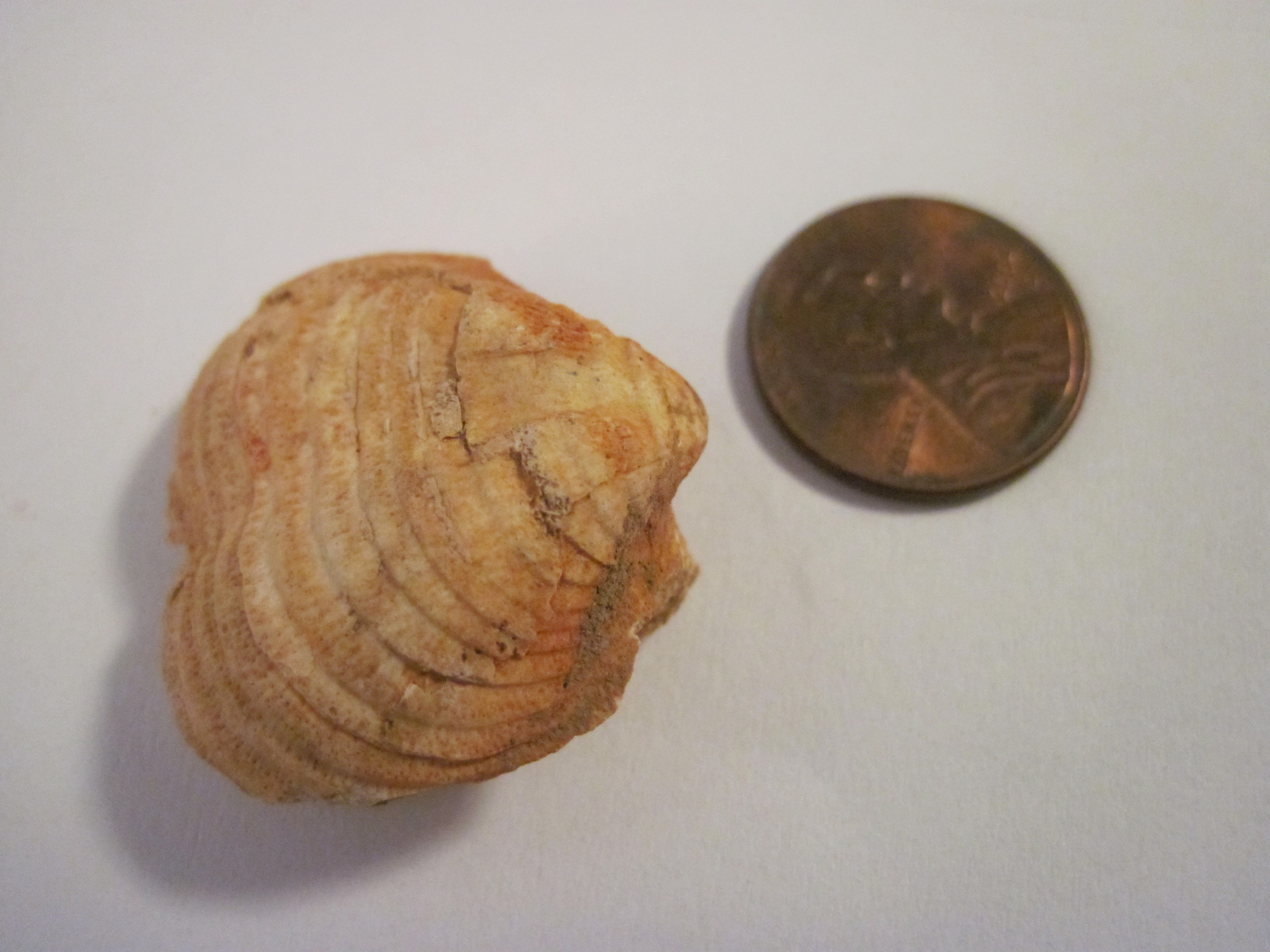
- Fossilized shell of the Late Devonian-Permian brachiopod Composita
  †Composita
  - †Composita humilis – tentative report
  - †Composita trinuclea
- †Conocardium
- †Coolinia
- †Cornulites
- †Crania
- †Crotalocrinites
- †Curtognathus
- †Cyathocrinites
- †Cyclonema
- †Cyphaspis
- †Cypricardinia
- †Cyrtolites
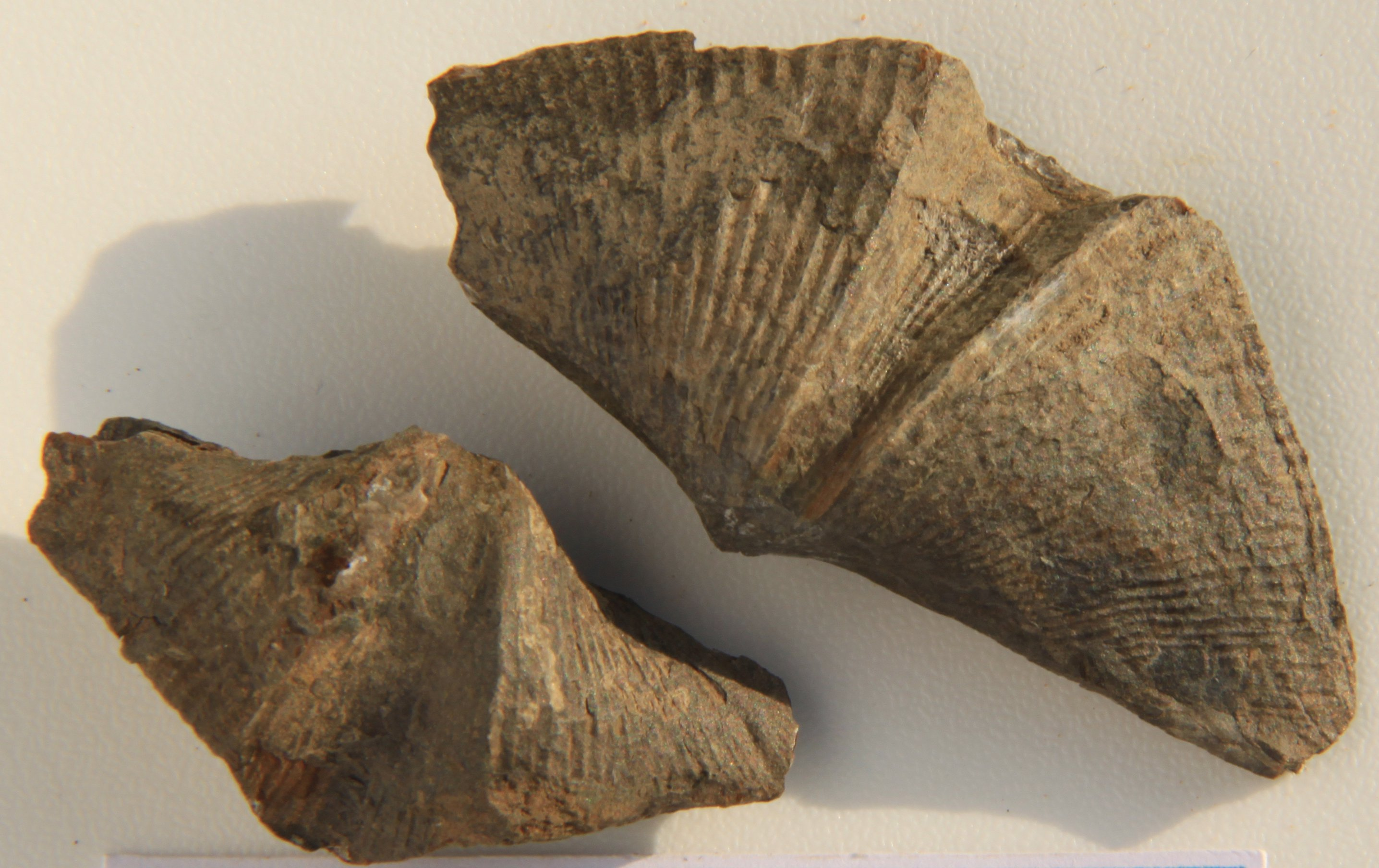
- Fossilized shells of the Middle-Late Devonian brachiopod Cyrtospirifer
  †Cyrtospirifer
  - †Cyrtospirifer whitneyi
- †Cystodictya
- †Dalmanites
- †Decadocrinus
- †Deiphon
- †Deltaherpeton – type locality for genus
- †Dentalium
- †Dicoelosia
- †Dimerocrinites
- †Diplograptus
  - †Diplograptus modestus – or unidentified comparable form
- †Discosorus
- †Earlandia
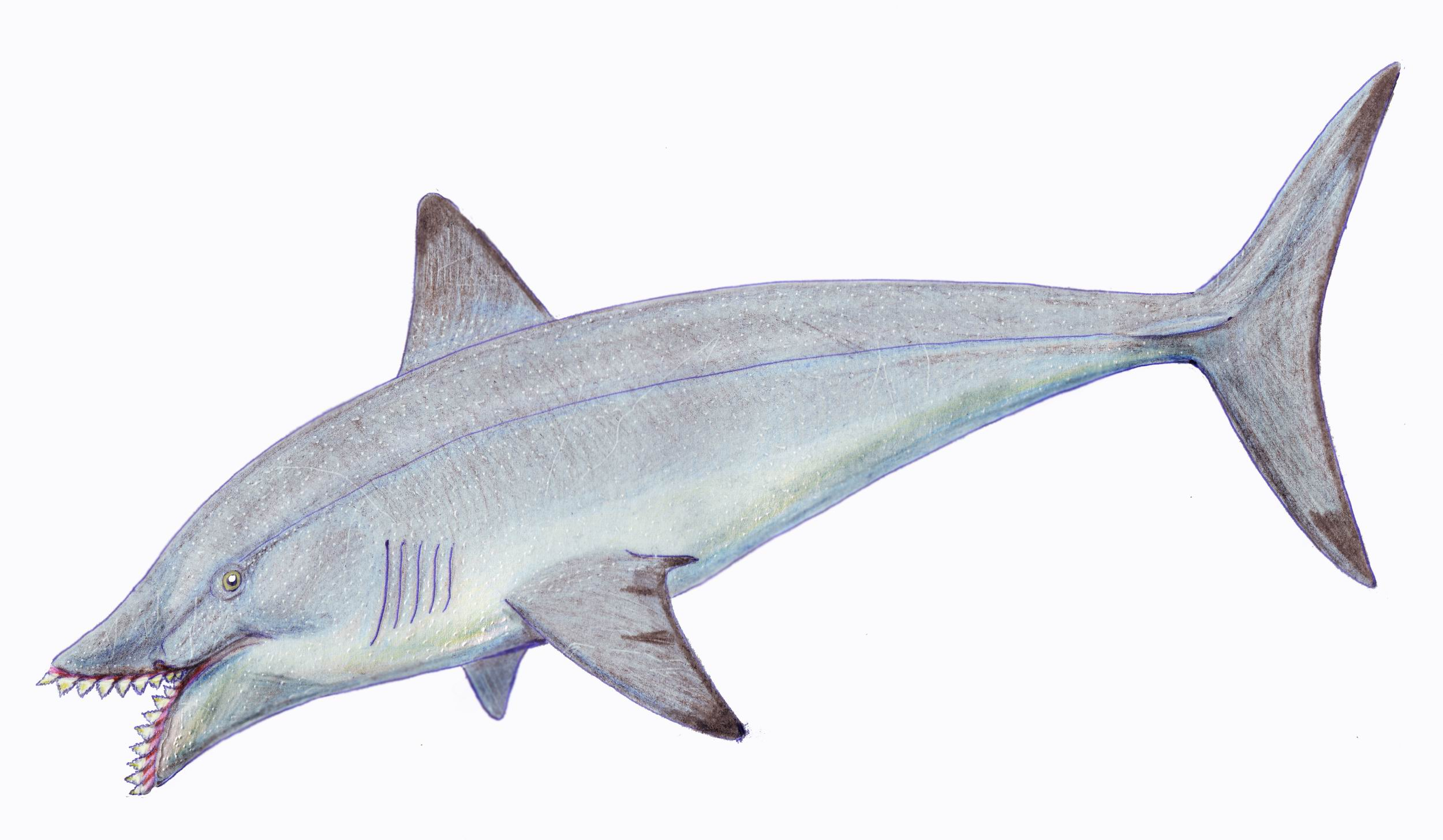
- Life restoration of the Late Devonian-Carboniferous Chimaera relative Edestus
  †Edestus
- †Edmondia
- †Eldredgeops
  - †Eldredgeops rana
- †Ellesmeroceras
- †Encrinurus
- †Endoceras
- Eocaudina
- †Eodictyonella
- †Eophacops
- †Eospirifer
  - †Eospirifer radiatus
- †Eucalyptocrinites
- †Euomphalus
- †Favosites
- †Fenestella
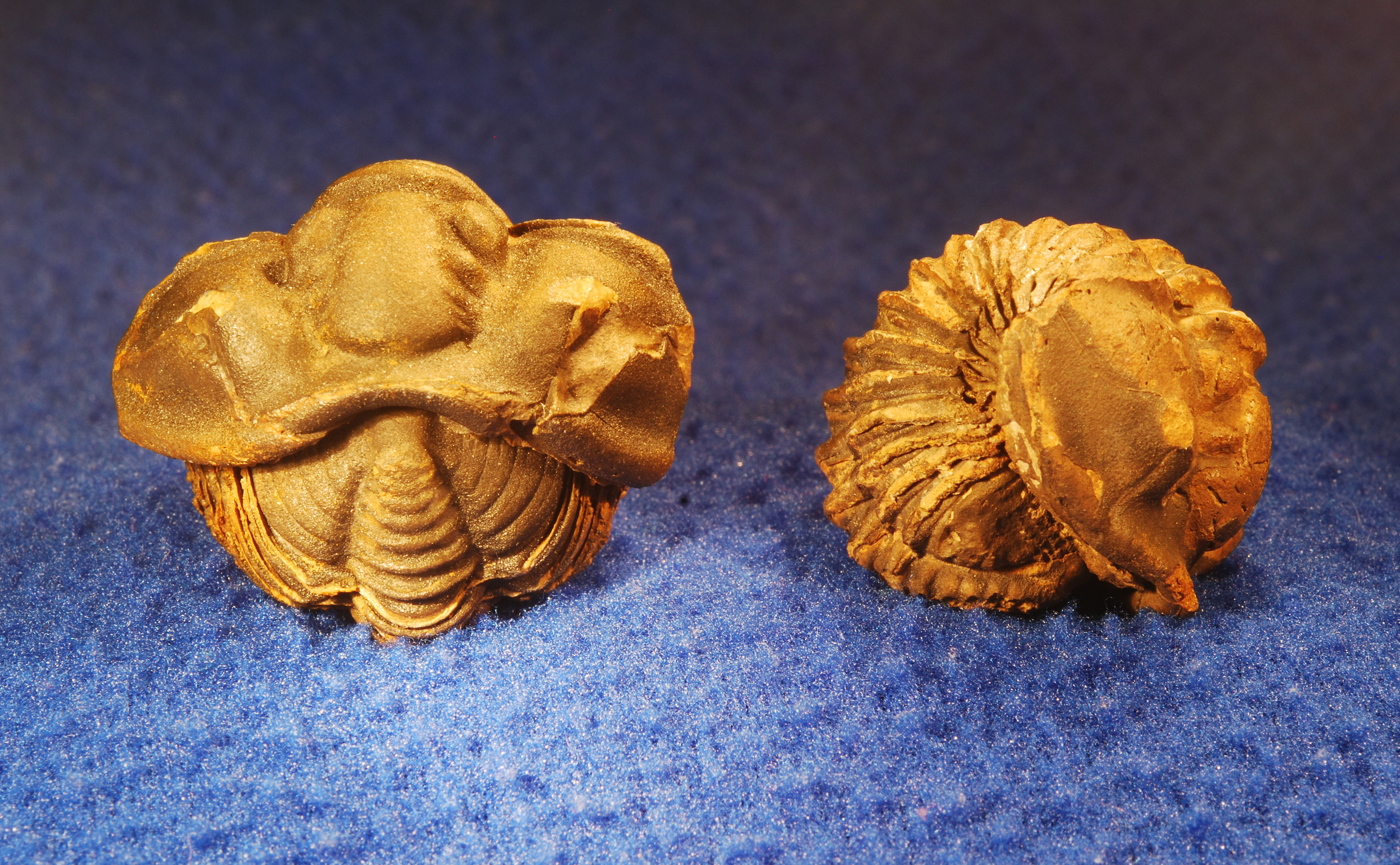
- Front (left) and right side (right) views of an enrolled fossil of the Middle Ordovician-Silurian trilobite Flexicalymene
  †Flexicalymene
- †Goniatites
- †Gravicalymene
- †Greenops
- †Grewingkia
- †Gyroceras
- †Hallopora
- †Halysites
- †Harpidium
- †Heliophyllum
- †Hexagonaria
- †Hindia
- †Holopea
- †Huronia
- †Hyolithes
- †Icriodus
- †Idiognathodus
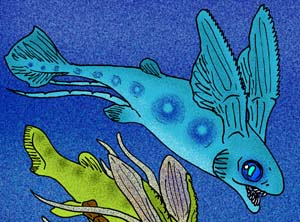
- Life restoration of the Carboniferous Chimaera relative Iniopteryx
  †Iniopteryx
  - †Iniopteryx rushlaui
- †Iocrinus
- †Isotelus
- †Kayoceras
- †Kionoceras
- †Krausella
- †Leptopora
- †Lingula
- †Manticoceras
- †Marsupiocrinus
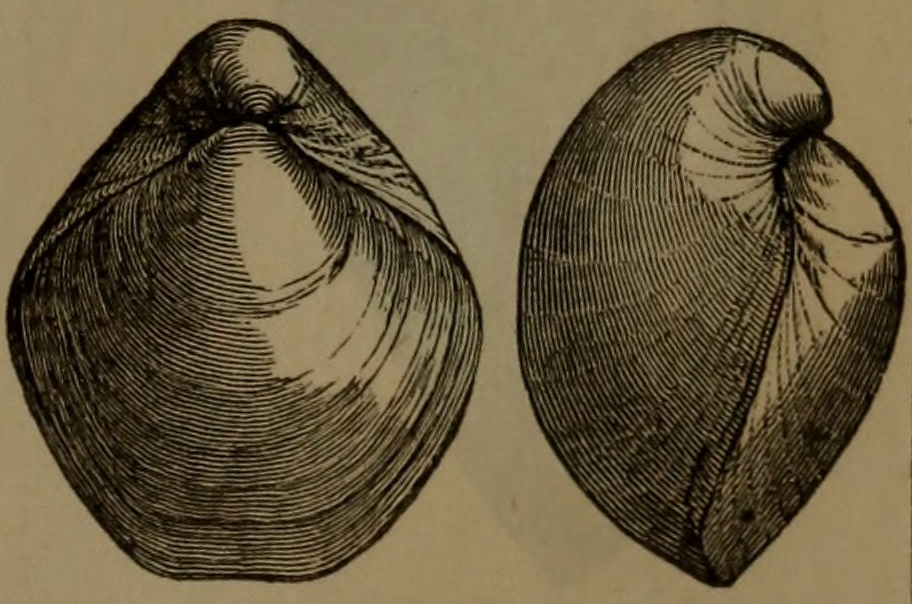
- Illustration (lower right, entry 15) of a fossilized shell in front and side views of the Silurian-Late Devonian brachiopod Meristella
  †Meristella
- †Meristina
- †Michelia
- †Michelinoceras
- †Murchisonia
- †Mycterops
- †Mystrocephala
- †Naticopsis
  - †Naticopsis depressa – type locality for species
- †Neospirifer
- Nucula
- †Odontopleura
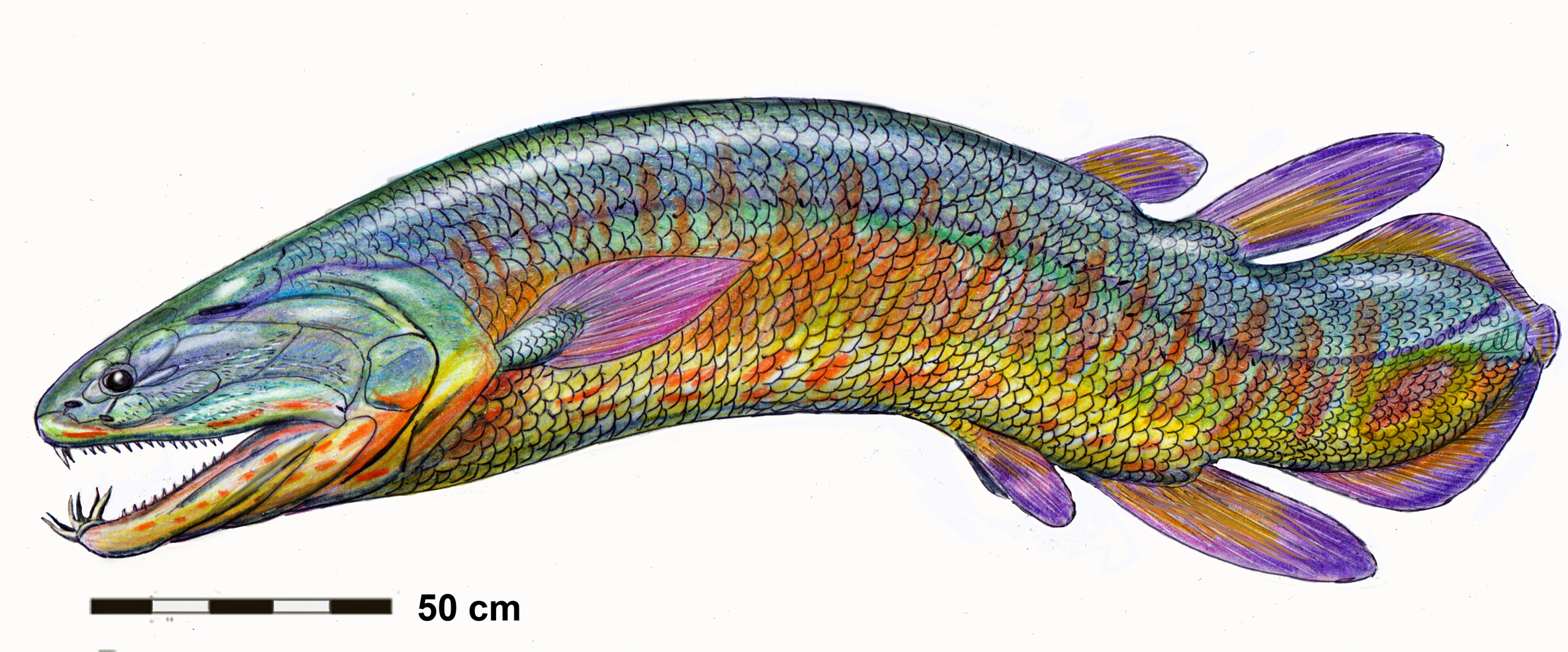
- Life restoration of the Middle-Late Devonian lobe-finned fish Onychodus
  †Onychodus
- †Orthoceras
- †Oulodus
- †Ozarkodina
- †Pachyphyllum
- †Paladin
- †Palmatolepis
- †Peachocaris
- †Pentamerus
- †Pentremites
- †Periechocrinus
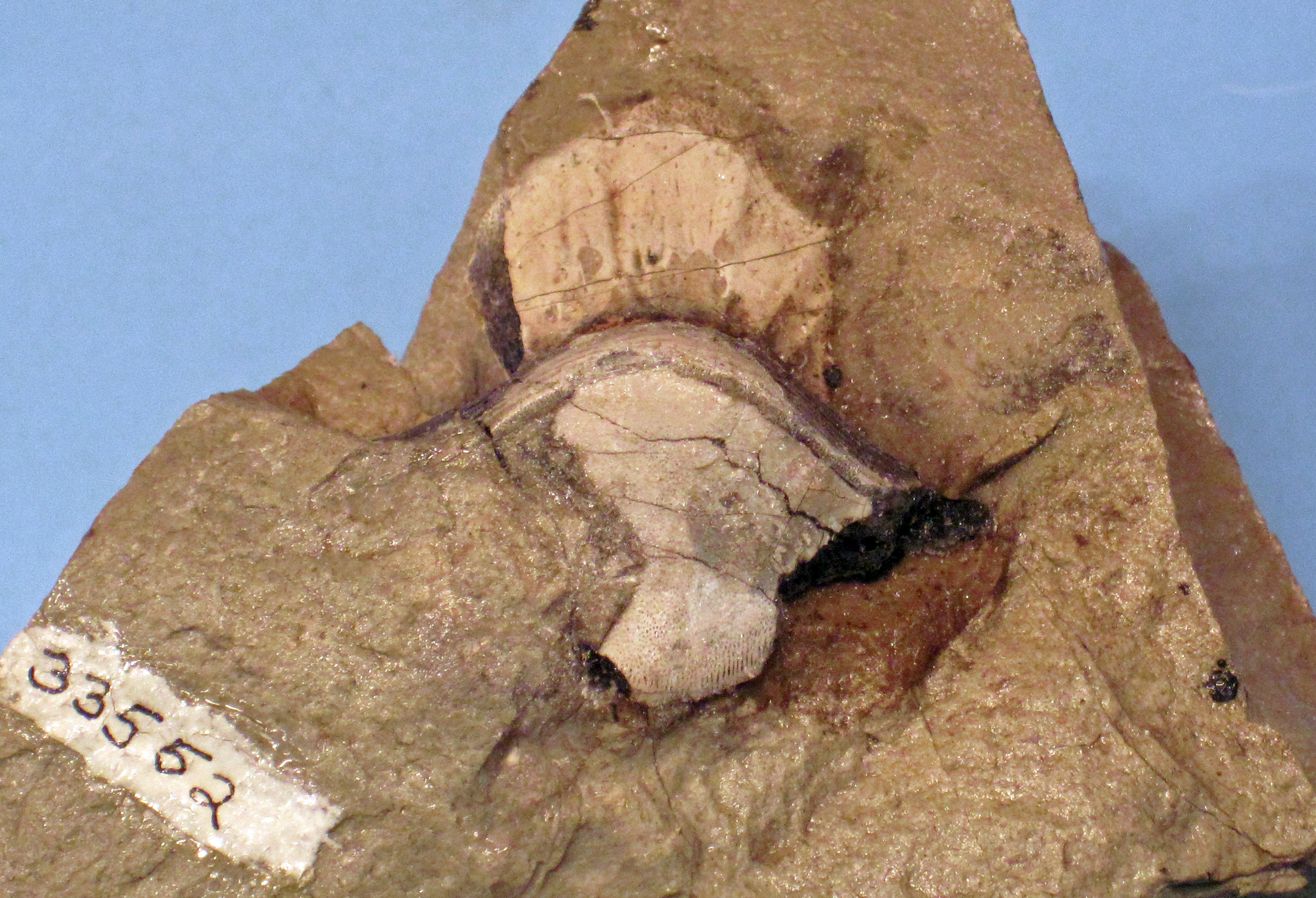
- Fossilized tooth of the Carboniferous-Permian shark Petalodus
  †Petalodus
- †Phacops
- †Phillipsia
- †Pinnocaris
- †Plaesiomys
- †Platyceras
- †Platycrinites
- †Platystrophia
- †Plectodonta
- †Pleurocystites
- Pleurotomaria – tentative report
- †Plicochonetes
- †Poleumita
- †Polygnathus
  - †Polygnathus parawebbi
  - †Polygnathus xylus
- †Posidonia
- †Proetus
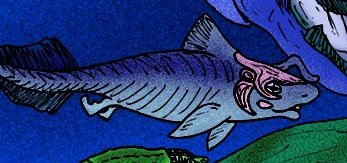
- Life restoration of the Late Devonian placoderm fish Ptyctodus
  †Ptyctodus
- †Rhynchodus
- †Rigidella
- †Scutellum
- †Scytalocrinus
- †Septemchiton
- †Sigournea – type locality for genus
  - †Sigournea multidentata – type locality for species
- †Similodonta
- †Skenidioides – tentative report
- †Sowerbyella
- †Sphenothallus
- †Spirifer
  - †Spirifer louisianensis
- †Spiriferina
- Spirorbis
- †Spyroceras
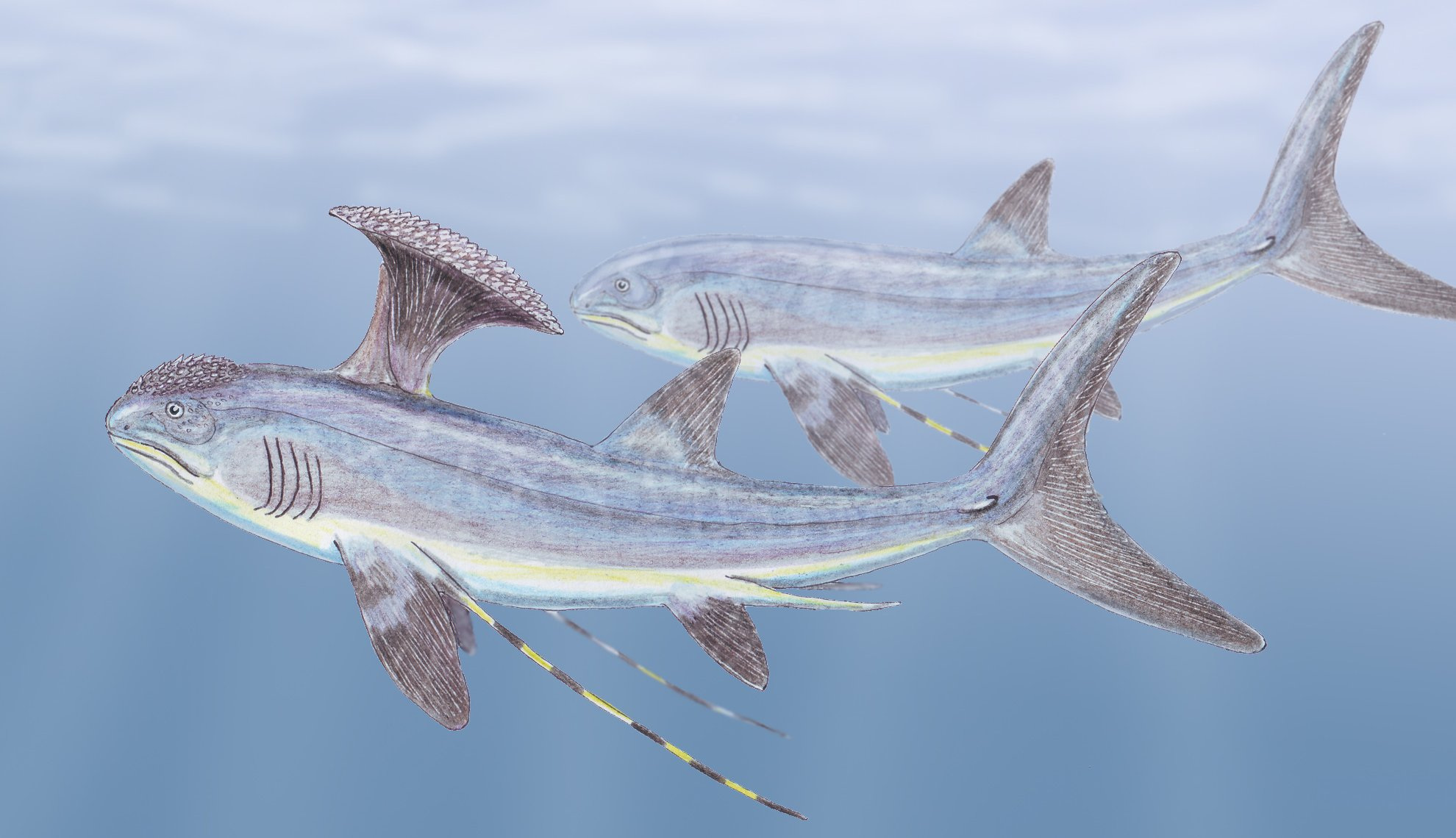
- Life restorations of a male (foreground) and female (background) of the Late Devonian-Carboniferous Chimaera relative Stethacanthus
  †Stethacanthus
- †Streptognathodus
- †Strophomena
  - †Strophomena costata
  - †Strophomena erratica
- †Stylonema – tentative report
- †Syringopora
- †Taxocrinus
- †Tranodis
- †Whatcheeria – type locality for genus
- †Worthenia
- †Youngia

== Mesozoic ==
- †Arcellites
  - †Arcellites crillensis – type locality for species
  - †Arcellites disciformis
- †Balmeisporites
  - †Balmeisporites auriculata – type locality for species
- †Chrysotheca
  - †Chrysotheca dakotaensis – type locality for species
  - †Chrysotheca diskoensis
  - †Chrysotheca levis
- Coptothyris
  - †Coptothyris dakotaensis – type locality for species
- †Dunveganoceras
  - †Dunveganoceras pondi
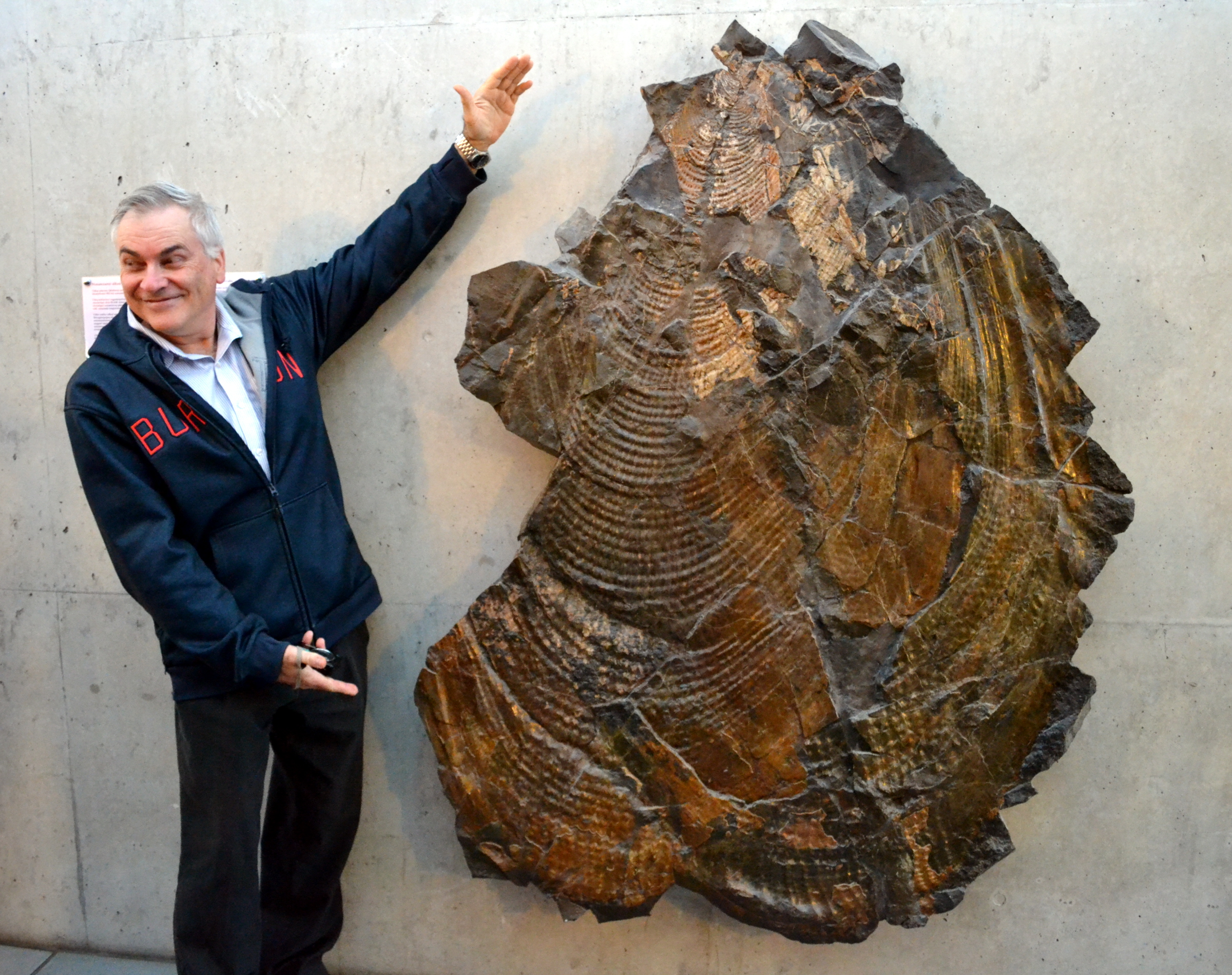
- Fossilized shell of the Early Jurassic-Late Cretaceous marine bivalve Inoceramus with a human indicating its size
  †Inoceramus
  - †Inoceramus ginterensis
  - †Inoceramus perfragilis
  - †Inoceramus prefragilis
- †Metengonoceras
  - †Metengonoceras acutum
- †Microcarpolithes
  - †Microcarpolithes hexangulata
- †Minerisporites
  - †Minerisporites mirabilis
- †Molaspora – type locality for genus
  - †Molaspora lobata
  - †Molaspora rugosa – type locality for species
- †Perotrilites
  - †Perotrilites bursatus – type locality for species
  - †Perotrilites convolutus – type locality for species
- †Pilularia
  - †Pilularia globulifera
- †Regnellidium
  - †Regnellidium diphyllum
- †Spermatites
  - †Spermatites ellipticus
  - †Spermatites elongatus

== Cenozoic ==
- Blarina
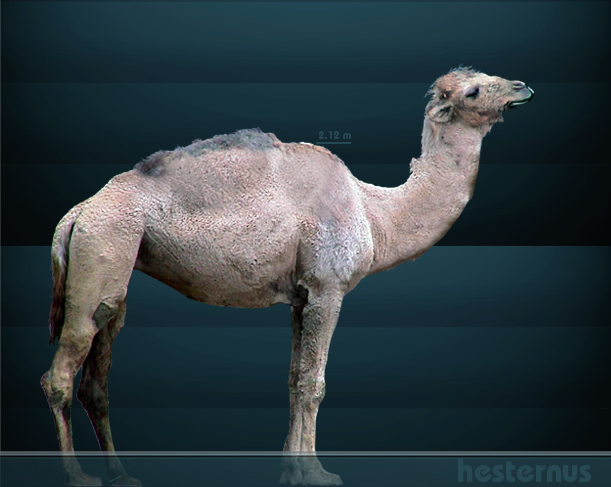
- Life restoration of the Pliocene-Holocene camel Camelops
  †Camelops
- Canis
  - †Canis latrans
  - †Canis lupus
- Castor
  - †Castor canadensis
- †Castoroides
  - †Castoroides ohioensis
- Didelphis
- Equus
- †Euceratherium – tentative report
  - †Euceratherium collinum
- Geomys
- Lepus
- Lontra
  - †Lontra canadensis
- †Mammut
  - †Mammut americanum
- †Mammuthus
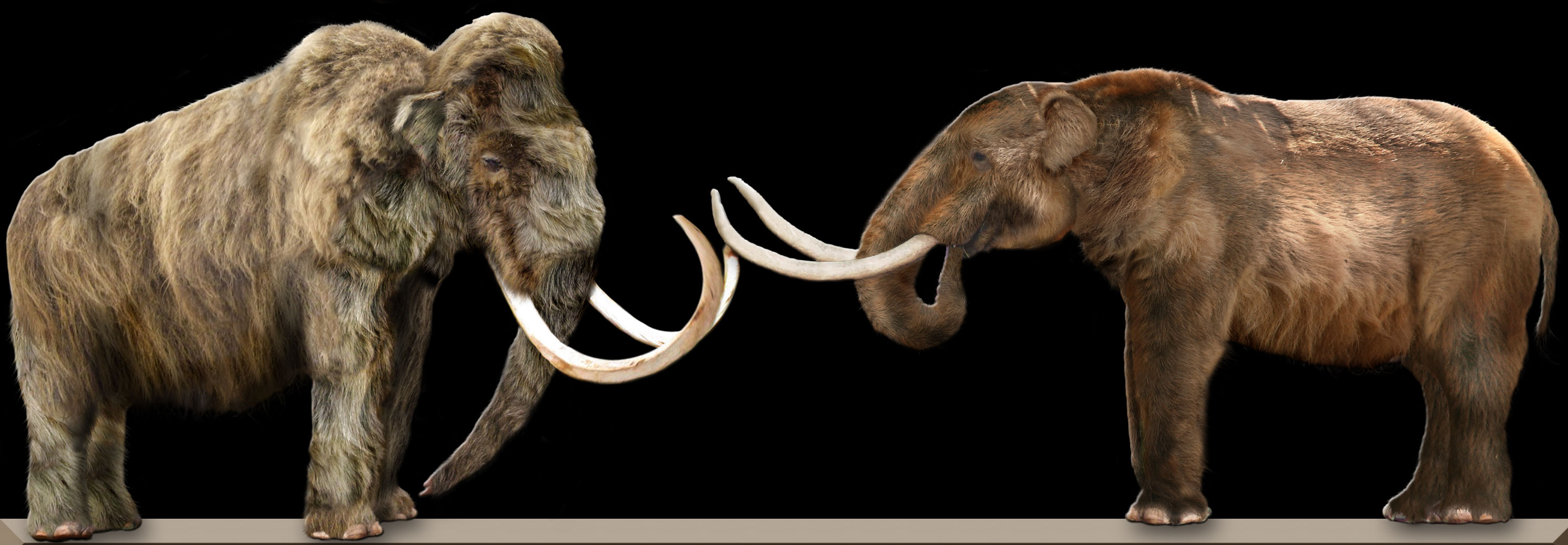
  - Life restorations of a Mammut americanum, or American mastodon (right), and a Mammuthus primigenius, or wooly mammoth (left)
    †Mammuthus primigenius
- †Megalonyx
  - †Megalonyx jeffersonii
- Microtus
  - †Microtus paroperarius
- Mictomys
  - †Mictomys meltoni
- Odocoileus
- Ondatra
- Panthera
- †Paramylodon
  - †Paramylodon harlani
- †Platygonus
- Procyon
- Rangifer
- Sciurus
- †Smilodon
- Sorex
  - †Sorex dispar – or unidentified comparable form
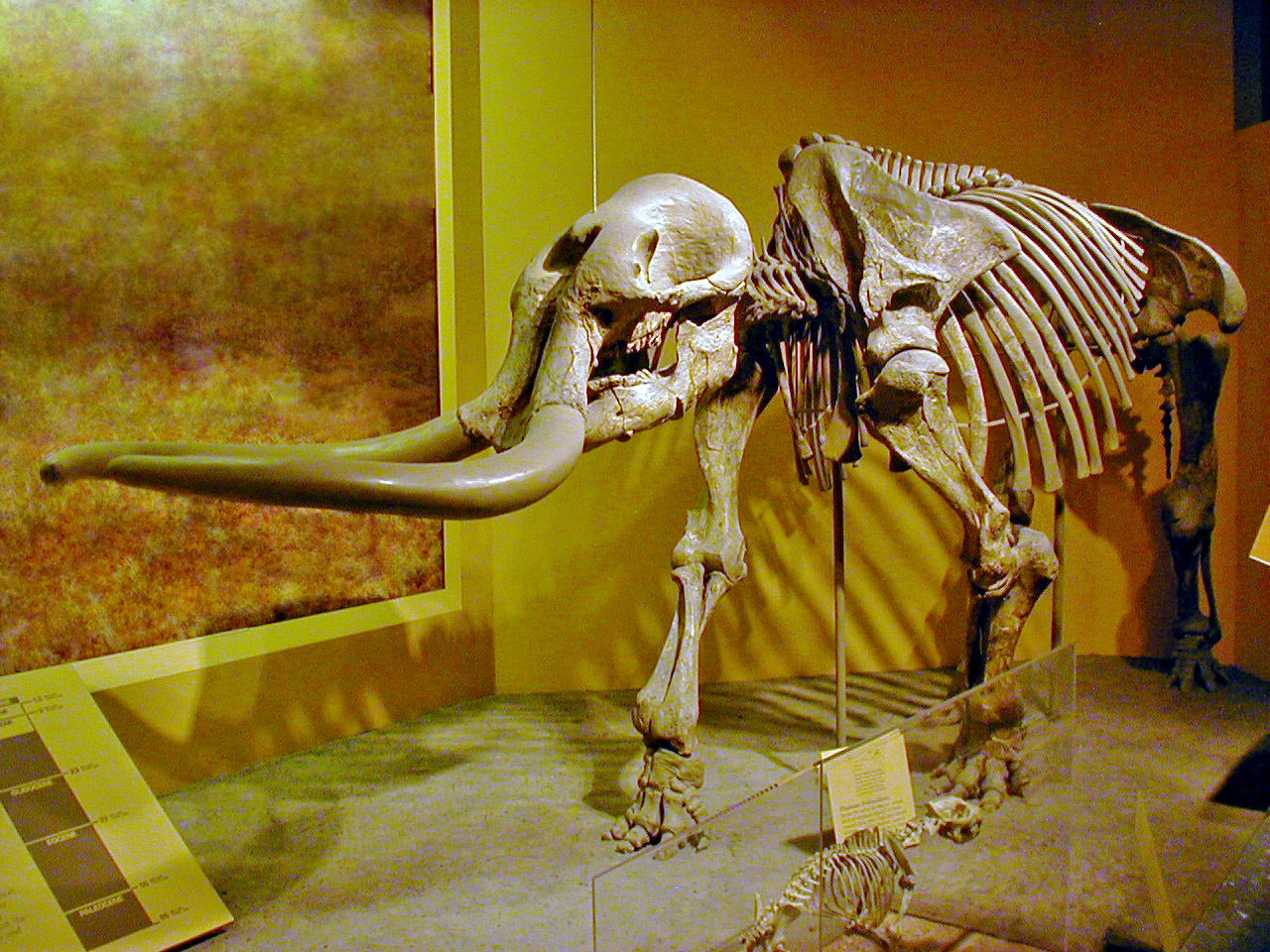
- Mounted fossilized skeleton of the Pliocene-Pleistocene elephant relative Stegomastodon
  †Stegomastodon
  - †Stegomastodon aftoniae – type locality for species
- Sylvilagus
- Taxidea
  - †Taxidea taxus
- Ursus
  - †Ursus americanus
- Vulpes
