= Actinoconchus =

Actinoconchus Temporal range: Carboniferous - Late Permian

Scientific classification
- Kingdom: Animalia
- Phylum: Brachiopoda
- Class: Rhynchonellata
- Order: †Athyridida
- Family: †Athyrididae
- Subfamily: †Athyridinae
- Genus: †Actinoconchus; McCoy, 1844

Extinct genus of brachiopods

Actinoconchus is an extinct genus of brachiopods that lived from the Carboniferous to the Late Permian in Africa, Asia, Europe, and North America.
