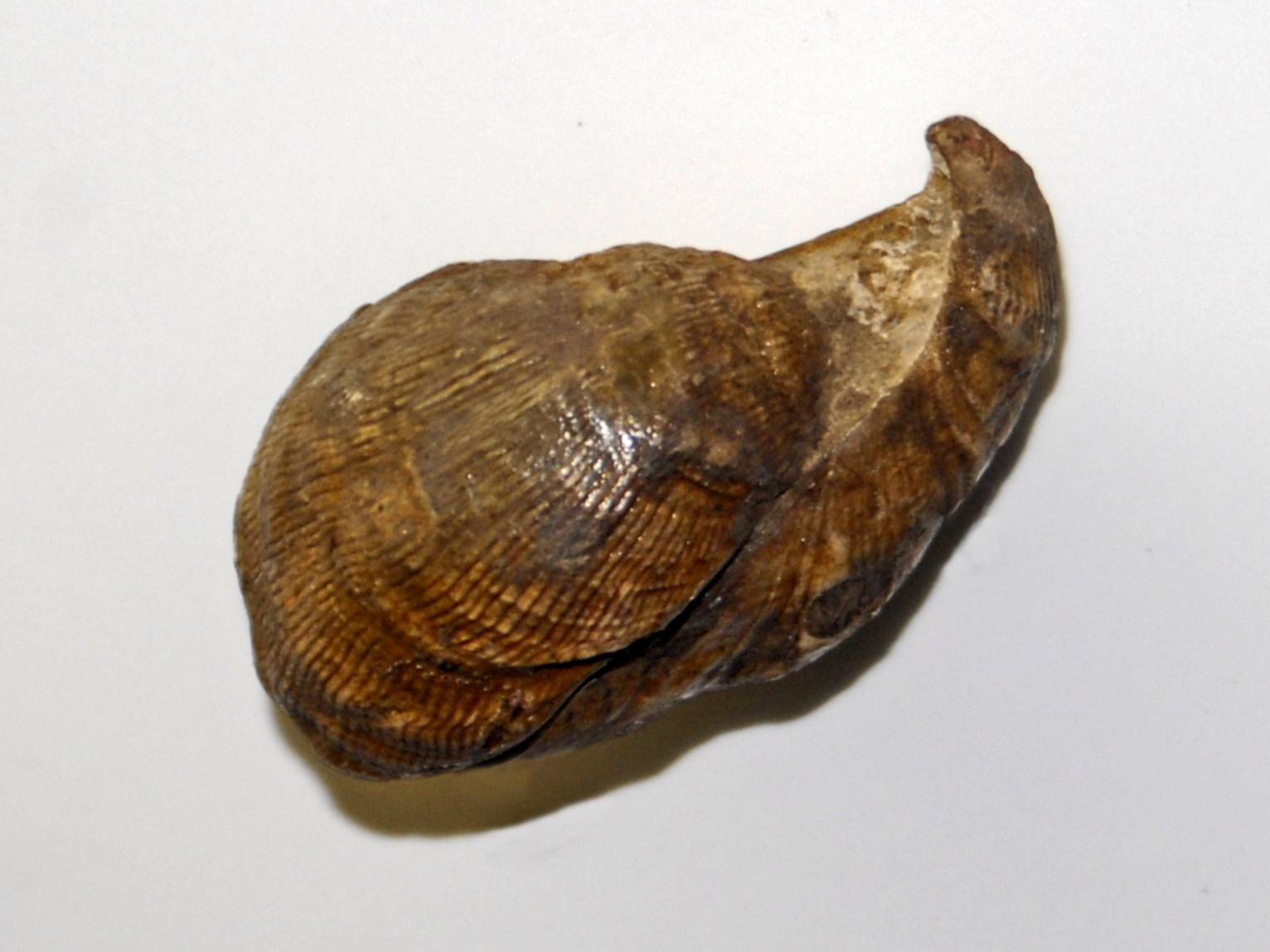
- Fossil specimen of Uncites gryphus from Devonian Germany

Scientific classification
- Kingdom: Animalia
- Phylum: Brachiopoda
- Class: Rhynchonellata
- Order: †Athyridida
- Superfamily: †Uncitoidea d'Orbigny, 1847
- Family: †Uncitidae d'Orbigny, 1847
- Genus: †Uncites; Defrance, 1825

= Uncites =

Uncites Temporal range: Middle Devonian

Extinct genus of brachiopods

Uncites is an extinct genus of brachiopods in the monogeneric family Uncitidae. Representatives of this genus are known from Middle Devonian deposits in Europe and Asia.
