= Spirigera concentrica =

Scientific classification
- Kingdom: Animalia
- Phylum: Brachiopoda
- Class: Rhynchonellata
- Order: †Athyridida
- Family: †Athyrididae
- Genus: †Spirigera
- Species: †S. concentrica

Binomial name
- †Spirigera concentrica von Buch, 1834

Extinct species of marine lamp shell

Spirigera concentrica is an extinct species of brachiopod.
