= Rhynchospira globosa =

Rhynchospira globosa Temporal range: Early Devonian

Scientific classification
- Kingdom: Animalia
- Phylum: Brachiopoda
- Class: Rhynchonellata
- Order: Athyridida
- Genus: †Rhynchospira
- Species: R. globosa

Binomial name
- Rhynchospira globosa

Paleozoic articulate brachiopod of the Athyridida

Rhynchospira globosa is a Paleozoic articulate brachiopod of the Athyridida. It was discovered in 1857 by James Hall.

Fossils of Rhynchospira globosa can be found in North America, particularly in locations such as the Keyser Limestone, Kenneth Limestone (Indiana), New York (particularly New Scotland, Coeymans, and Becraft), and Quebec. In the Keyser Limestone, Rhynchospira globosa is commonly found within the Camarotoechia? lamellata subzone.
