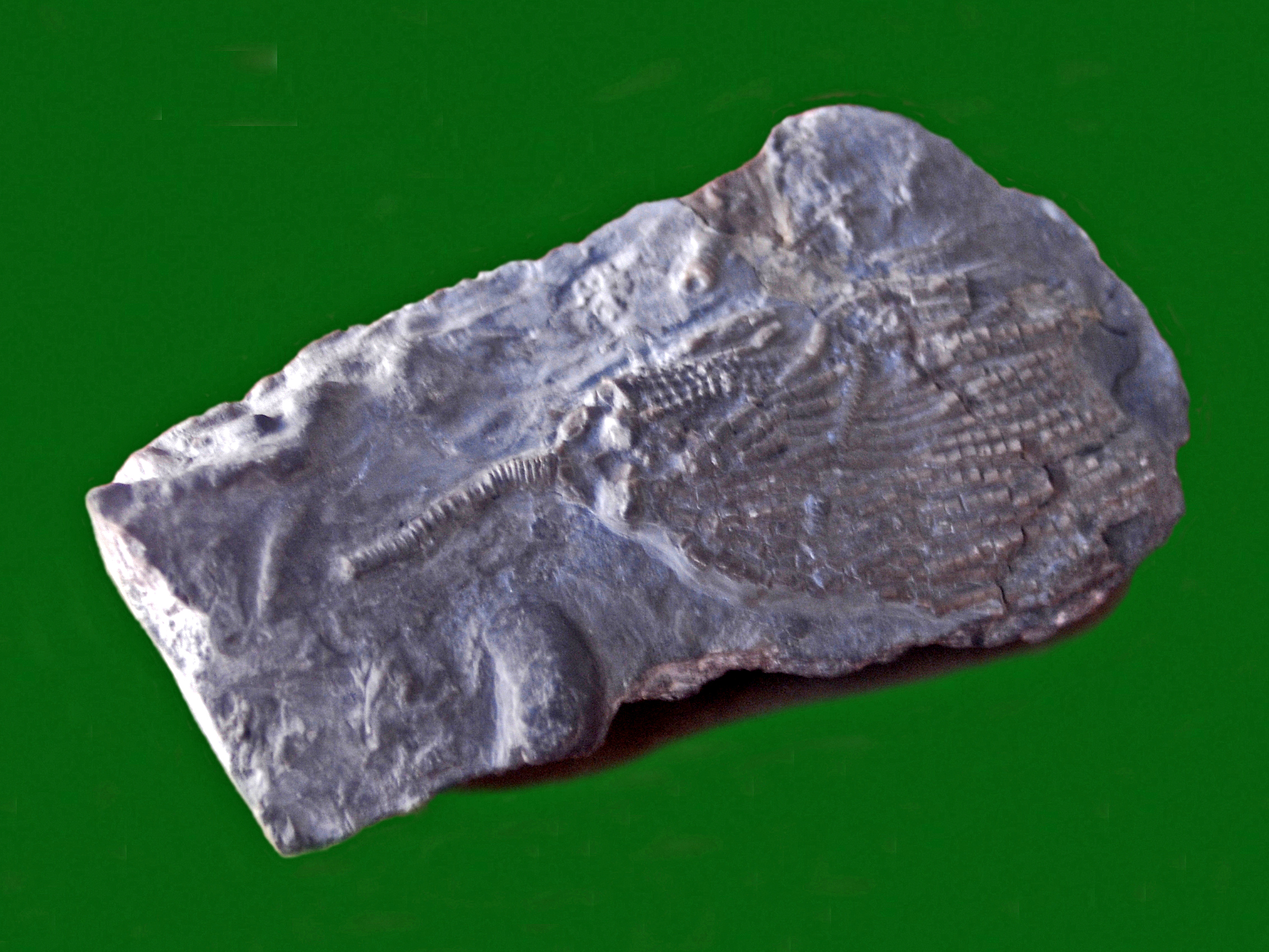
- Cyathocrinus goniodactylus, on display at Galerie de paléontologie et d'anatomie comparée in Paris

Scientific classification
- Kingdom: Animalia
- Phylum: Echinodermata
- Class: Crinoidea
- Parvclass: Cladida
- Family: †Cyathocrinitidae; Roemer 1854

= Cyathocrinitidae =

Cyathocrinitidae Temporal range: Silurian–Permian

Extinct family of crinoids

Cyathocrinitidae is an extinct family of crinoids belonging to the order Cladida.

These stationary intermediate-level epifaunal suspension feeders lived from the Silurian to the Permian periods (436.0 - 254.0 Ma).

== Genera ==
- Cyathocrinites
- Cyathocrinus
- Gissocrinus
- Ichthyocrinus
- Meniscocrinus
- Occiducrinus
