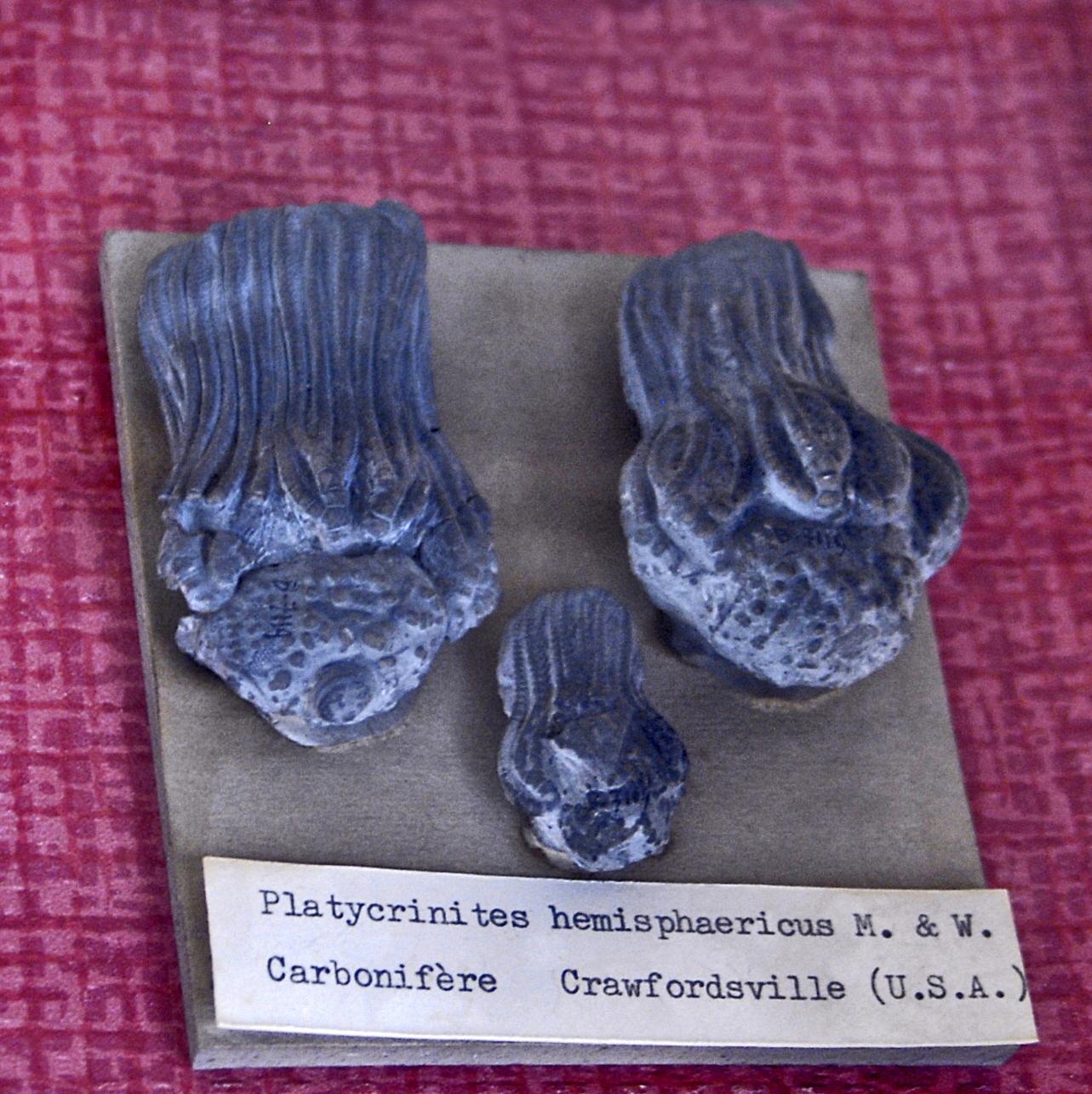
- Fossil specimens of Platycrinites hemisphaericus from United States, on display at Galerie de paléontologie et d'anatomie comparée in Paris

Scientific classification
- Kingdom: Animalia
- Phylum: Echinodermata
- Class: Crinoidea
- Order: †Monobathrida
- Family: †Platycrinitidae; Bassler 1938

= Platycrinitidae =

Platycrinitidae Temporal range: Devonian–Permian

Extinct family of crinoids

Platycrinitidae is an extinct family of Paleozoic stalked crinoids.

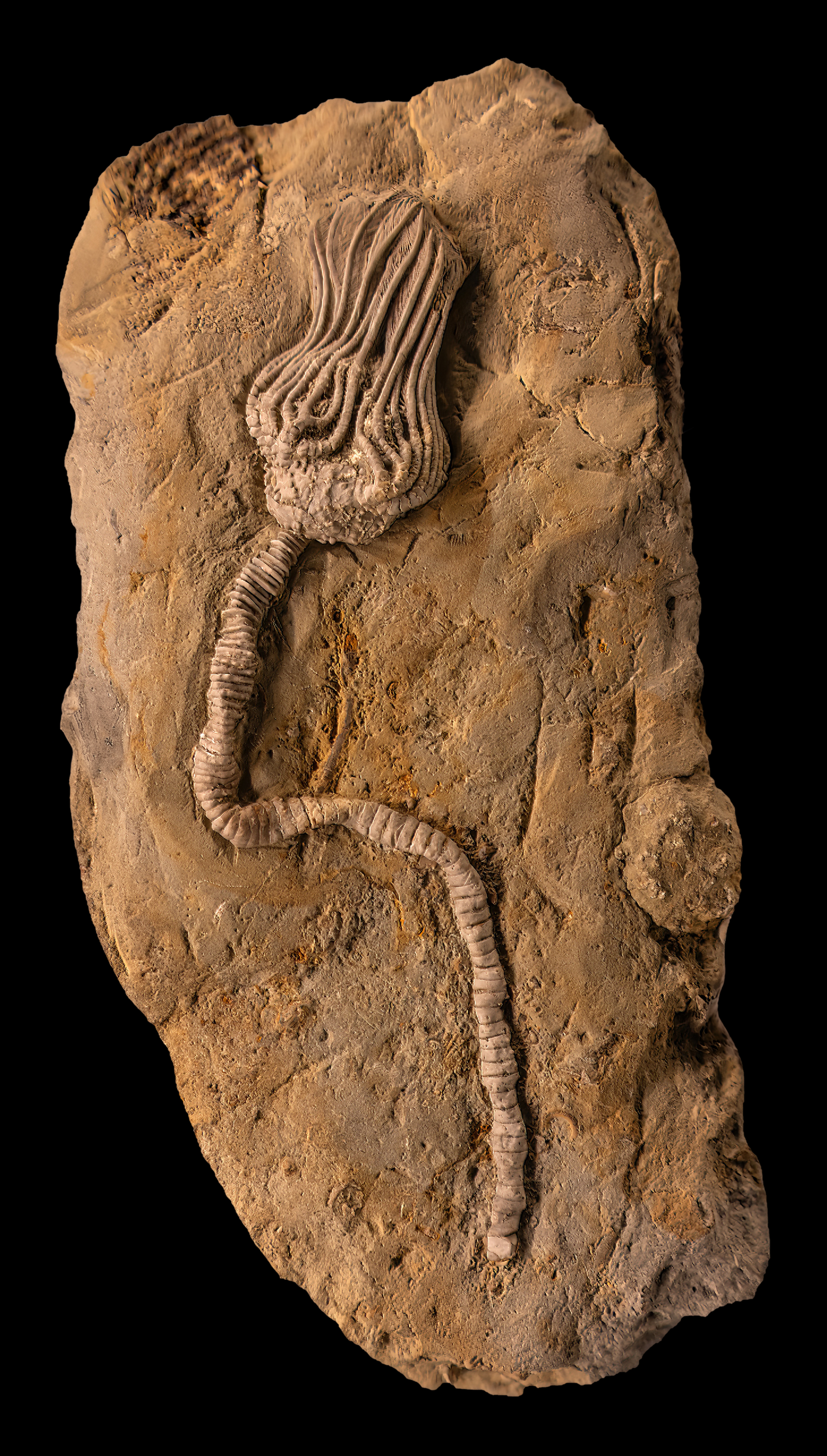
Platycrinites hemisphaericus. Early Carboniferous, Muldraugh Formation, Indiana. At the Royal Tyrrell Museum of Palaeontology.

These stationary upper-level epifaunal suspension feeders lived during the Devonian, Permian and the Carboniferous periods, from 416.0 to 259.0 Ma.

== Genera ==
- Camptocrinus
- Neoplatycrinus
- Platycrinites
- Pleurocrinus
