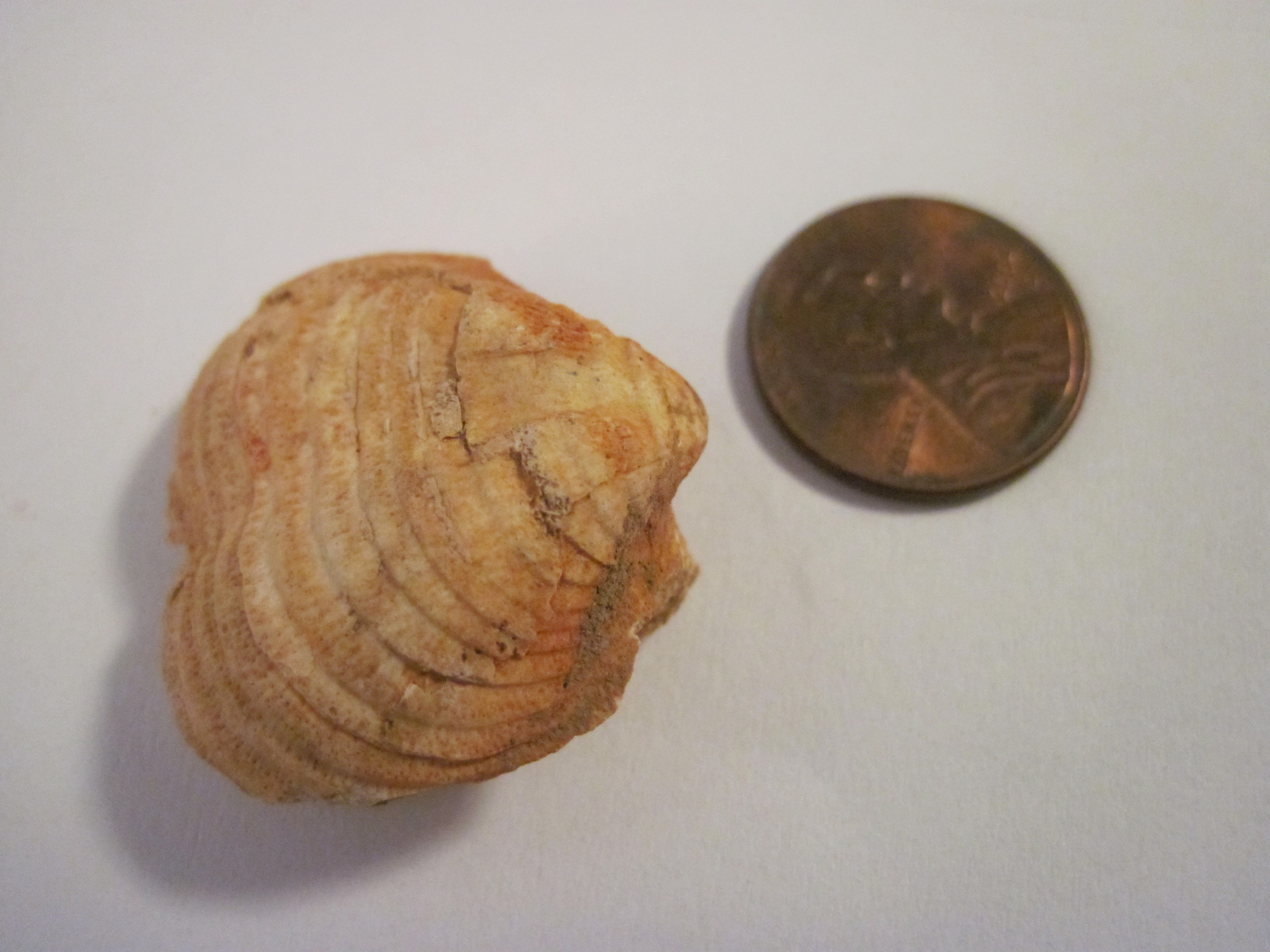
- Composita from the Boone Formation of northern Arkansas.

Scientific classification
- Kingdom: Animalia
- Phylum: Brachiopoda
- Class: Rhynchonellata
- Order: †Athyridida
- Family: †Athyrididae
- Subfamily: †Spirigerellinae
- Genus: †Composita; Brown, 1849

Species
- See text

= Composita =

Composita Temporal range: Late Devonian-Late Permian ~376–252 Ma

Genus of brachiopods

Composita is an extinct brachiopod genus that lived from the Late Devonian to the Late Permian. Composita had a cosmopolitan global distribution, having lived on every continent except Antarctica. Composita had a smooth shell with a more or less distinct fold and sulcus and a round opening for the pedicle on the pedicle valve. Composita is included in the family Athyrididae (Order Athyridida) and placed in the subfamily Spirigerellinae.

Related genera include Cariothyris and Planalvus along with Athyris.

== Species ==
The following species within this genus have been described:

- C. advena (Grant, 1976)
- C. affinis Girty, 1909
- C. apheles Cooper and Grant, 1976
- C. apsidata Cooper and Grant, 1976
- C. bamberi Shi and Waterhouse, 1996
- C. biforma Yang, 1991
- C. bucculenta Cooper and Grant, 1976
- C. costata Cooper and Grant, 1976
- C. cracens Cooper and Grant, 1976
- C. crassa Cooper and Grant, 1976
- C. depressa Sun, 1991
- C. discina Cooper and Grant, 1976
- C. elongata Dunbar and Condra, 1932
- C. emarginata (Girty, 1909)
- C. enormis Cooper and Grant, 1976
- C. girtyi Raymond, 1911
- C. grandis Cooper, 1953
- C. hapsida Stehli and Grant, 1970
- C. huagongensis Liao, 1979
- C. idahoensis Butts, 2007
- C. imbricata Cooper and Grant, 1976
- C. indosinensis (Mansuy, 1914)
- C. insulcata Zeng et al., 1995
- C. jogensis Yanagida & Nishikawa, 1984
- C. magnicarina Campbell, 1961
- C. mexicana (Hall, 1857)
- C. minuscula Chronic, 1949
- C. mira (Girty, 1899)
- C. misriensis (Reed, 1944)
- C. nucella Cooper and Grant, 1976
- C. ovata (Mather, 1915)
- C. parasulcata Cooper and Grant, 1976
- C. pilula Cooper and Grant, 1976
- C. plana Yancey, 1978
- C. prospera Cooper and Grant, 1976
- C. pyriformis Cooper and Grant, 1976
- C. quadrirotunda (Lee and Su, 1980)
- C. quantilla Cooper and Grant, 1976
- C. rotunda Snider, 1915
- C. sigma Gordon, 1975
- C. stalagmium Cooper and Grant, 1976
- C. strongyle Cooper and Grant, 1976
- C. subcircularis Brill, 1940
- C. subquadrata (Hall, 1858)
- C. subtilita (Hall, 1852)
- C. tareica Chernyak, 1963
- C. tetralobata Hoare, 1960
- C. tobaensis Wang, 1985
- C. trinuclea (Hall, 1956)
