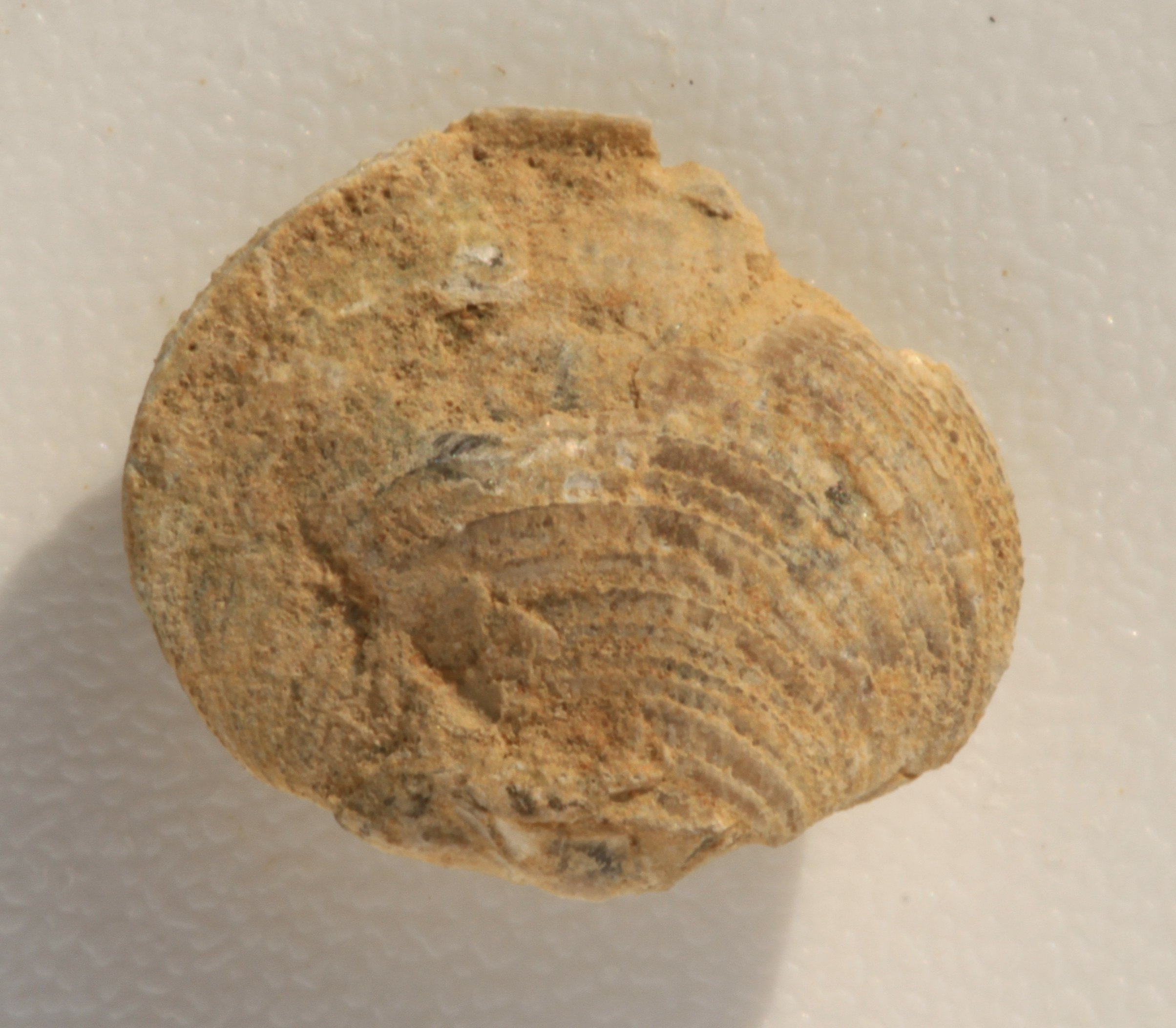
- Cleiothyridina sublamellosa, 13mm along the axis, pedunculate valve, found near Blount, Alabama, USA, from the Lower Carboniferous (Mississippian) (Bangor)

Scientific classification
- Kingdom: Animalia
- Phylum: Brachiopoda
- Class: Rhynchonellata
- Order: †Athyridida
- Family: †Athyrididae
- Subfamily: †Cleiothyrididinae
- Genus: †Cleiothyridina; Buckman, 1906

Species
- See text

Synonyms
- †Cleiothyridellina Waterhouse, 1978

= Cleiothyridina =

Cleiothyridina Temporal range: 388.1–252.17 Ma

Extinct genus of brachiopods

Cleiothyridina is an extinct genus of brachiopods.

== Species ==
- †Cleiothyridina accola (Reed 1944)
- †Cleiothyridina acutomarginalis (Waagen 1883)
- †Cleiothyridina ailakensis Reed 1925
- †Cleiothyridina anabathra Waterhouse 1968
- †Cleiothyridina attenuata Cooper 1957
- †Cleiothyridina bajkurica (Chernyak 1963)
- †Cleiothyridina bajtuganensis (Netschajew 1911)
- †Cleiothyridina baracoodensis (Etheridge 1903)
- †Cleiothyridina barbata Chronic 1949
- †Cleiothyridina capillata (Waagen 1883)
- †Cleiothyridina circularis (Ustritsky 1960)
- †Cleiothyridina ciriacksi Cooper and Grant 1976
- †Cleiothyridina corculum Lee & Su 1980
- †Cleiothyridina dalmiriensis (Reed 1944)
- †Cleiothyridina davidsoni (Rigaux 1873)
- †Cleiothyridina deroissyi (Leveille 1835)
- †Cleiothyridina dilimensis Grunt 1977
- †Cleiothyridina echidniformis Waterhouse 1983
- †Cleiothyridina elegans Girty, 1910
- †Cleiothyridina epigona (Abich 1878)
- †Cleiothyridina excavata (Grabau 1931)
- †Cleiothyridina globulina (Waagen 1883)
- †Cleiothyridina grossula (Waagen 1883)
- †Cleiothyridina hayasakai Tazawa 2010
- †Cleiothyridina interposita (Reed 1944)
- †Cleiothyridina intonsa Chronic 1949
- †Cleiothyridina laminosa Fang 1994
- †Cleiothyridina laqueata Waterhouse 1968
- †Cleiothyridina macleayana (Etheridge 1889)
- †Cleiothyridina maynci Dunbar 1955
- †Cleiothyridina mulsa Cooper and Grant 1976
- †Cleiothyridina nana Cooper and Grant 1976
- †Cleiothyridina nielseni Dunbar 1955
- †Cleiothyridina nikolaevi Grunt 1977
- †Cleiothyridina orbicularis (McChesney 1859)
- †Cleiothyridina ovalis Shi 1993
- †Cleiothyridina pectinifera (Sowerby 1841)
- †Cleiothyridina perthensis Archbold 1997
- †Cleiothyridina pijaensis Waterhouse 1983
- †Cleiothyridina pilularis Cooper and Grant 1976
- †Cleiothyridina planus Waterhouse 2024
- †Cleiothyridina rara Cooper and Grant 1976
- †Cleiothyridina rectimarginata Cooper and Grant 1976
- †Cleiothyridina royssii (syn. Athyris royssii)
- †Cleiothyridina saraiensis (Reed 1944)
- †Cleiothyridina semiconcava (Waagen 1883)
- †Cleiothyridina seriata Grant 1976
- †Cleiothyridina shenshuensis (Lee and Su 1980)
- †Cleiothyridina simulans (Reed 1931)
- †Cleiothyridina solovjevae Grunt 1977
- †Cleiothyridina subexpansa (Waagen, 1883)
- †Cleiothyridina sublamellosa
- †Cleiothyridina tribulosa Grant 1976
- †Cleiothyridina tschironensis Kotlyar 1968
- †Cleiothyridina uralica (Grabau 1934)
- †Cleiothyridina warchensis Reed 1944
- †Cleiothyridina xetriformis (Reed 1944)
- †Cleiothyridina zhexiensis Liang 1982

== See also ==
- List of brachiopod genera
