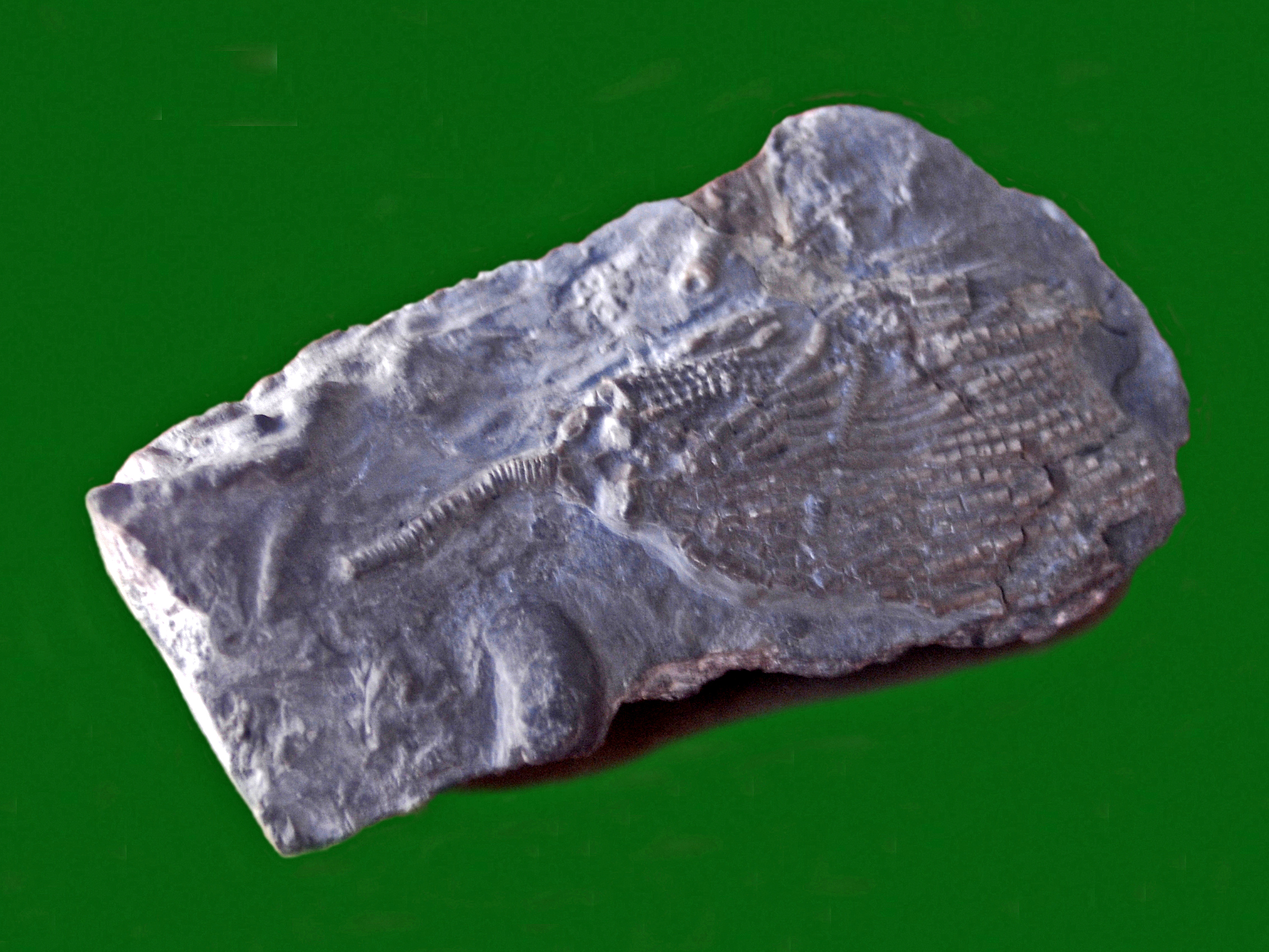
- Cyathocrinus goniodactylus, on display at Galerie de paléontologie et d'anatomie comparée in Paris

Scientific classification
- Kingdom: Animalia
- Phylum: Echinodermata
- Class: Crinoidea
- Family: †Cyathocrinitidae
- Genus: †Cyathocrinus; Miller 1821

= Cyathocrinus =

Cyathocrinus Temporal range: Silurian–Permian

Extinct genus of crinoids

Cyathocrinus is an extinct genus of crinoids belonging to the family Cyathocrinitidae.

It is considered related to genera like Cyathocrinites, Gissocrinus, Ichthyocrinus, Meniscocrinus, Occiducrinus.

These stationary intermediate-level epifaunal suspension feeders lived in the Permian of Australia and Pakistan, in the Devonian of the Czech Republic, as well as in the Silurian of the Czech Republic and Sweden, from 428.2 to 254.0 Ma.
