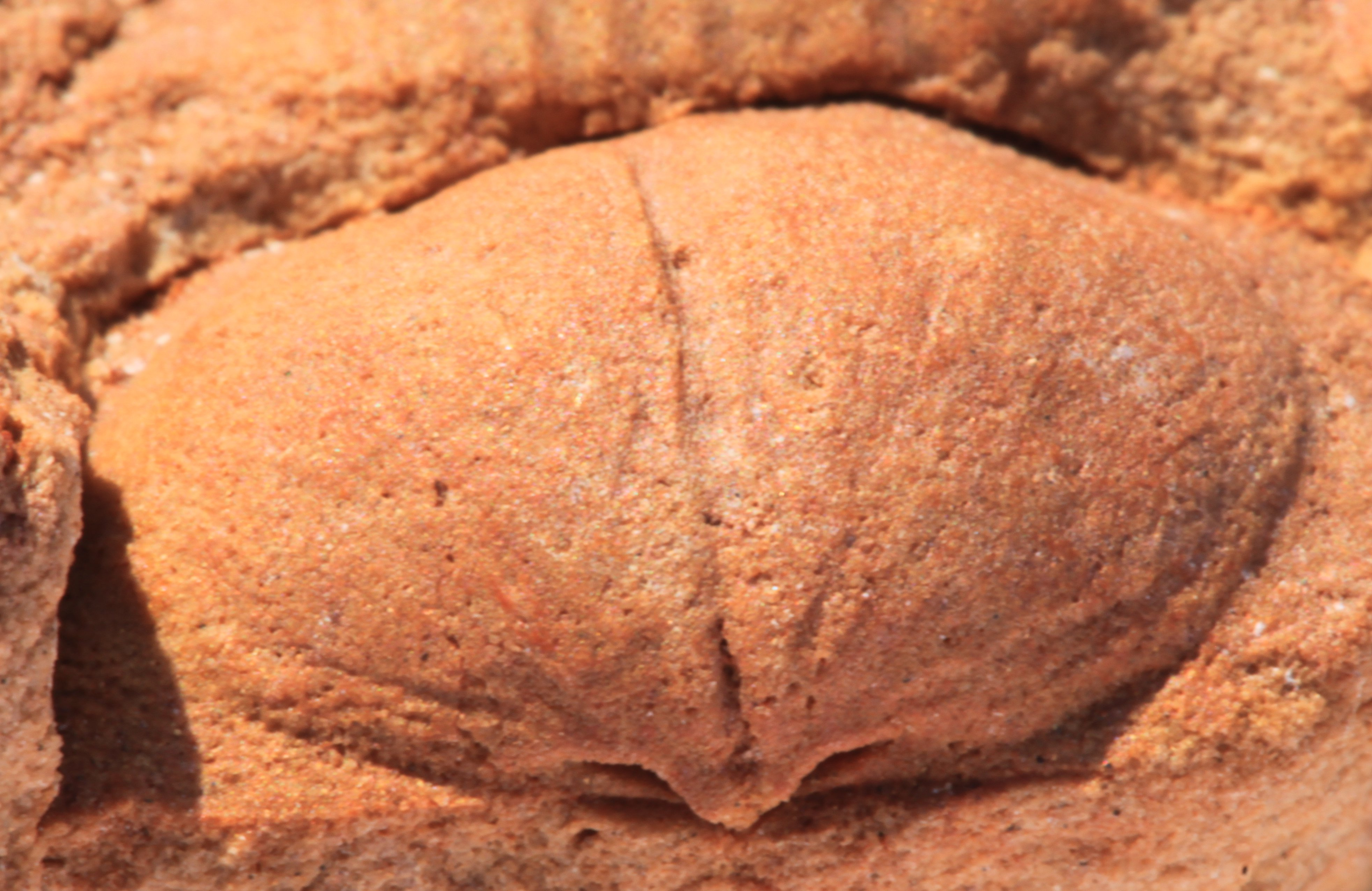
- Chonetes gracilis internal mould

Scientific classification
- Kingdom: Animalia
- Phylum: Brachiopoda
- Class: †Strophomenata
- Order: †Productida
- Family: †Chonetidae
- Subfamily: †Chonetinae
- Genus: †Chonetes; Fischer de Waldheim ,1830

Species
- See text

= Chonetes =

Chonetes Temporal range: Late Ordovician-Mid Jurassic ~460–175 Ma

Extinct genus of brachiopods

Chonetes is an extinct genus of brachiopods. It ranged from the Late Ordovician to the Middle Jurassic.

== Species ==
The following species of Chonetes have been described:

- C. baragwanathi
- C. billingsi (Floresta Formation, Colombia)
- C. burlingtonensis
- C. chamishkjensis
- C. chaoi
- C. cherokeensis
- C. chesterensis
- C. compressa
- C. comstockii (Floresta Fm.)
- C. concentricus
- C. deliciasensis
- C. flemingi
- C. foedus
- C. foshagi
- C. geniculata
- C. glabra
- C. glenparkensis
- C. gregarius
- C. illinoisensis
- C. logani
- C. mesoloba
- C. missouriensis
- C. moelleri
- C. monosensis
- C. multicosta
- C. obtusa
- C. oklahomensis
- C. ornata
- C. pinegensis
- C. planumbona
- C. posturalicus
- C. pygmoideus
- C. rarispina
- C. semiovalis
- C. shumardiana
- C. sichuanensis
- C. sinuatus
- C. squama
- C. stubeli (Floresta Fm.)
- C. suavis
- C. timanica
- C. variolaris

Names brought to synonymy

- Chonetes elegans L.B. Smyth 1922, a synonym for Chonetes speciosus - abundant in the shales associated with the main limestone near Ballycastle, Northern Ireland.
- Chonetes elegans L. G. de Koninck, 1847, a synonym for Plicochonetes elegans (L.G. de Koninck, 1847)
