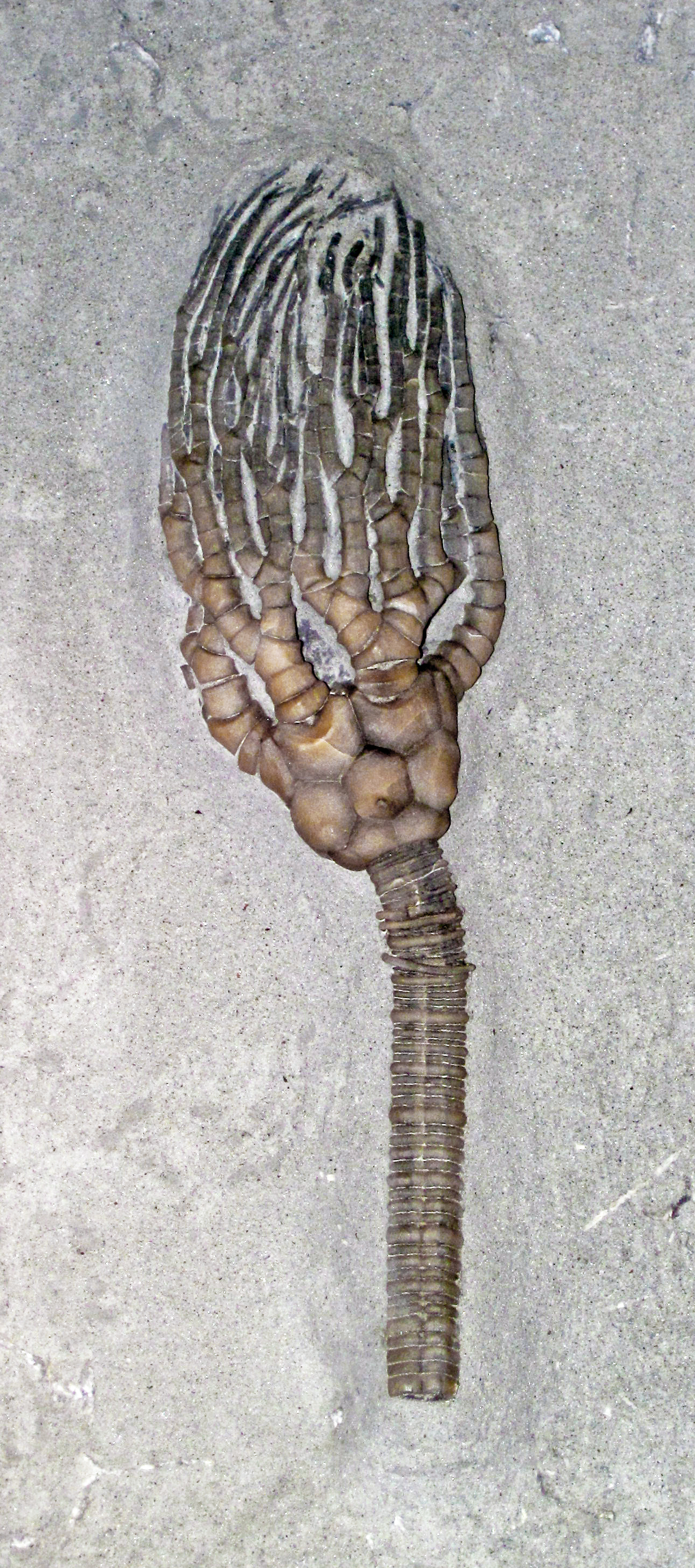
- Cyathocrinites multibrachiatus fossil

Scientific classification
- Kingdom: Animalia
- Phylum: Echinodermata
- Class: Crinoidea
- Family: †Cyathocrinitidae
- Genus: †Cyathocrinites; Miller, 1821

Species
- †Cyathocrinites multibrachiatus; †Cyathocrinites simplex

= Cyathocrinites =

Cyathocrinites Temporal range: llandovery–Lopingian

Extinct genus of crinoids

Cyathocrinites is an extinct genus of crinoids that lived from the Early Silurian to the Late Permian in Europe and North America.
