= Plicochonetes =

Plicochonetes Temporal range: 383.7–252.3 Ma

Scientific classification
- Kingdom: Animalia
- Phylum: Brachiopoda
- Class: †Strophomenata
- Order: †Productida
- Family: †Rugosochonetidae
- Subfamily: †Plicochonetinae
- Genus: †Plicochonetes; Paeckelmann, 1930

Species
- †Plicochonetes jilinensis; †Plicochonetes paeckelmanni; †Plicochonetes weiningensis

Synonyms
- Chonetes (Plicochonetes)

Extinct genus of brachiopods

Plicochonetes is a genus of brachiopods in the extinct family Rugosochonetidae.

Chonetes elegans L. G. de Koninck, 1847 is a synonym for Plicochonetes elegans (L.G. de Koninck, 1847)
