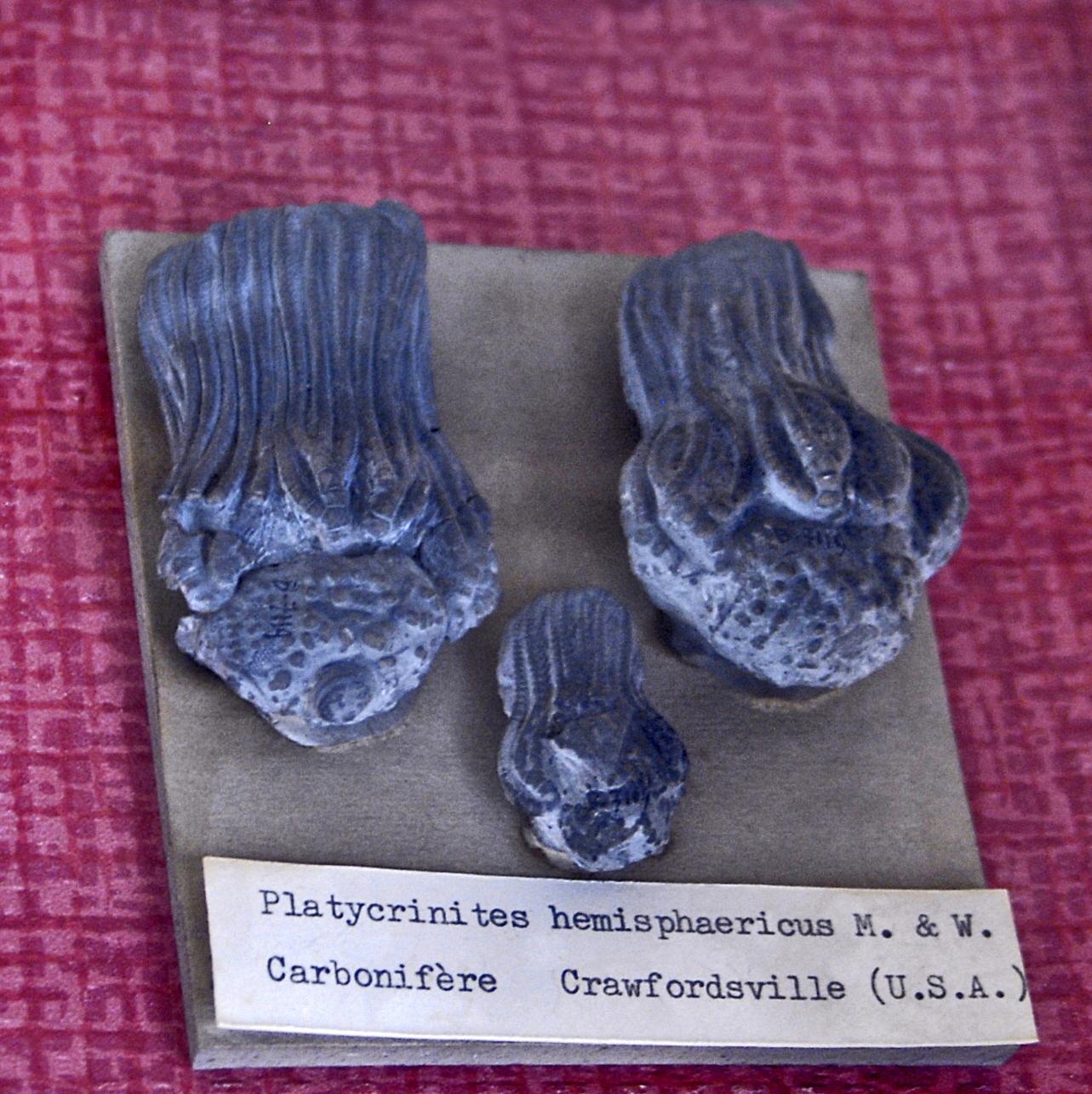
- Fossil specimens of Platycrinites hemisphaericus from United States, on display at Galerie de paléontologie et d'anatomie comparée in Paris

Scientific classification
- Kingdom: Animalia
- Phylum: Echinodermata
- Class: Crinoidea
- Order: †Monobathrida
- Family: †Platycrinitidae
- Genus: †Platycrinites; Miller 1821

= Platycrinites =

Platycrinites Temporal range: Devonian–Permian

Extinct genus of crinoids

Platycrinites are an extinct genus of Paleozoic stalked crinoids belonging to the family Platycrinitidae.

These stationary upper-level epifaunal suspension feeders lived during the Devonian, Permian and the Carboniferous periods, from 376.1 to 259.0 Ma.

== Species ==
- Platycrinites crokeri Campbell and Bein 1971
- Platycrinites ellesmerense Broadhead and Strimple 1977
- Platycrinites halos Webster and Jell 1999
- Platycrinites hemisphaericus (Meek & Worthen)
- Platycrinites nikondaense Broadhead and Strimple 1977
- Platycrinites omanensis Webster and Sevastopulo 2007
- Platycrinites testudo Campbell and Bein 1971
- Platycrinites wachsmuthi Wanner 1916
- Platycrinites wrighti Marez-Oyens 1940

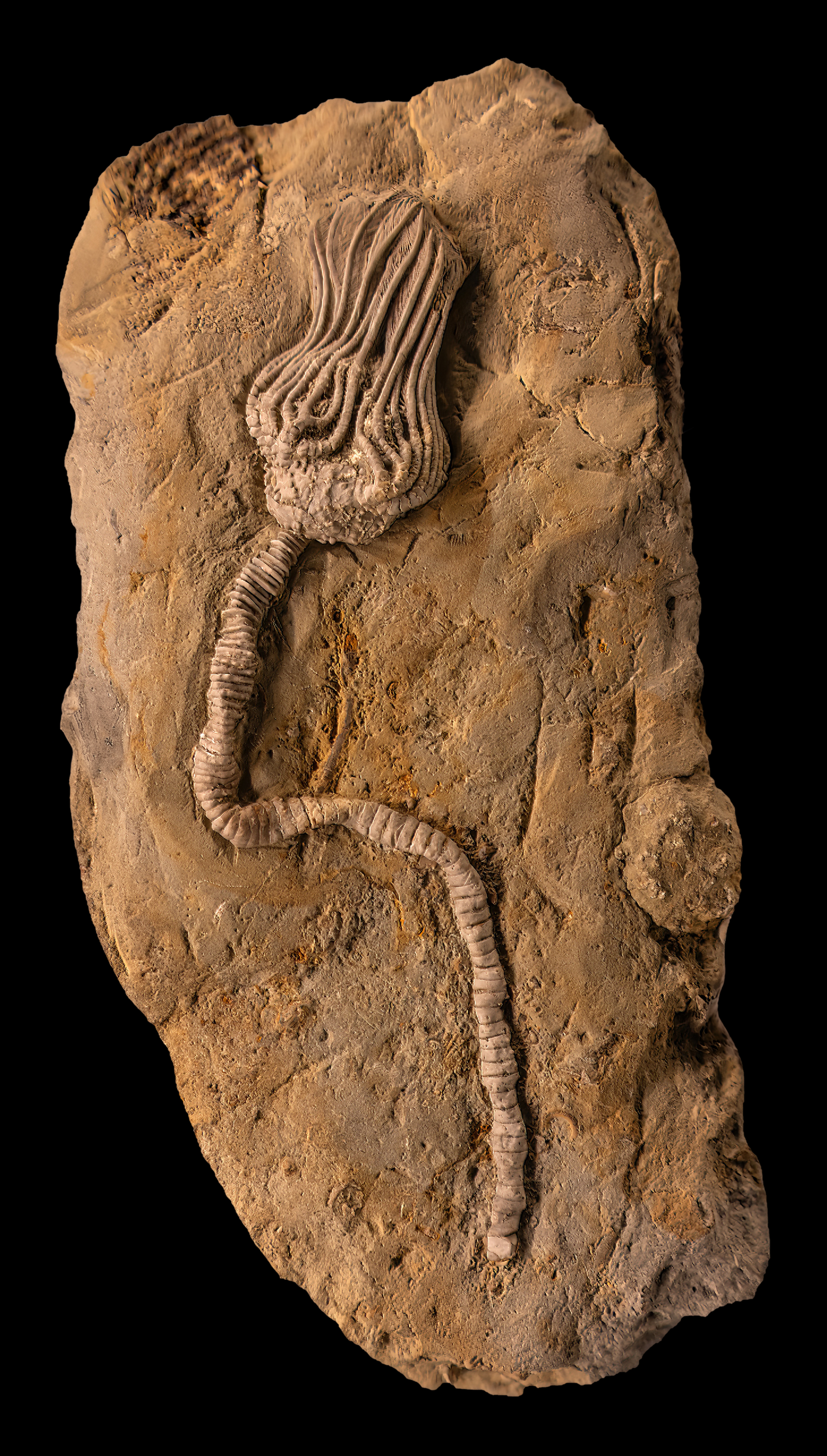
Platycrinites hemisphaericus. Early Carboniferous, Muldraugh Formation, Indiana. At the Royal Tyrrell Museum of Palaeontology.

== Description ==
These moderate sized extinct crinoids had a columnar stem with a twisted pattern. On top of the stem was a calyx with a number of feather-like arms.

== Distribution ==
Fossils of this genus have been found in the Devonian of Germany, in the Carboniferous of Australia, Canada, China, Ireland, United Kingdom, United States. As well as in the Permian of Australia, Canada, Indonesia, Oman and United States.
