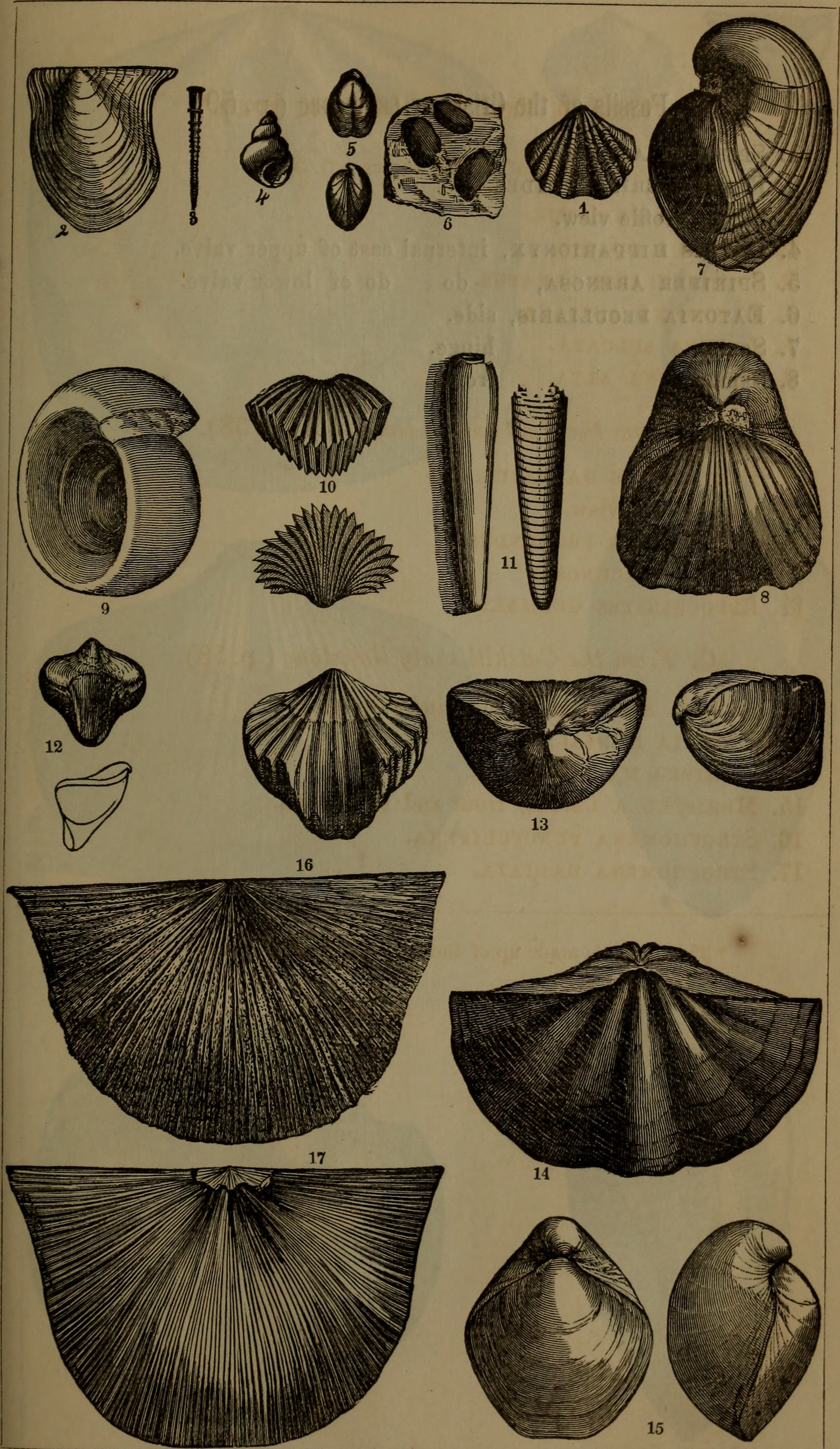
- Meristella laevis, front and side views (nr. 15)

Scientific classification
- Kingdom: Animalia
- Phylum: Brachiopoda
- Class: Rhynchonellata
- Order: †Athyridida
- Family: †Meristellidae
- Subfamily: †Meristellinae
- Genus: †Meristella; Hall, 1859

Species
- Meristella laevis; Meristella robertsensis; Meristella wheeleri

= Meristella =

Meristella Temporal range: Late Silurian-Late Devonian ~418–360 Ma

Extinct genus of brachiopods

Meristella is an extinct genus of brachiopods found from the Late Silurian to the Late Devonian. They are characterized by a smooth oval shell and a prominent incurved beak on the pedicle valve. Meristella is placed in the family Meristellidae of the articulate brachiopod order Athyridida.

Related genera include Charionella, Meristelloides, and Pentagonia.
