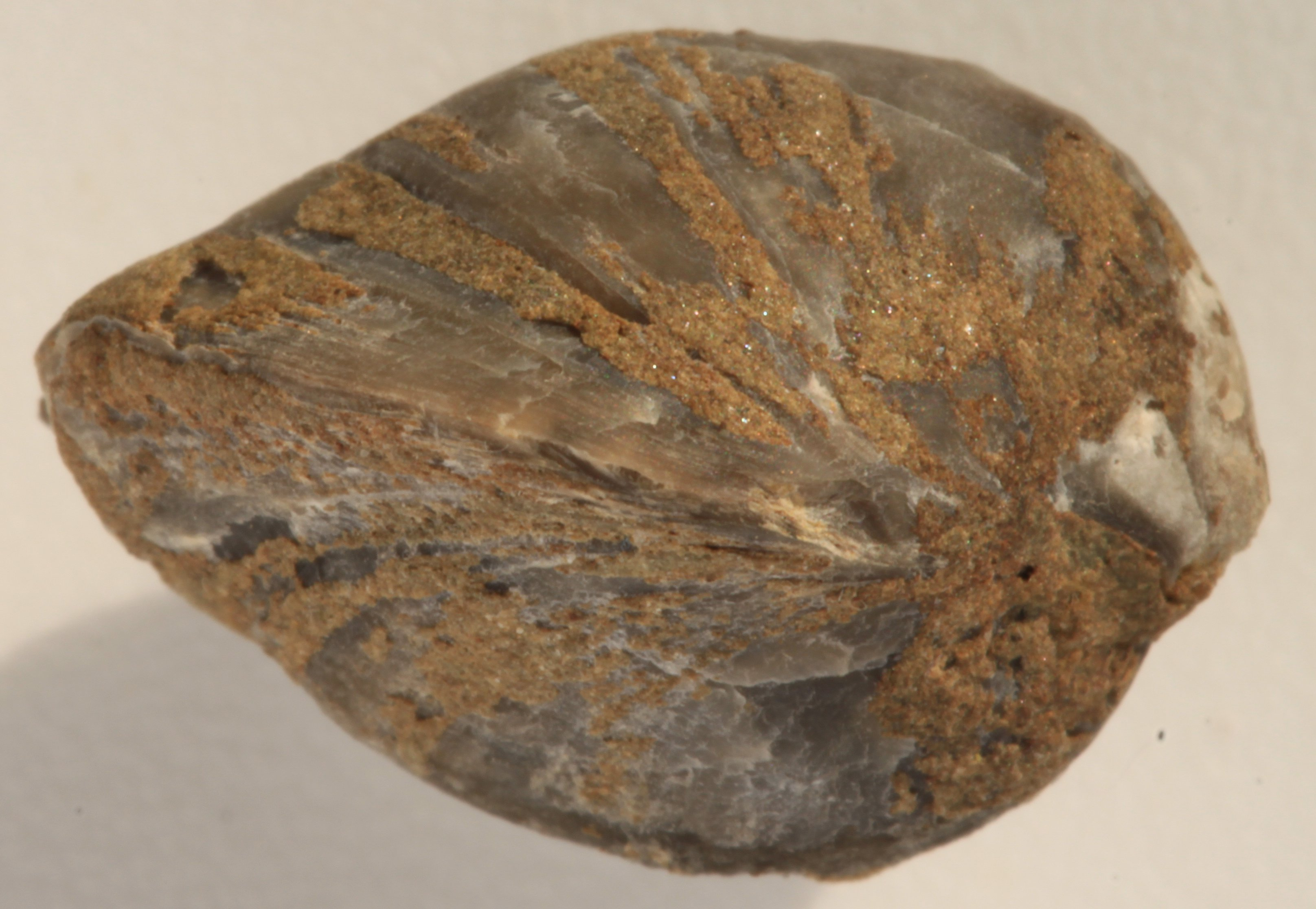
- Athyris concentrica

Scientific classification
- Kingdom: Animalia
- Phylum: Brachiopoda
- Class: Rhynchonellata
- Order: †Athyridida
- Family: †Athyrididae
- Subfamily: †Athyridinae
- Genus: †Athyris; McCoy, 1844

Species
- A. concentrica (Von Buch, 1834) type = Terebratula concentrica; A. lamellosa (Léveillé); A. vittata Hall

Synonyms
- Cliothyris, Spirithyris, Euthyris, Cleidothyris

= Athyris =

Athyris Temporal range: Lower Devonian - Triassic

Genus of brachiopods

Athyris is a brachiopod genus with a subequally biconvex shell that is generally wider than long and a range that extends from the Silurian into the Triassic. Athyris is the type genus for the Athyrididae, which belongs to the articulate order Athyridida. R.C. Moore (1952) gives a shorter range, from the Mid Devonian to the Lower Mississippian.

Alverezites, Bruntonites, and Meristospira are among related genera.

== Reassigned species ==
Some species originally included in Athyris have been reassigned.

- A. aliena = Septathyris aliena
- A. headi = Catazyga
- A. megalotis = Comelicania megalotis
- A. peracuta = Janiceps peracuta
- A. royssii = Cleiothyridina royssii
- A. umbonata = Hindella umbonata

== Ecology and taphonomy ==
Composition: low Mg calcite

Entire body: yes

Adult length: 10 to < 100

Adult width: 10 to < 100

Adult height: 10 to < 100

Folds: minor

Ribbing: minor

Spines: none

Internal reinforcement: none

Locomotion: stationary

Attached: yes

Life habit: low-level epifaunal

Diet: suspension feeder

Vision: blind

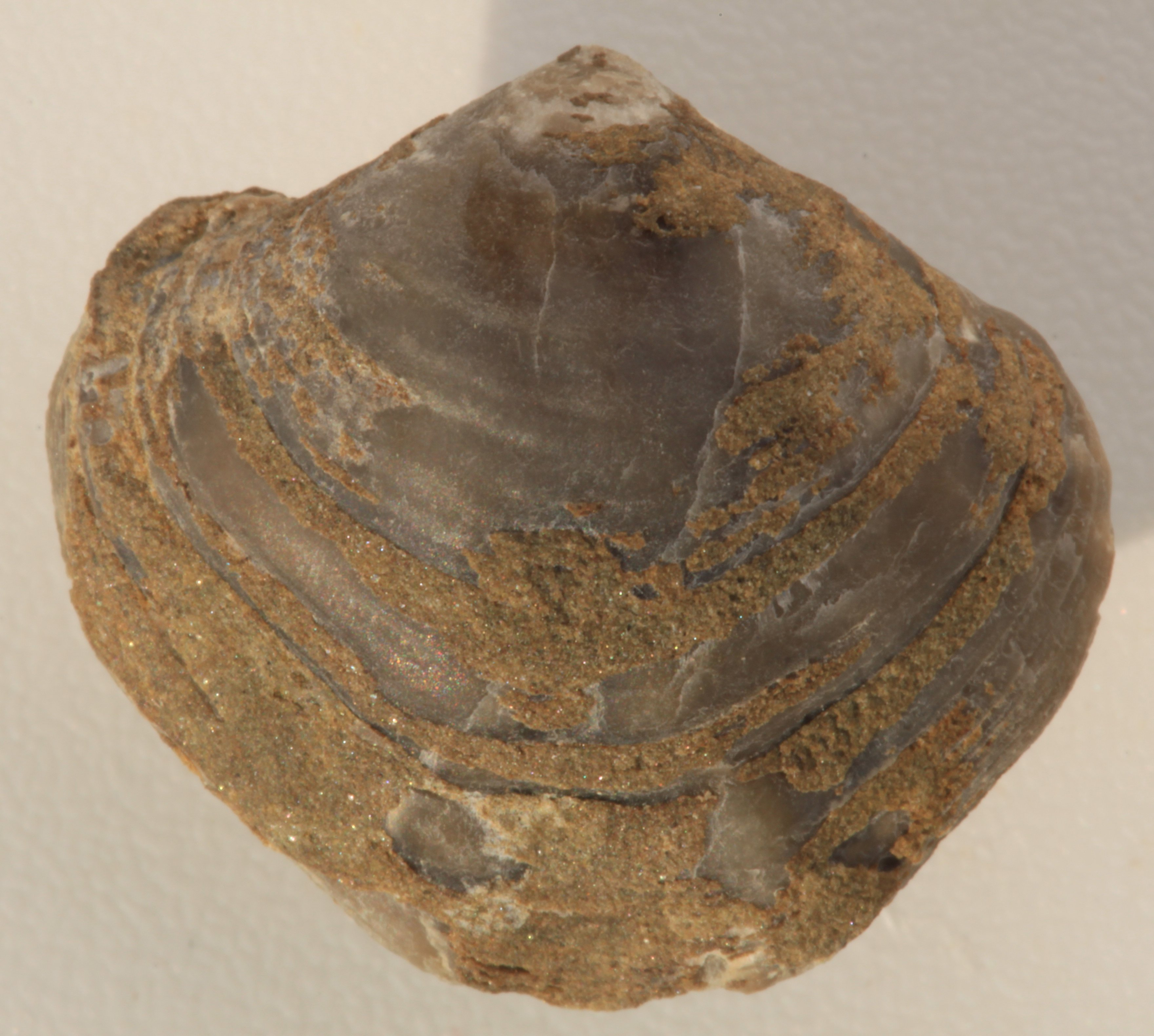
Athyris concentrica, pedicle valve

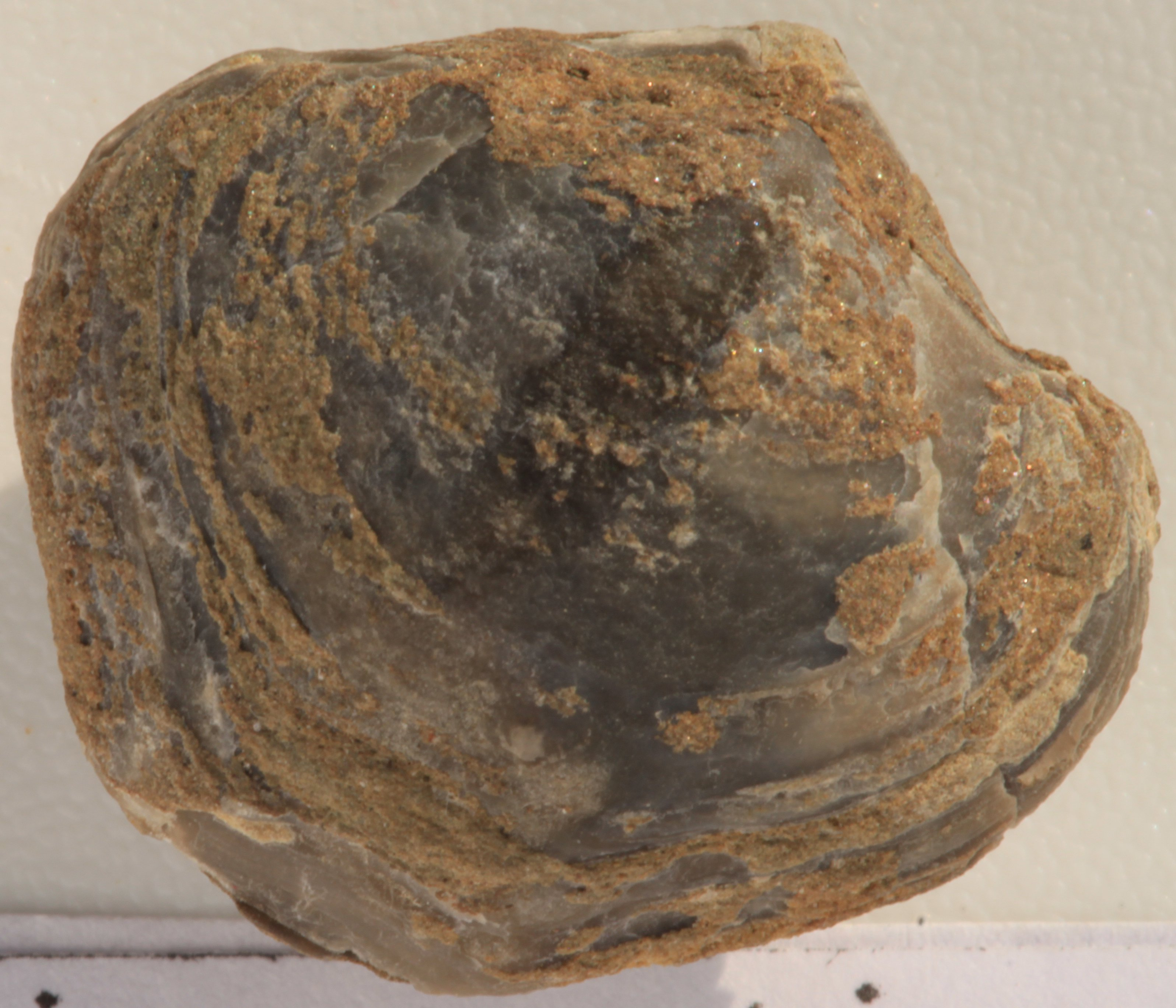
Athyris concentrica, brachial valve

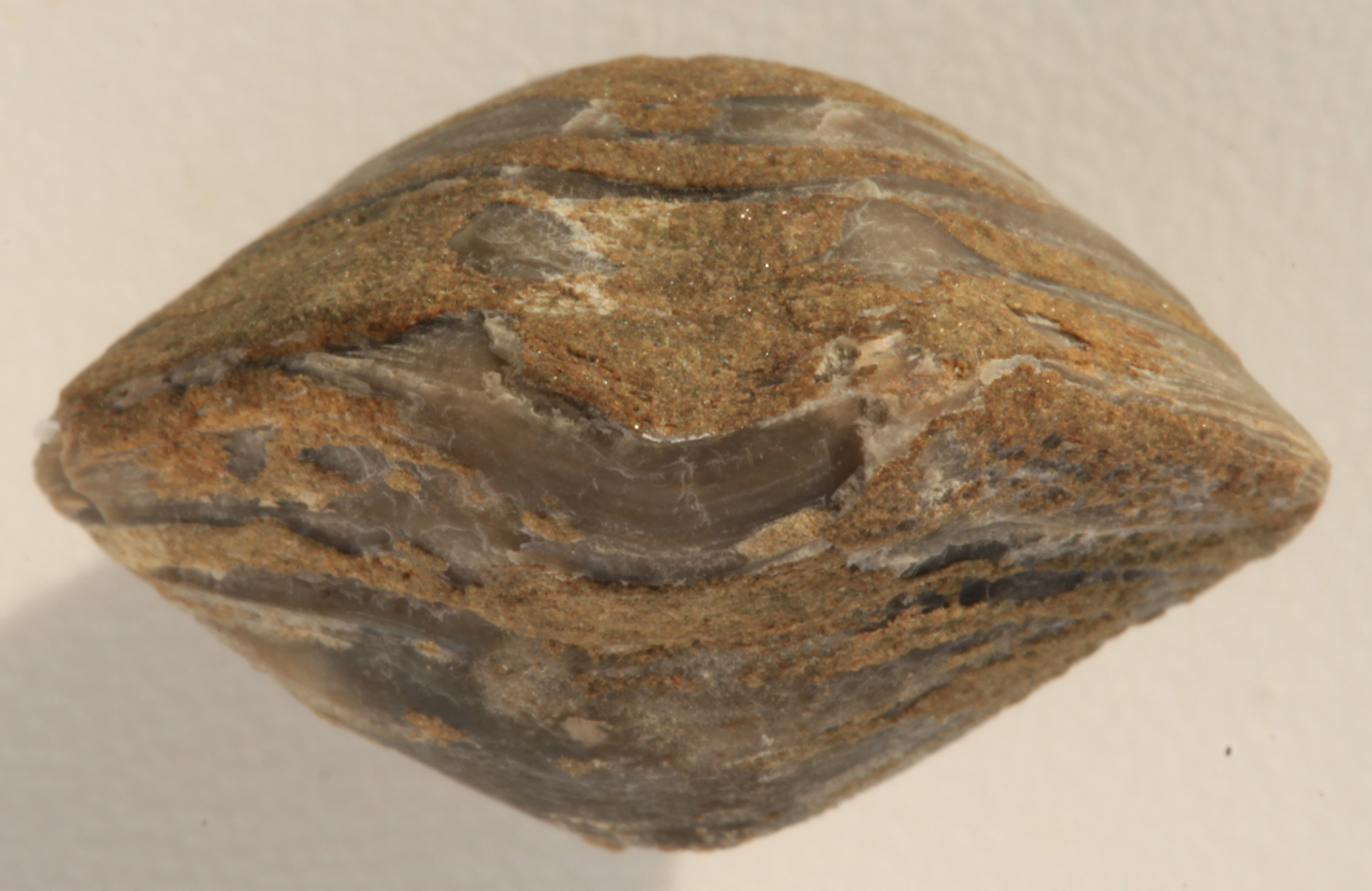
Athyris concentrica, anterior view

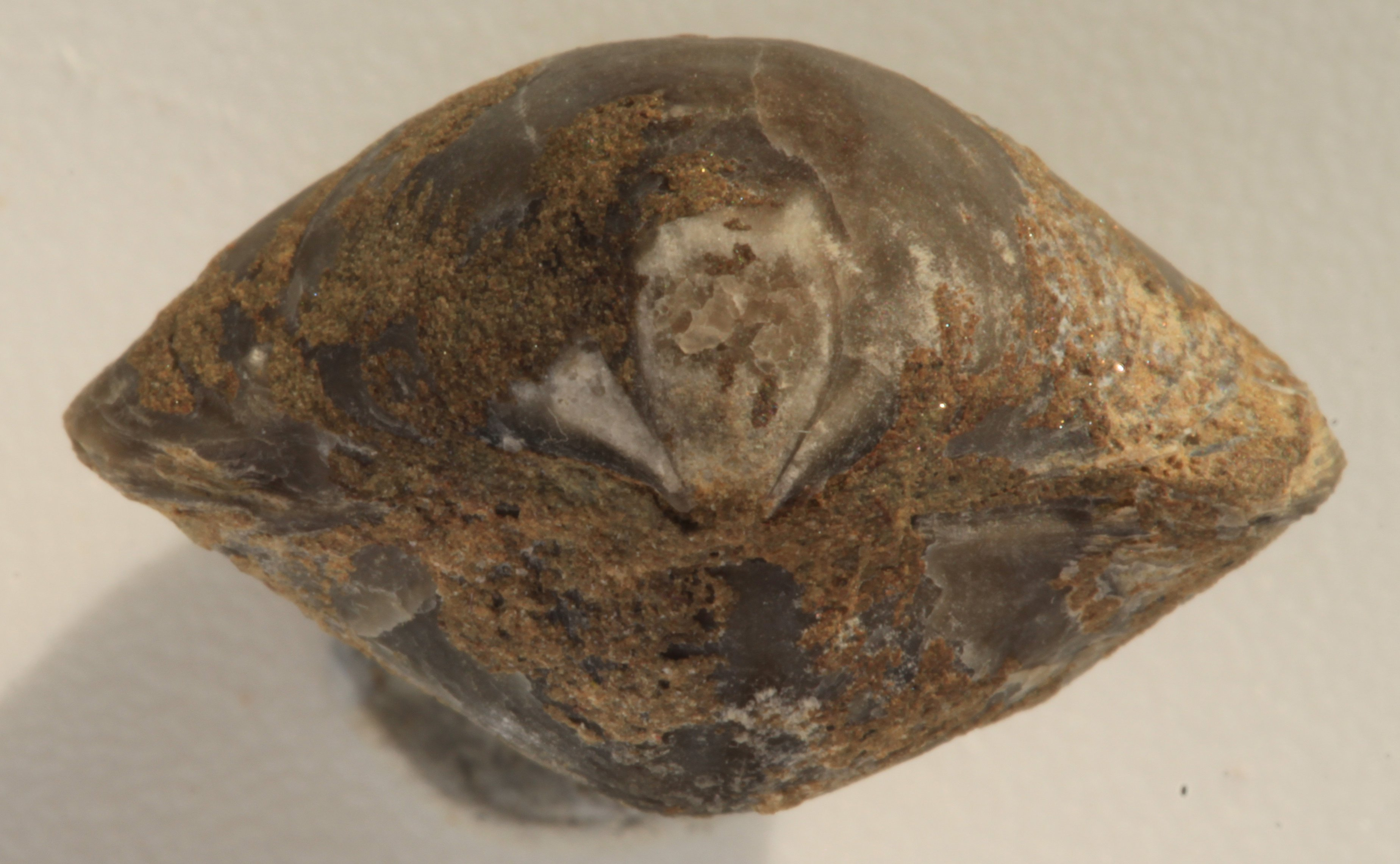
Athyris concentrica, posterior view

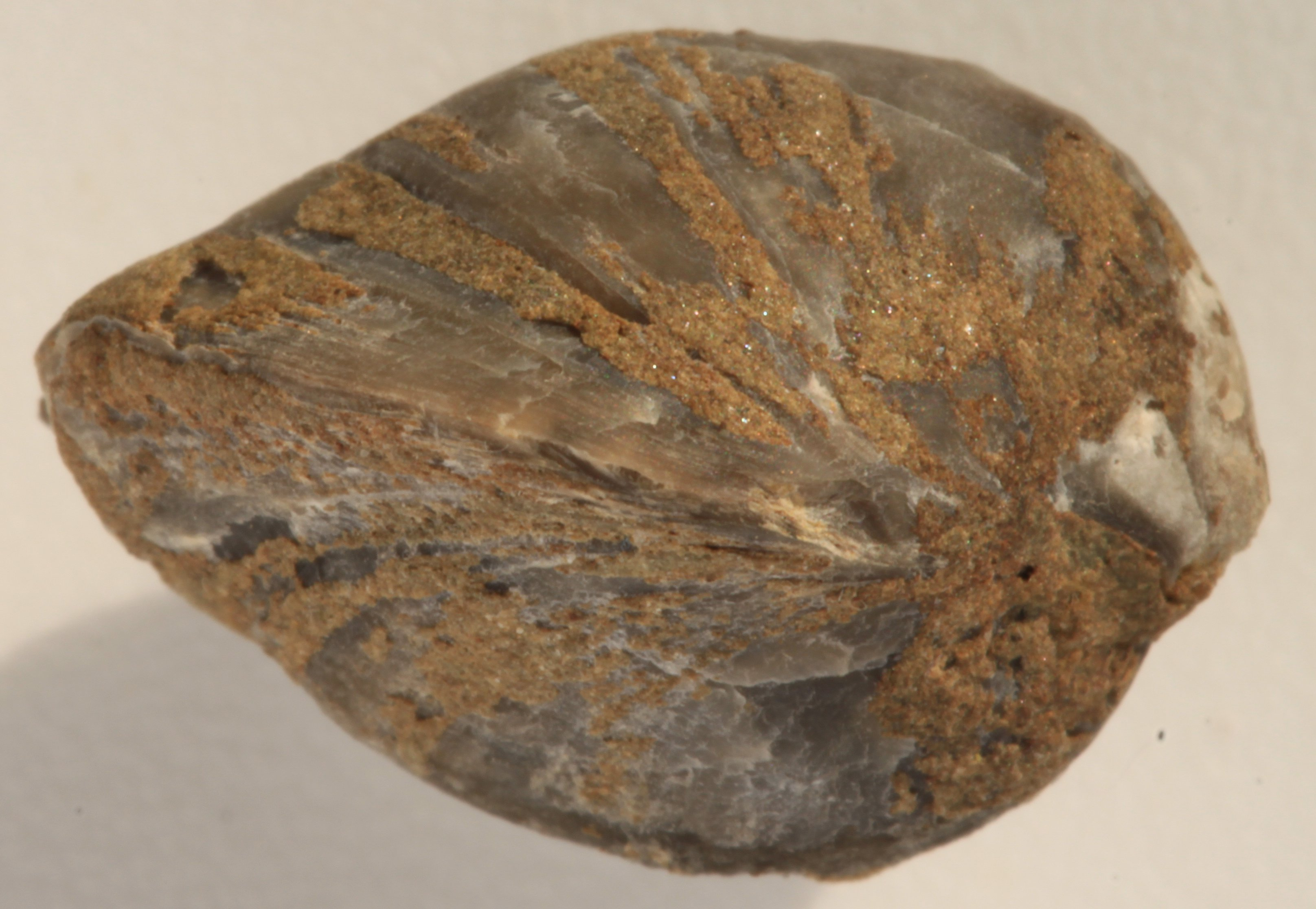
Athyris concentrica, lateral view

References: Aberhan et al. 2004, Hendy 2009
