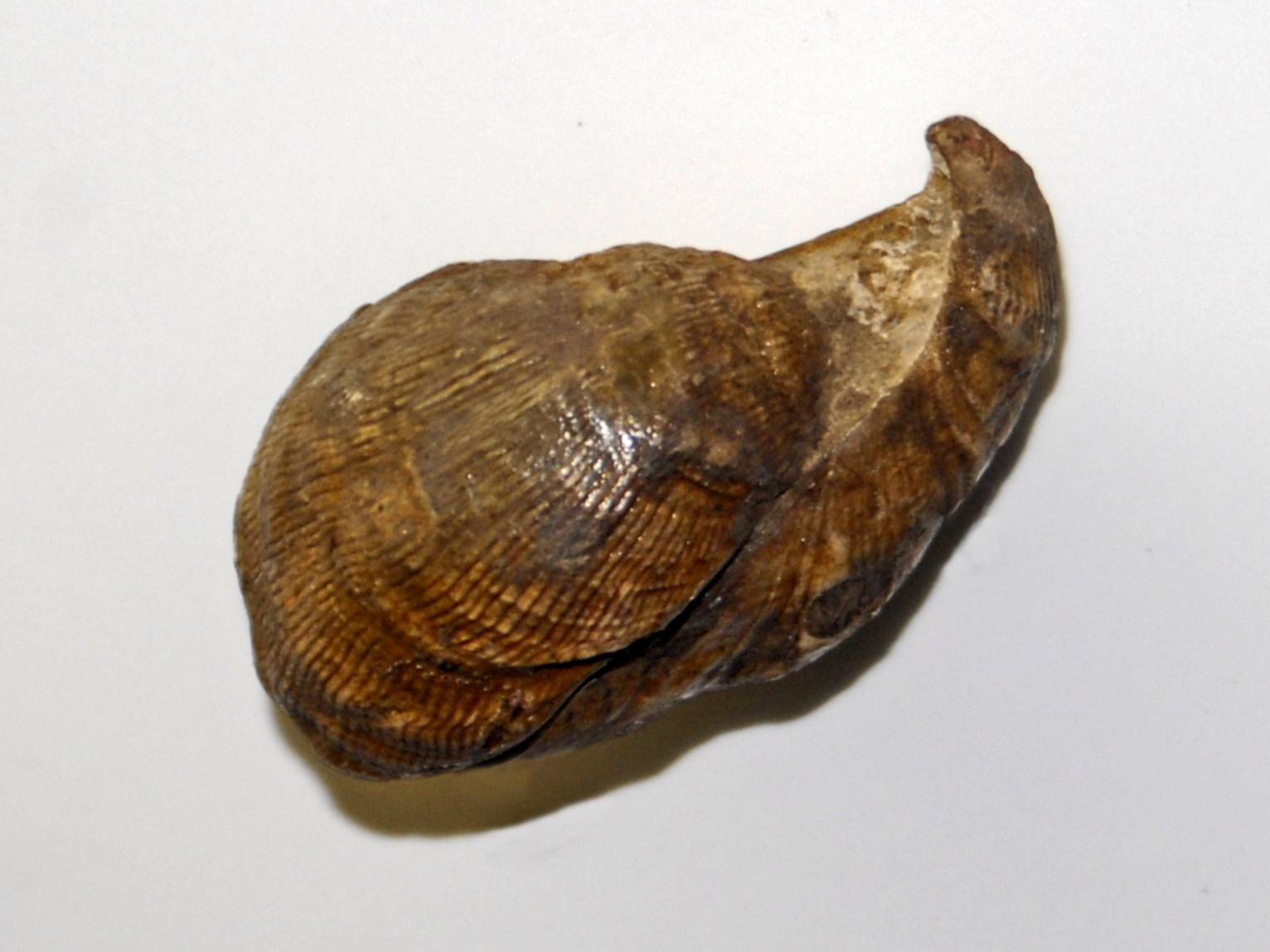
- Fossil specimen of Uncites gryphus from Germany, Devonian age

Scientific classification
- Kingdom: Animalia
- Phylum: Brachiopoda
- Class: Rhynchonellata
- Order: †Athyridida; Boucot, Johnson & Staton 1964

Suborders
- Athyriididina; Retziidina; Koninchinidina

= Athyridida =

Athyridida Temporal range: Lower Silurian - Early Jurassic

Extinct order of brachiopods

Athyridida is an order of Paleozoic brachiopods included in the Rhynchonellata, which makes up part of the articulate brachiopods.

The Athyridida are the Rostrospracea of R.C. Moore, 1952, considered at that time to be a suborder of the Spiriferida. As with the Spiriferida, the Athyridida have outwardly directed spiral brachidia that support the lophophores on either side, but instead have non-plicate shells with rounded outlines and prominent beaks but almost no interarea on the pedicle valve.

Athyridids began early in the Silurian, reached their greatest diversity in the following Devonian, and from then declined steadily until almost becoming extinct at the end of the Permian The order rejuvenated somewhat during the Triassic, only to decline again until becoming extinct in the Early Jurassic.

Athyris, Composita, and Meristella are representative genera. Three suborders have been defined.
