= List of the Paleozoic life of Iowa =

This list of the Paleozoic life of Iowa contains the various prehistoric life-forms whose fossilized remains have been reported from within the US state of Iowa and are between 538.8 and 252.17 million years of age.

== A ==
- †Abatocrinus
- †Acidaspis
- †Aclisina
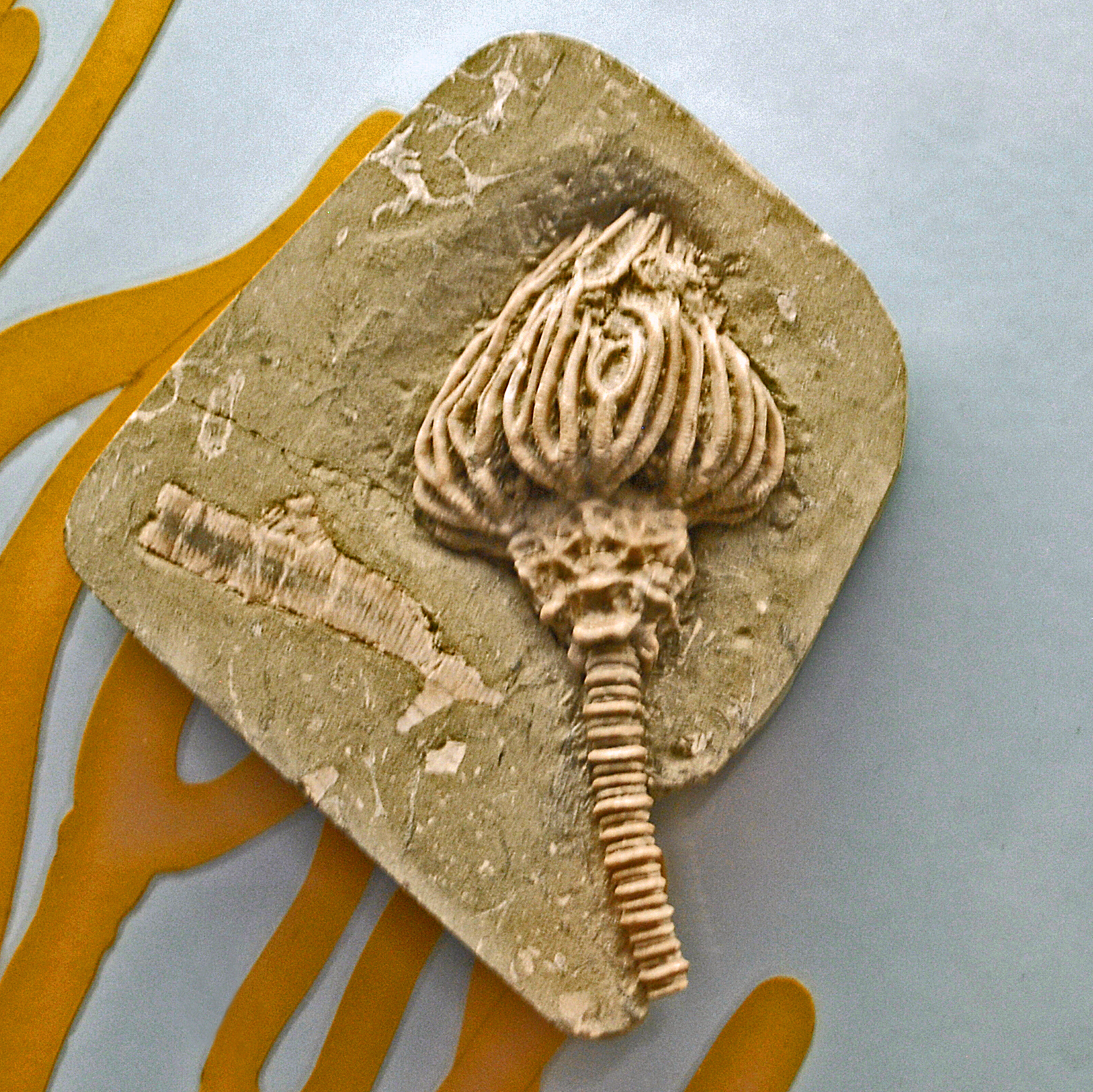
- Fossilized calyx and partial stem of the Devonian-Permian crinoid ("sea lily") Actinocrinites
  †Actinocrinites
  - †Actinocrinites gibsoni
  - †Actinocrinites jugosus
  - †Actinocrinites lowei
  - †Actinocrinites pernodosus
  - †Actinocrinites probolos
- †Actinopteria – tentative report
- †Actinostroma
  - †Actinostroma clathratum
- †Acutatheca
  - †Acutatheca propira
- †Adocetocystis
- †Adolfia
- †Aechmina
  - †Aechmina cuspidata
  - †Aechmina ionensis
  - †Aechmina maquiketensis
  - †Aechmina taurea
- †Agassizodus
  - †Agassizodus variabilis
- †Agelacrinites
- †Aglaocrinus
  - †Aglaocrinus compactus
- †Allanella
  - †Allanella allani
  - †Allanella annae
  - †Allanella cardinalis
- †Allenella
  - †Allenella allani
  - †Allenella annae
- †Allocrinus
  - †Allocrinus ornatus
  - †Allocrinus subglobosus
- †Allorhynchus
  - †Allorhynchus currei – or unidentified comparable form
- †Allozygocrinus
  - †Allozygocrinus dubuquensis
- †Alveolites
- †Ambocoelia
  - †Ambocoelia louisianaensis
  - †Ambocoelia minuta
- †Ambonychia
- †Americoncha
  - †Americoncha marginata
- †Amphicoelia
- †Amphicyrtoceras
- †Amphipora
  - †Amphipora pervesiculata
- †Amplexus
- †Anartiocystis
- †Anastrophia
- †Anataphrus
- †Anematina
  - †Anematina conica
- †Angyomphalus
  - †Angyomphalus lens
  - †Angyomphalus penelenticulata – type locality for species
- †Anisotrypa
- †Anomphalus
- †Anthracospirifer
  - †Anthracospirifer pellaensis
- †Antiquatonia
- †Antirhynchonella
- †Antirotella
  - †Antirotella kindlei – type locality for species
- †Aorocrinus
- †Aparchites
  - †Aparchites barbatus
  - †Aparchites carinatus
  - †Aparchites chatfieldensis
  - †Aparchites ellipticus
  - †Aparchites fimbriatus
  - †Aparchites macrus
  - †Aparchites paratumida
- †Aphelecrinus
- †Apycnodiscus
- †Arabellites
- †Arachnophyllum
- †Archaeocalyptocrininus
  - †Archaeocalyptocrininus iowensis
  - †Archaeocalyptocrininus nodosus
- †Archaeocalyptocrinus
  - †Archaeocalyptocrinus iowensis
  - †Archaeocalyptocrinus nodosus
- †Archaeocrinus
  - †Archaeocrinus obconicus
- †Archaeogastropod
- †Archinacella
  - †Archinacella rotunda
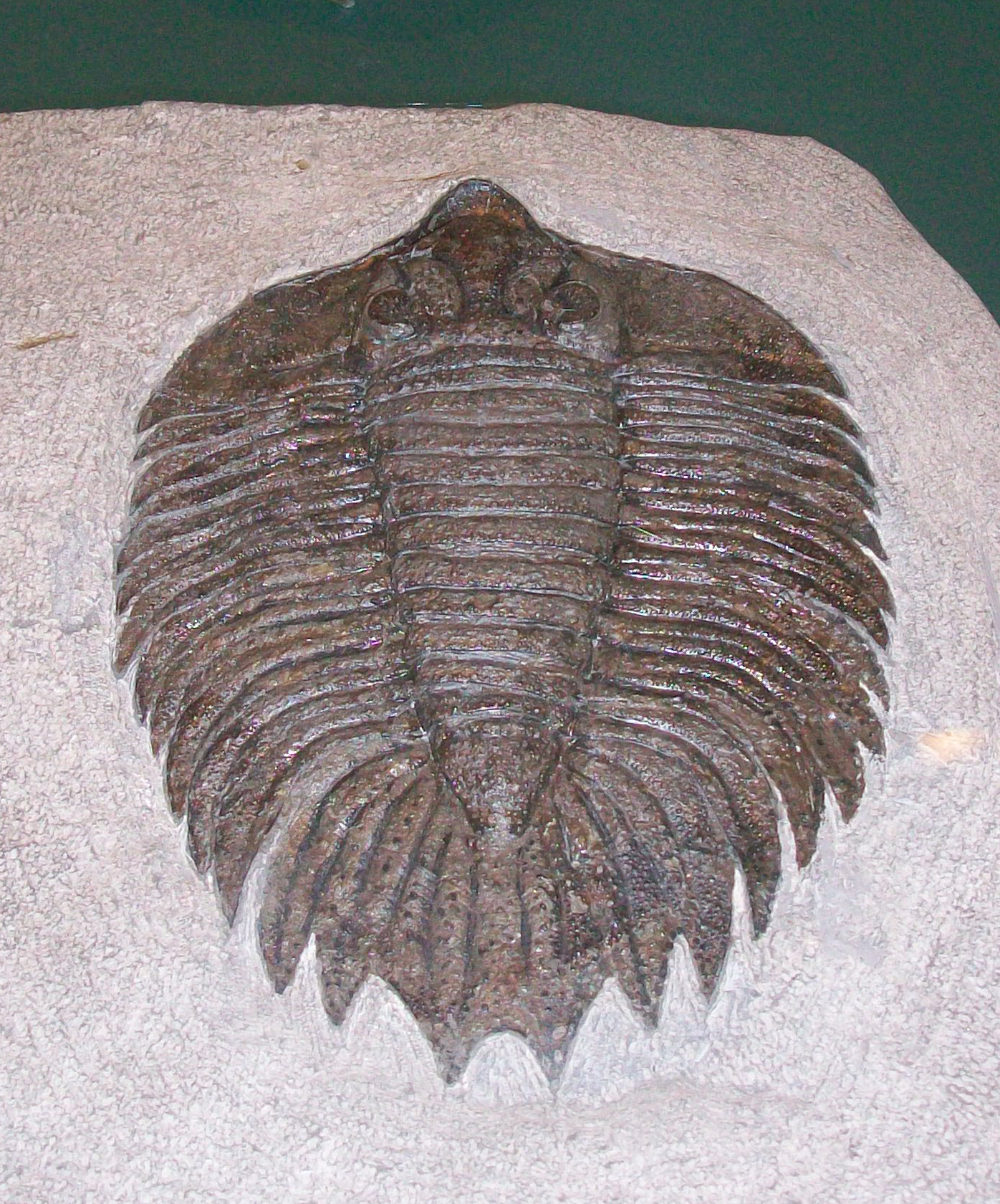
- Fossil of the Silurian trilobite Arctinurus
  †Arctinurus
- †Arctomeristina
- †Arisaigia
- †Arrectocrinus
  - †Arrectocrinus iowensis
- †Arthroxylon
- †Asphaltinella
- †Asterophyllites
  - †Asterophyllites multifolia
- †Asthenophyllum
- †Astraeospongium
- †Astreptodictya
- †Astrocystites
  - †Astrocystites ottawaensis – tentative report
- †Atelodictyon
  - †Atelodictyon masoncityense – type locality for species
- †Athyris
  - †Athyris cedarensis
  - †Athyris crassicardinalis
  - †Athyris fultonensis – or unidentified comparable form
  - †Athyris simplex
  - †Athyris spiriferiodes
  - †Athyris vitatta
  - †Athyris vittata
  - †Athyris zonulata
- †Atribonium
  - †Atribonium nora
  - †Atribonium paupera
  - †Atribonium prolifica
  - †Atribonium subovata
  - †Atribonium swallovi
- †Atrypa
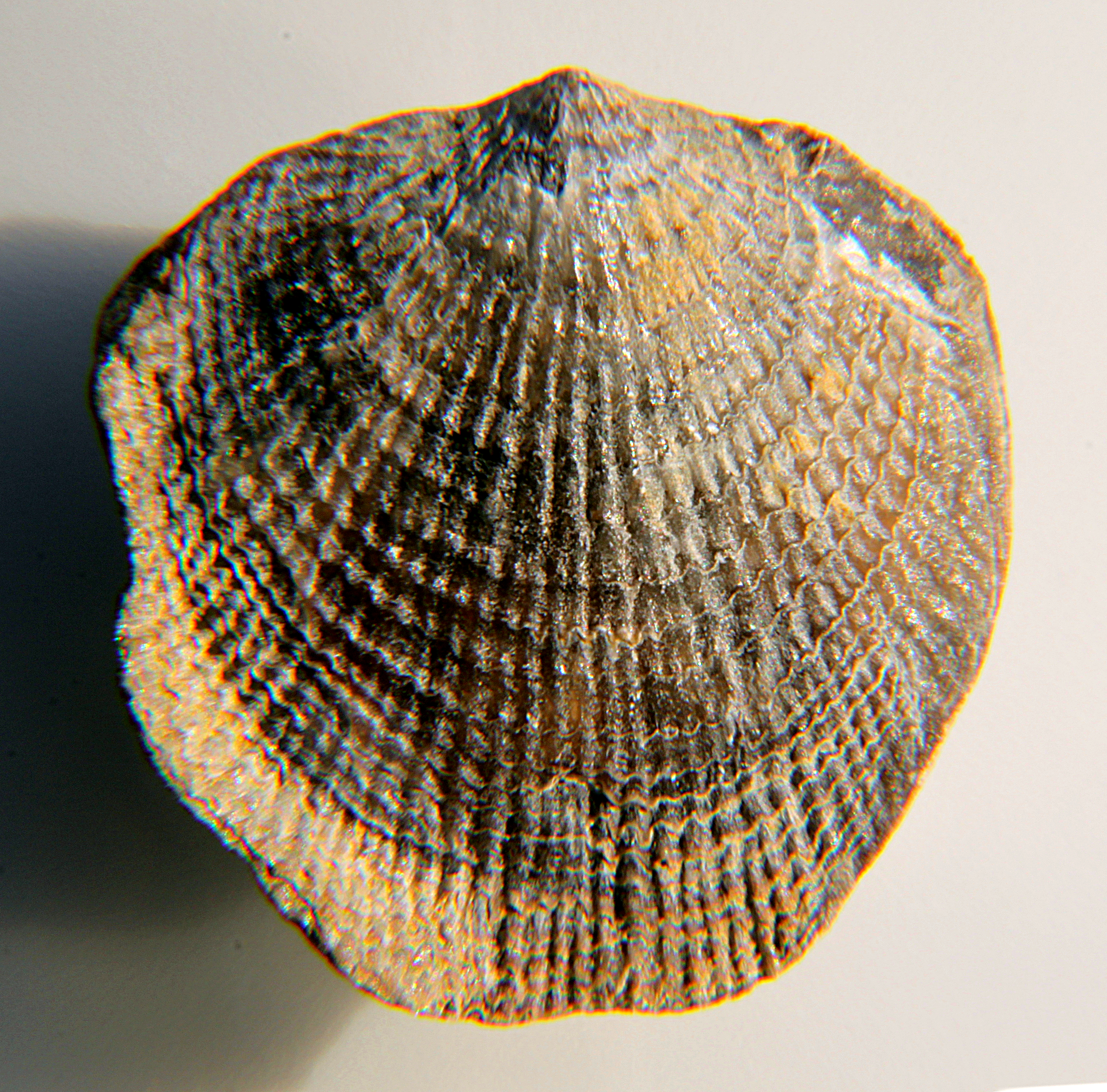
  - Fossilized shell of the Silurian-Late Devonian brachiopod Atrypa reticularis
    †Atrypa reticularis
  - †Atrypa reticularus
- †Atryparia
  - †Atryparia varicostata
- †Atrypoidea
- †Aulacella
- †Aulocopella
  - †Aulocopella dactylos – type locality for species
  - †Aulocopella probolos – type locality for species
  - †Aulocopella scelidos – type locality for species
- †Aviculopecten
  - †Aviculopecten marbuti – or unidentified comparable form

== B ==
- Bairdia
- †Bairdiocypris
  - †Bairdiocypris granti
- †Bairdocypris
  - †Bairdocypris granti
- †Basseleratia
  - †Basseleratia typa
- †Bassleratia
  - †Bassleratia typa
- †Batostomella
- †Baylea
  - †Baylea trifibra – type locality for species
- †Beecheria
  - †Beecheria chouteauensis
- †Belemnocrinus
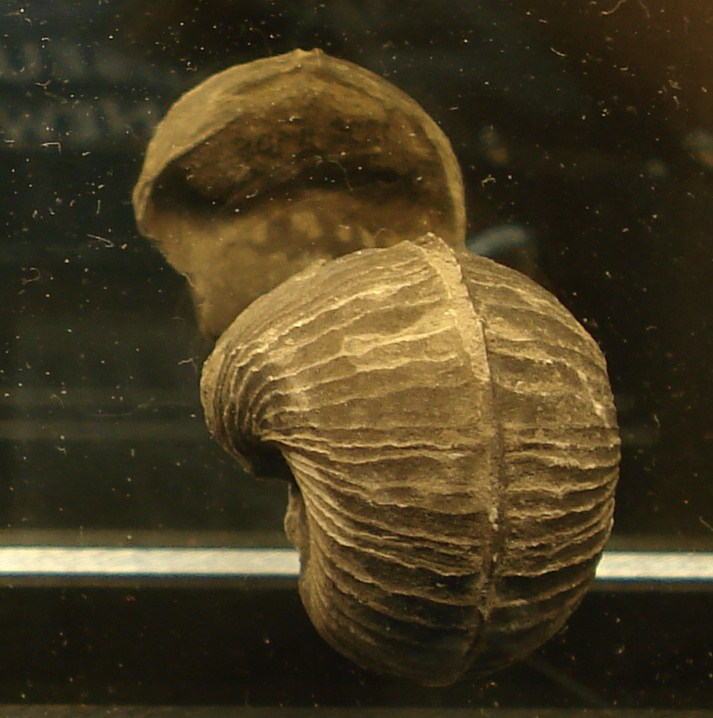
- Fossilized shell of the Silurian-Early Triassic mollusc Bellerophon
  †Bellerophon
  - †Bellerophon blairi
  - †Bellerophon panneus
  - †Bellerophon patersoni
  - †Bellerophon vinculatus
- †Bellornatia
  - †Bellornatia tricollis
- †Belodina
  - †Belodina compressa
- †Beloitoceras – tentative report
  - †Beloitoceras discrepana
- †Bembexia
  - †Bembexia minima
- †Bensbergia
  - †Bensbergia pulchra – type locality for species
- †Beyrichia
  - †Beyrichia irregularis
- †Bighornia
- †Blothrocrinus
- †Bobbodus
  - †Bobbodus schaefferi
- †Bolicrinus
  - †Bolicrinus deflatus
  - †Bolicrinus globosus
- †Bollia
  - †Bollia regularis
  - †Bollia ruthae
  - †Bollia subaequata
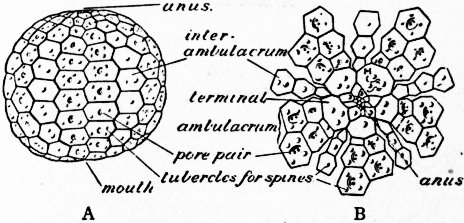
- Reconstructive diagram (left) of a fossil (right) of the Ordovician sea urchin Bothriocidaris. The short spines which were attached to the tubercles are not drawn.
  †Bothriocidaris
  - †Bothriocidaris maquoketensis
- †Botryocrinus
  - †Botryocrinus thomasi – type locality for species
- †Brachythyris
  - †Brachythyris burlingtonensis – or unidentified comparable form
  - †Brachythyris chouteauensis
  - †Brachythyris peculiaris
- †Brachytomaria
  - †Brachytomaria semele
- †Breviphillipsia
- †Brockocystis
  - †Brockocystis nodosaria
- †Bromidella
  - †Bromidella depressa
  - †Bromidella rhomboides
- †Bryantodina
  - †Bryantodina typicalis
- †Bucanella
  - †Bucanella conradi
- †Bucanopsis
  - †Bucanopsis lirata
- †Bullatekka
  - †Bullatekka granilabiatus
- †Bullatella
  - †Bullatella granilabiatus
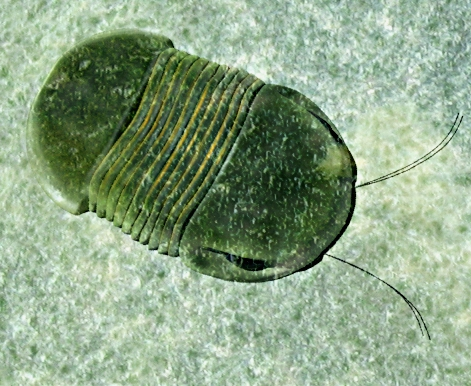
- Life restoration of the Early Ordovician-Silurian trilobite Bumastus
  †Bumastus
- †Buranella
- †Buxtonia – tentative report
- †Byrsolopsina
  - †Byrsolopsina centipunctata
  - †Byrsolopsina normella
  - †Byrsolopsina ovata
  - †Byrsolopsina planilateralis
- Bythocypris
  - †Bythocypris curta
  - †Bythocypris furnishi

== C ==
- †Caenanoplia
  - †Caenanoplia logani
- †Calamocarpon
  - †Calamocarpon insignis
- †Calceocrinus
  - †Calceocrinus levorsoni
- †Calcisphaera
  - †Calcisphaera laevis
- †Calliocrinus
  - †Calliocrinus longispinus
- †Callocrinus
  - †Callocrinus longispinus
- †Callocystites
- †Calvinaria
  - †Calvinaria ambigua
  - †Calvinaria bransoni
- †Calvustrigis – tentative report
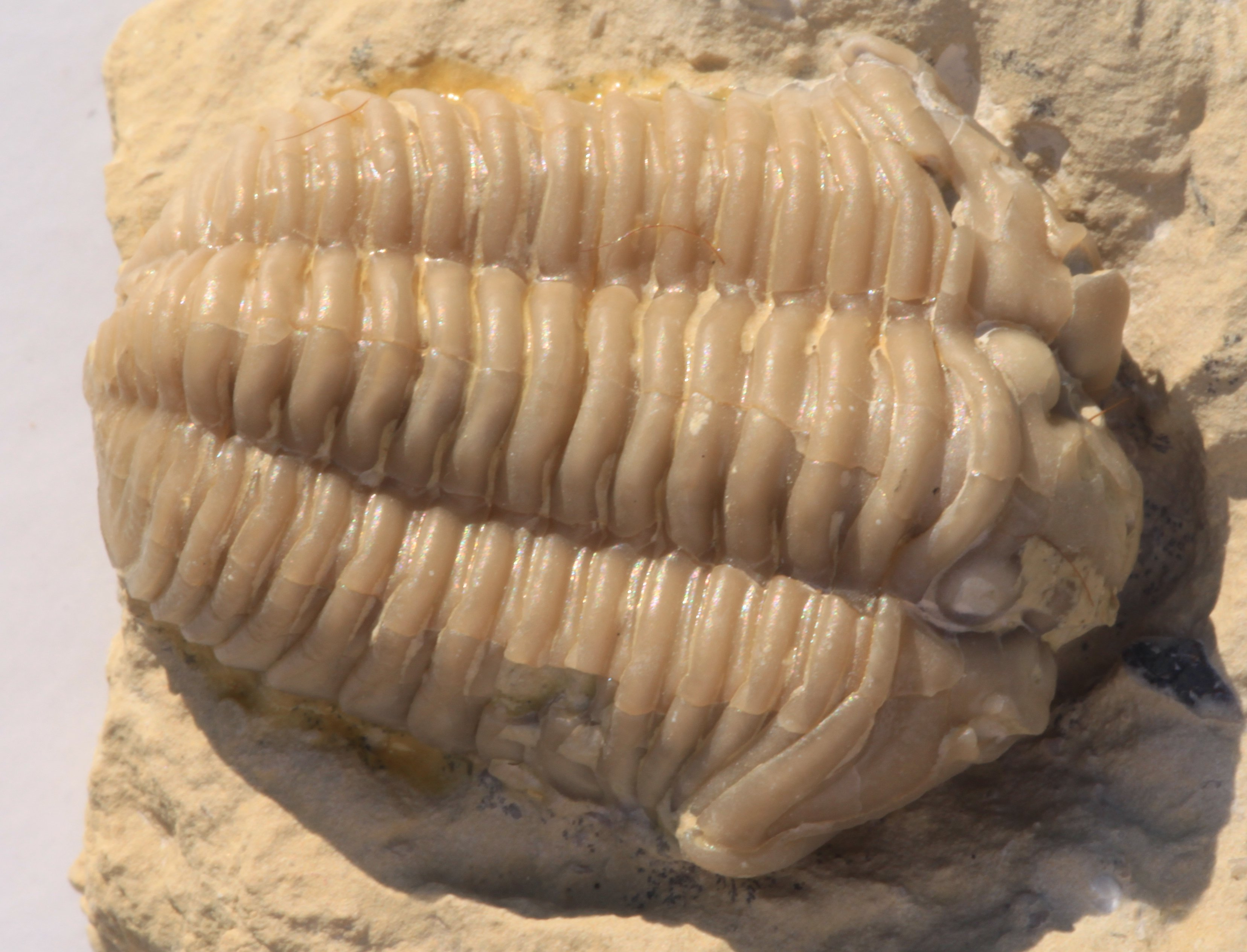
- Fossil of the Early Ordovician-Early Devonian trilobite Calymene
  †Calymene
- †Camarophorella
  - †Camarophorella lenticularis
- †Camarotoechia
  - †Camarotoechia chemungensis
  - †Camarotoechia chouteauensis
  - †Camarotoechia crassiplicata
  - †Camarotoechia perplexa
  - †Camarotoechia quadricostatum
  - †Camarotoechia saxatilis
  - †Camarotoechia saxatillis
  - †Camarotoechia tuta
- †Camerella
- †Carabocrinus
  - †Carabocrinus radiatus
  - †Carabocrinus slocomi
- †Cardiola
  - †Cardiola lyoni
- †Carinatrypa
  - †Carinatrypa dysmorphstrota
- †Cariniferella
  - †Cariniferella iowensis
- †Carpocrinus
  - †Carpocrinus bodei
- †Caryocrinites
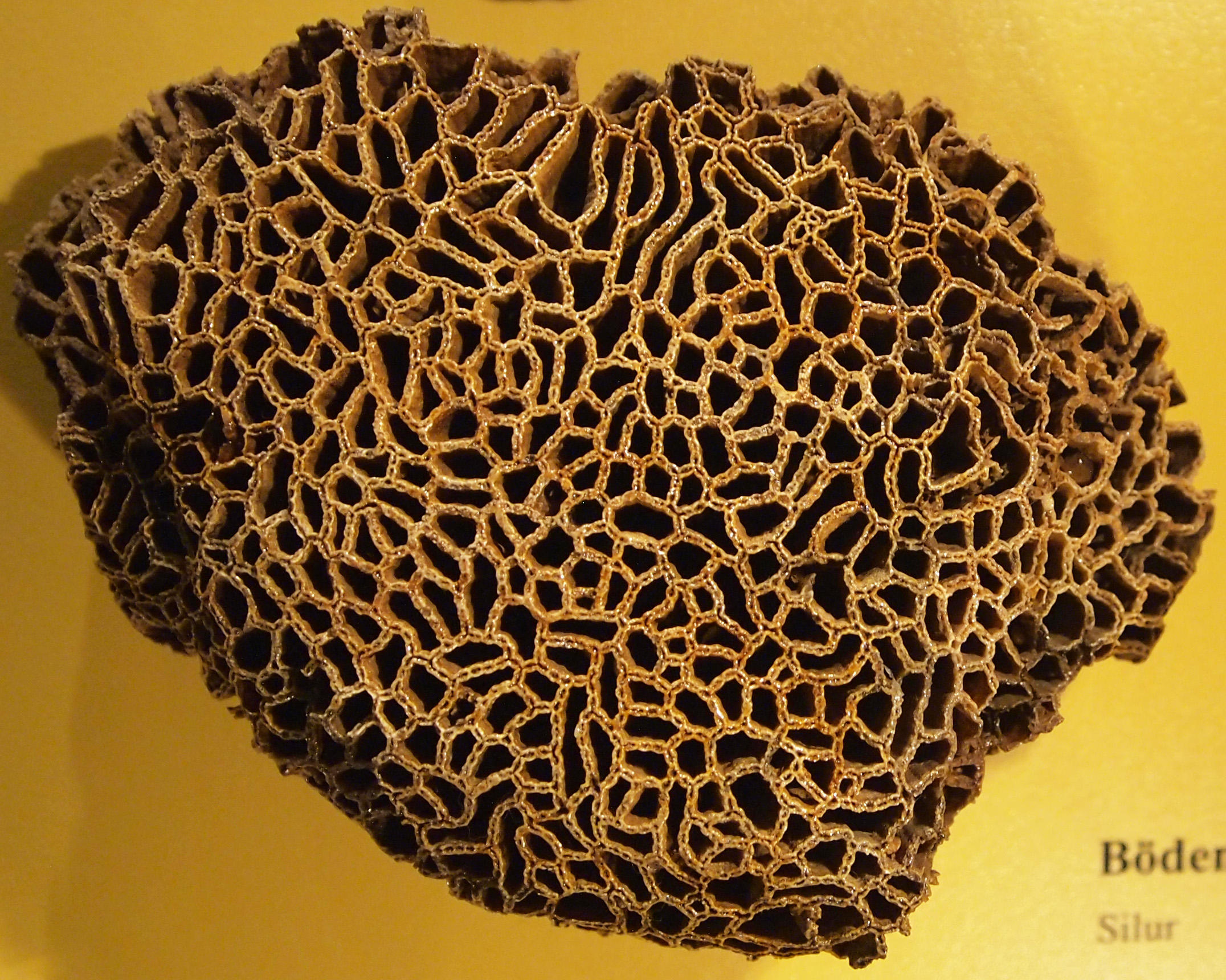
- Fossil of the Ordovician-Silurian tabulate coral Catenipora
  †Catenipora
- †Ceratocephala
- †Ceratopsis
  - †Ceratopsis humilinoda
  - †Ceratopsis quadrifida
  - †Ceratopsis trilobis
- †Ceraurus
- †Cerithioides
  - †Cerithioides judiae
- †Characterophyllum
  - †Characterophyllum nanum
- †Charactoceras
- †Charactophyllum
  - †Charactophyllum nanum
- †Charionella
  - †Charionella nortoni
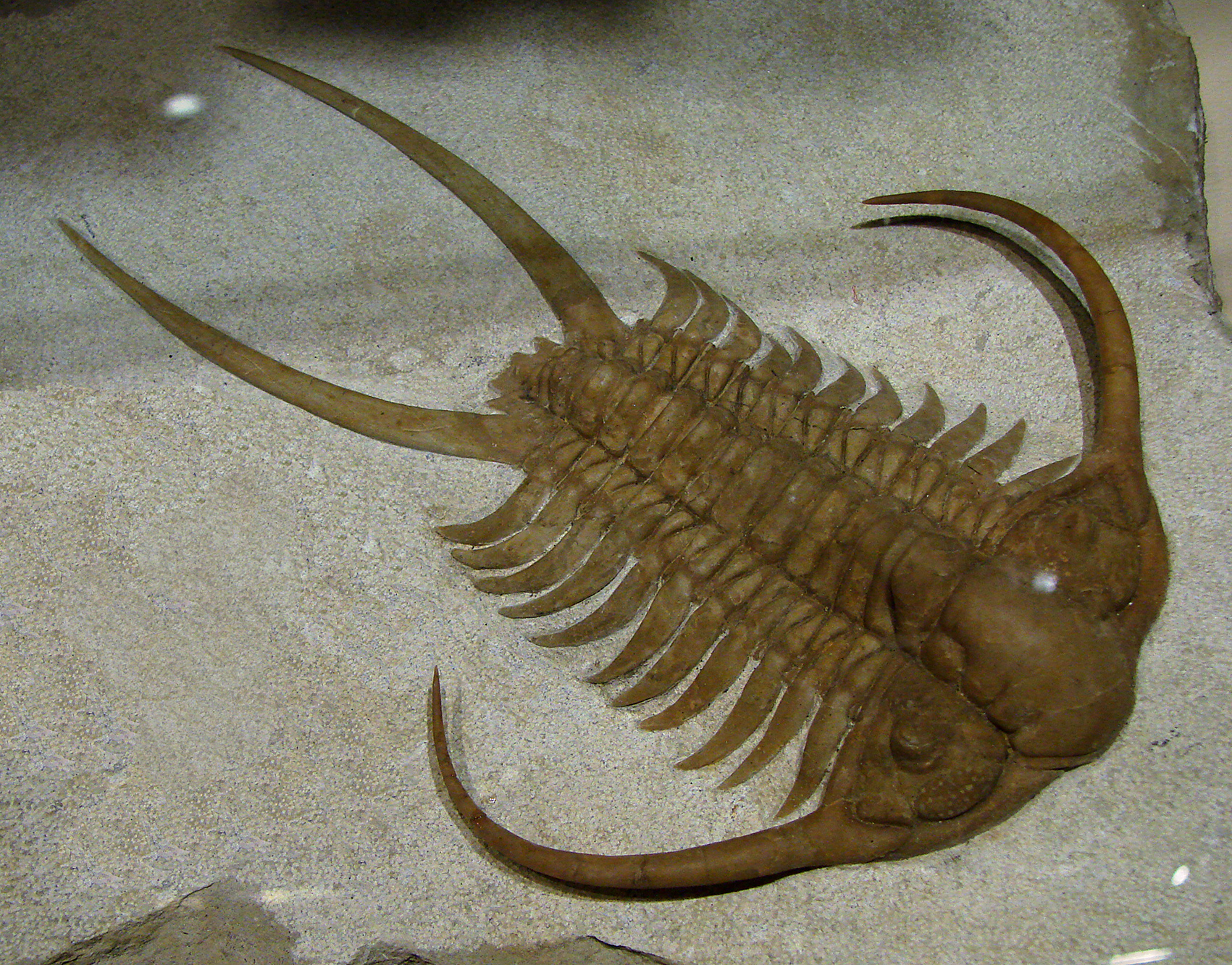
- Fossil of the Cambrian-Middle Devonian trilobite Cheirurus
  †Cheirurus
- †Chomatodus
  - †Chomatodus inconstans
- †Chonetes
  - †Chonetes glenparkensis
  - †Chonetes illinoisensis
  - †Chonetes logani
  - †Chonetes multicosta
  - †Chonetes multicostata
  - †Chonetes ornatus
- †Chonetina
- †Chonetinella
- †Chonetipustula
  - †Chonetipustula concentrica
- †Chonopectus
  - †Chonopectus fischeri
- †Chonophyllum
- †Clathrocoilona
  - †Clathrocoilona involuta – type locality for species
- †Clathrodictyon
- †Cleiocrinus
  - †Cleiocrinus regius
- †Cleiothyridina
  - †Cleiothyridina crassicardinalis – or unidentified related form
  - †Cleiothyridina glenparkensis – or unidentified comparable form
  - †Cleiothyridina incrassata – or unidentified comparable form
  - †Cleiothyridina sublamellosa
- †Climacoconus
  - †Climacoconus pumilus
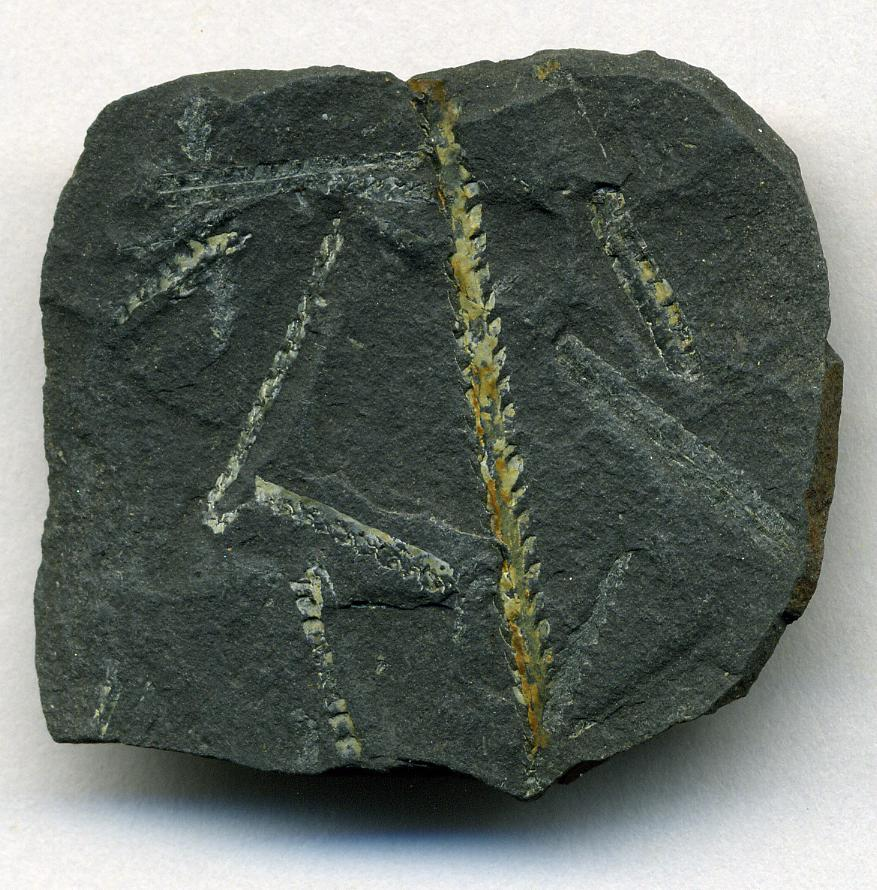
- Assemblage of fossils of the Cambrian graptolite Climacograptus
  †Climacograptus
  - †Climacograptus pumilis
  - †Climacograptus typicalis
- †Clinolithes
- †Clinopistha
- †Clintonella – tentative report
- †Clorinda
- †Cochliodus
  - †Cochliodus occidentalis
- †Coelospira
- †Coeloterorhynchus
  - †Coeloterorhynchus schucherti
  - †Coeloterorhynchus subacuminata
  - †Coeloterorhynchus subacuminatus
- †Coenites
- †Composita
  - †Composita humilis – tentative report
  - †Composita immatura – or unidentified comparable form
  - †Composita trinuclea
- †Compsocrinus
- †Concavicaris
  - †Concavicaris sinuata – or unidentified comparable form
- †Conocardium
- †Conotreta
- †Conularia
- †Coolinia
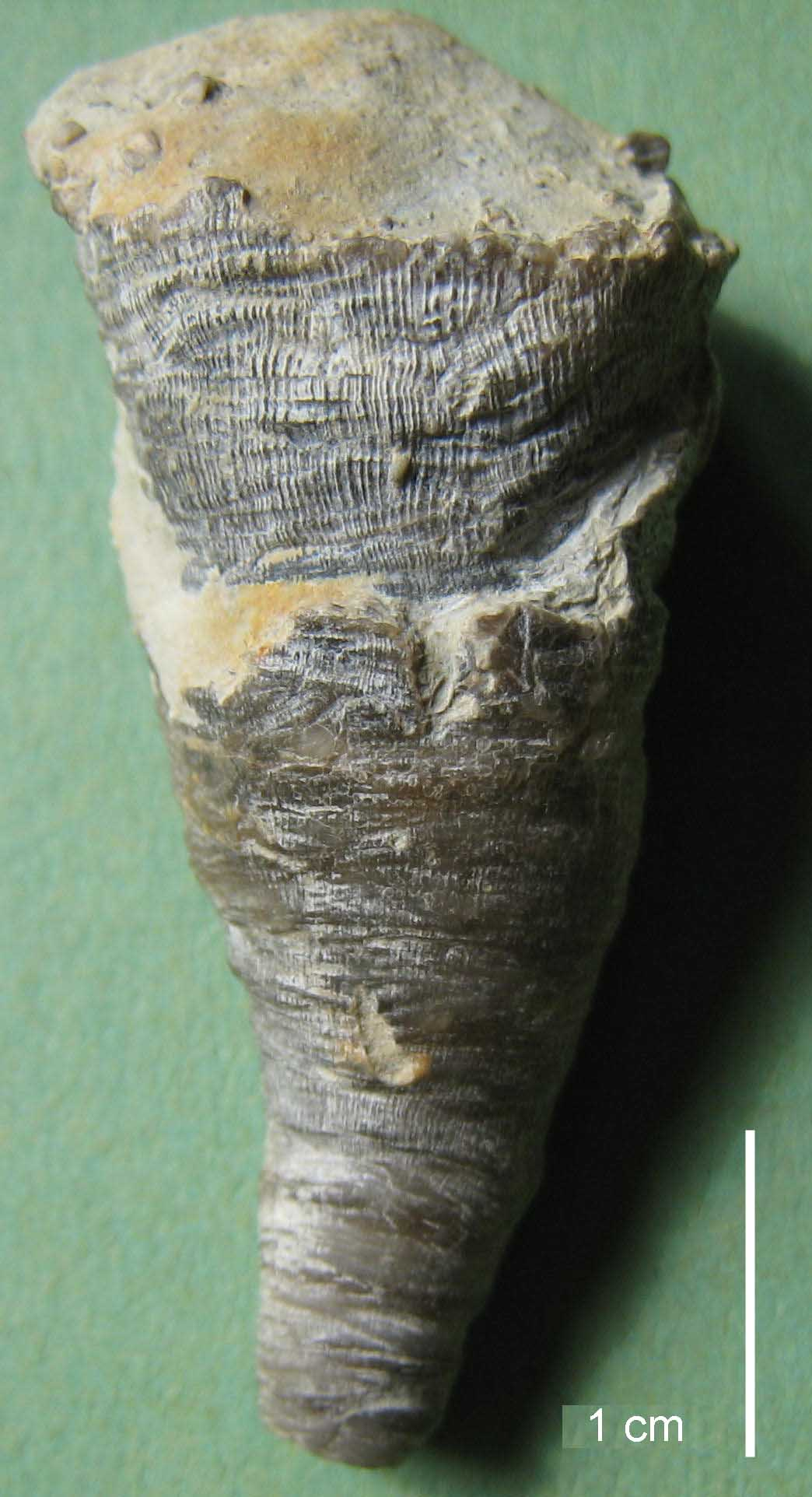
- Fossil of the Middle Ordovician-Carboniferous horn coral Cornulites
  †Cornulites
- †Costistricklandia
  - †Costistricklandia castellana
  - †Costistricklandia multilirata
- †Cotylacrina
  - †Cotylacrina sandra
- †Cranaena
  - †Cranaena amana
  - †Cranaena arcuosa
  - †Cranaena calvini
  - †Cranaena depressa
  - †Cranaena elia
  - †Cranaena famelica
  - †Cranaena inflata
  - †Cranaena infrequens
  - †Cranaena iowensis
  - †Cranaena jacunda
  - †Cranaena lata
  - †Cranaena littleonensis
  - †Cranaena littletonensis
  - †Cranaena maculata
  - †Cranaena marsii
  - †Cranaena micula
  - †Cranaena navicella
  - †Cranaena occidentalis
  - †Cranaena pachytesta
  - †Cranaena parvirostra
  - †Cranaena rhomboidialis
  - †Cranaena rockfordensis
  - †Cranaena romingeri
  - †Cranaena seminula
  - †Cranaena subcylindrica
  - †Cranaena subglobosa
  - †Cranaena subglossa
  - †Cranaena subgobulosa
  - †Cranaena subouata
  - †Cranaena subovata
  - †Cranaena thomasi
- †Cranaenella
- †Crania
  - †Crania famelica
- †Crassiproetus
  - †Crassiproetus arietinus
  - †Crassiproetus bumastoides
  - †Crassiproetus occidens
  - †Crassiproetus searighti
- †Cremacrinus
  - †Cremacrinus gerki
  - †Cremacrinus guttenbergensis
  - †Cremacrinus punctatus – or unidentified related form
  - †Cremacrinus type locality for species – informal
- †Cribanocrinus
- †Crotalocrinintes
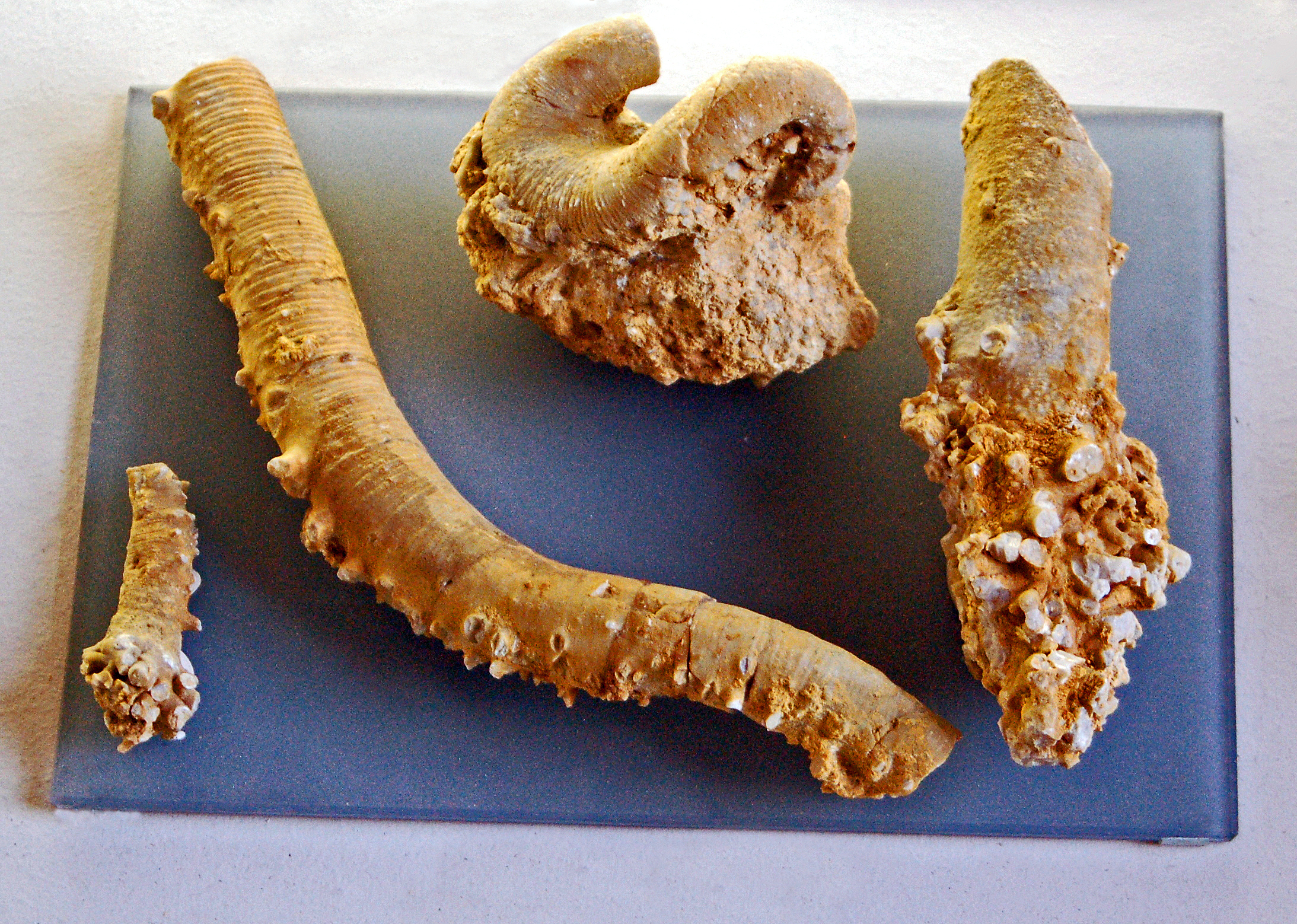
- Fossilized stem segments of the Silurian crinoid ("sea lily") Crotalocrinites
  †Crotalocrinites
- †Crurithyris
- †Cryptophyllus
  - †Cryptophyllus oboloides
  - †Cryptophyllus sulcatus
- †Ctenobolbina
  - †Ctenobolbina emaciata
  - †Ctenobolbina maquoketensis
- †Ctenodonta
  - †Ctenodonta anatina
  - †Ctenodonta calvini
- †Cupularostrum
  - †Cupularostrum contracta
  - †Cupularostrum saxatilis
  - †Cupularostrum saxatillis
- †Cupulocorona
- †Cupulocrinus
  - †Cupulocrinus angustatus
  - †Cupulocrinus conjugans – or unidentified related form
  - †Cupulocrinus crossmani
  - †Cupulocrinus latibrachiatus – or unidentified related form
- †Curtognathus
- †Cusacrinus
- †Cyathaxonia
  - †Cyathaxonia arcuatus
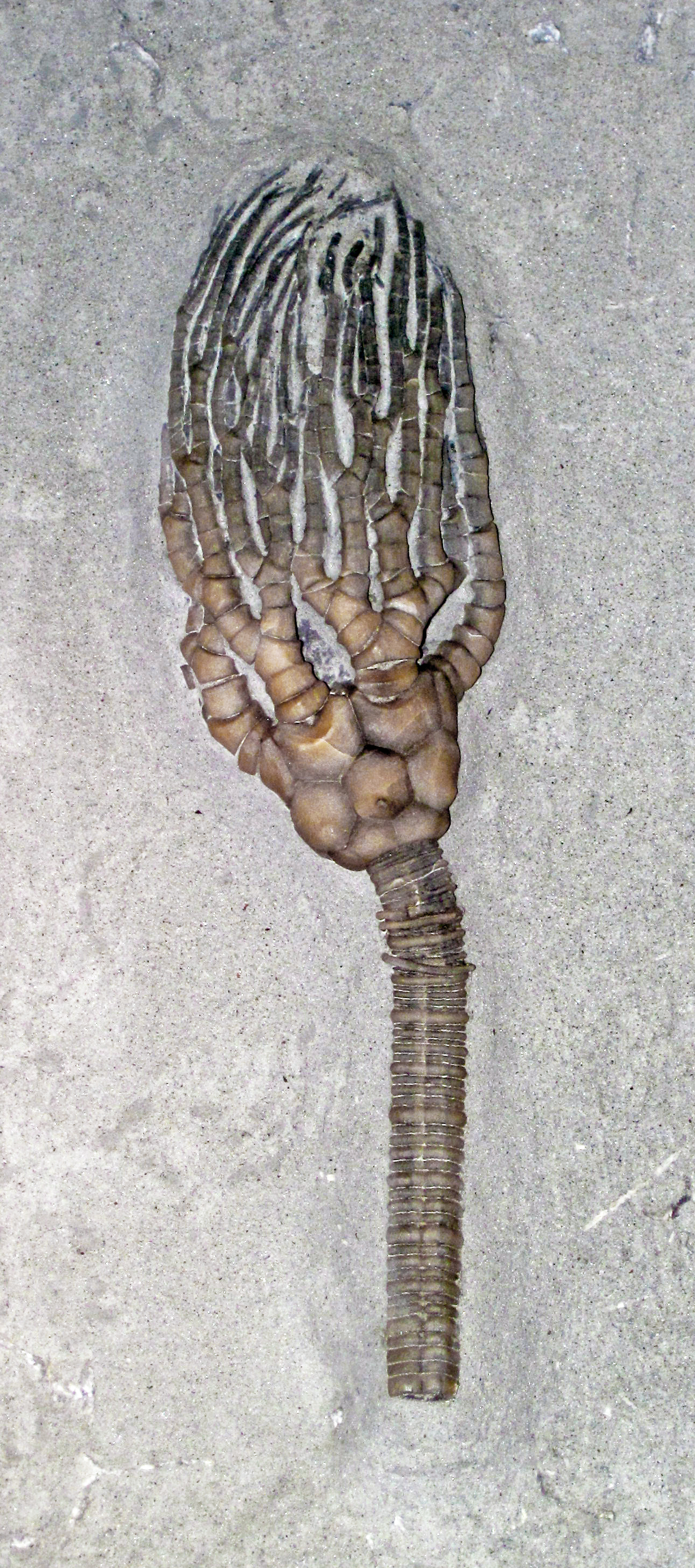
- Fossilized calyx and partial stem of the Silurian-Permian crinoid ("sea lily") Cyathocrinites
  †Cyathocrinites
- †Cyathocrintes
  - †Cyathocrintes striatissimus – or unidentified comparable form
- †Cyathophyllum
- †Cyclocrinites
  - †Cyclocrinites dactilioides
  - †Cyclocrinites dactioloides
- †Cyclocystoides
- †Cyclonema
  - †Cyclonema bilix
  - †Cyclonema minuta
- †Cyclora
- †Cynopodius
- †Cyphaspis
- †Cypricardella
- †Cypricardinia
  - †Cypricardinia sulcifera
- †Cyrtia
  - †Cyrtia exporrecta
- †Cyrtina
  - †Cyrtina inulta
  - †Cyrtina iowaensis
  - †Cyrtina triquetra
  - †Cyrtina umbonata
- †Cyrtodonta
- †Cyrtolites
- †Cyrtospira
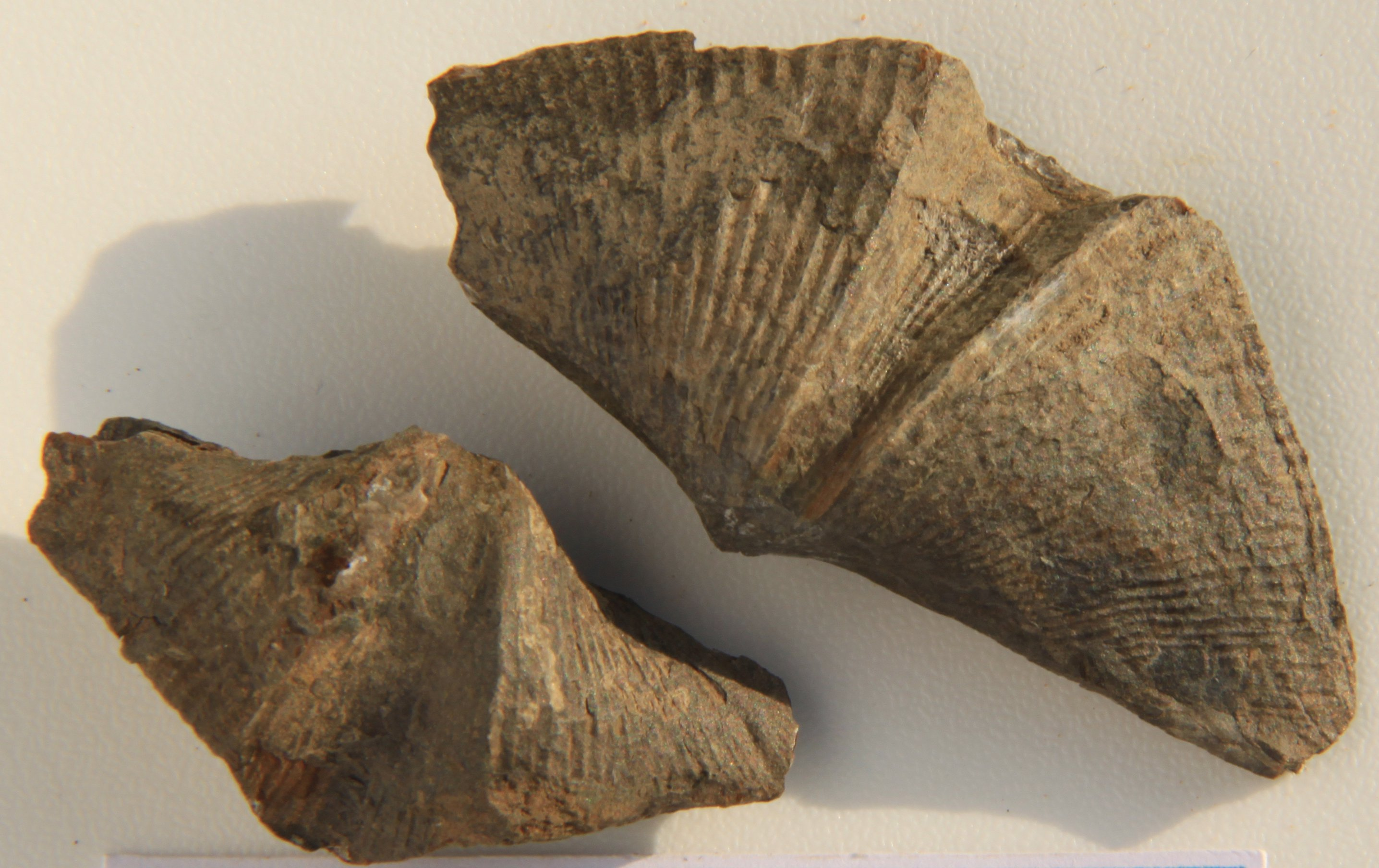
- Fossilized shells of the Middle-Late Devonian brachiopod Cyrtospirifer
  †Cyrtospirifer
  - †Cyrtospirifer disjunctus
  - †Cyrtospirifer whitneyi
- †Cystiphyllum
  - †Cystiphyllum mundulum
- †Cystodictya
- †Cytocrinus

== D ==
- †Dalejina
- †Dalmanella
  - †Dalmanella edgewoodensis – or unidentified comparable form
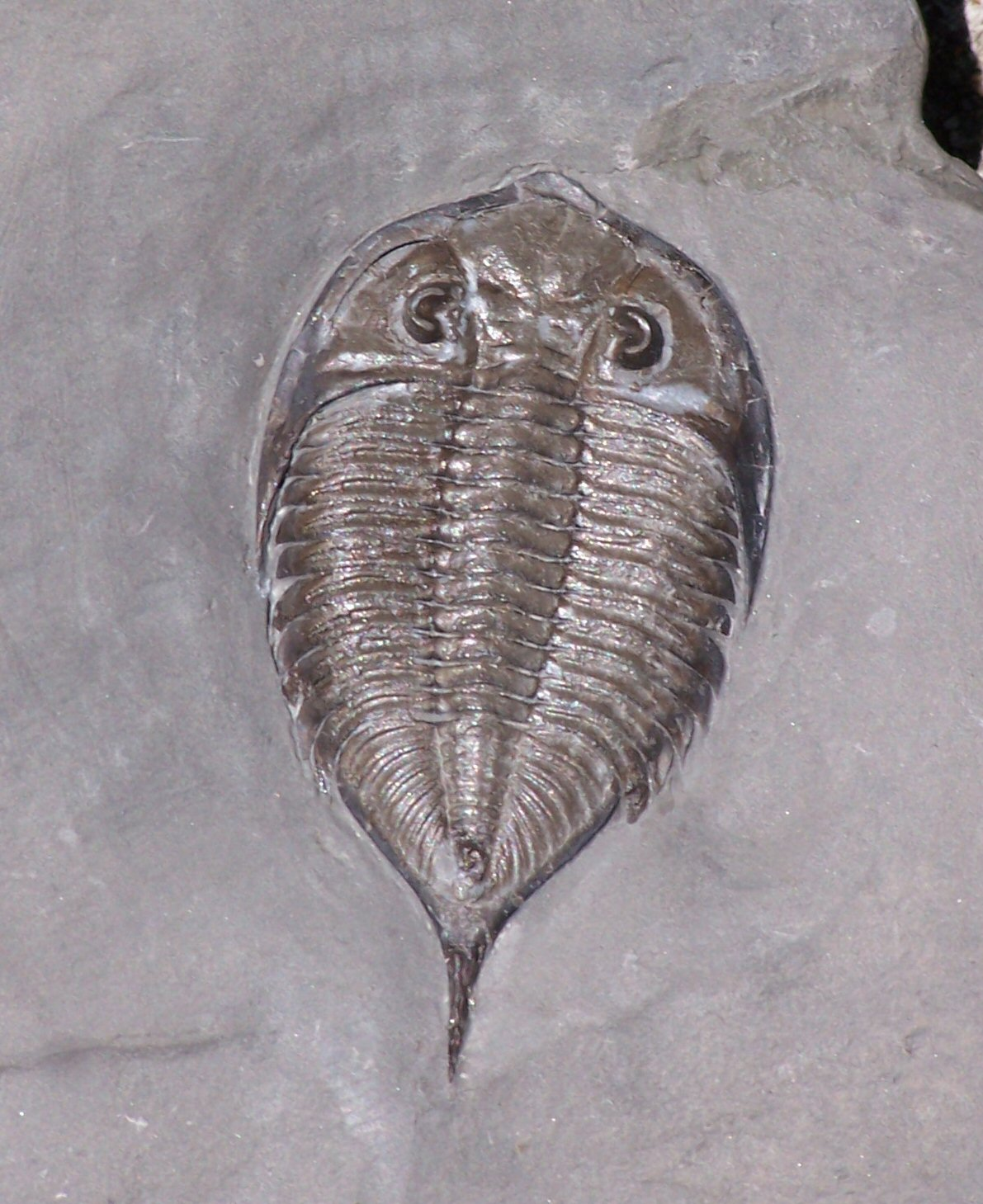
- Fossil of the Late Ordovician-Middle Devonian trilobite Dalmanites
  †Dalmanites
- †Dapsilodus
  - †Dapsilodus mutatus
- †Dawsonoceras
- †Decadocrinus
  - †Decadocrinus crassidactylus – type locality for species
  - †Decadocrinus pachydactylus – type locality for species
  - †Decadocrinus spinulifer – type locality for species
- †Decaschisma
- †Dechenella
  - †Dechenella haldemani – or unidentified comparable form
  - †Dechenella nortoni
  - †Dechenella prouti
  - †Dechenella rowi – or unidentified comparable form
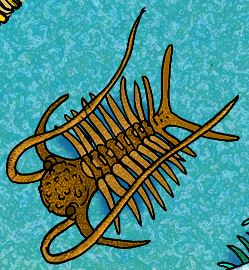
- Life restoration of two species of the Silurian trilobite Deiphon
  †Deiphon
- †Delocrinus
  - †Delocrinus vulgatus
- †Deltaherpeton – type locality for genus
  - †Deltaherpeton hiemstrae – type locality for species
- †Delthyris – tentative report
- †Deltodus
  - †Deltodus spatulatus
- †Dendrocrinus
  - †Dendrocrinus casei
  - †Dendrocrinus curvijunctus – or unidentified related form
  - †Dendrocrinus oswegoensis
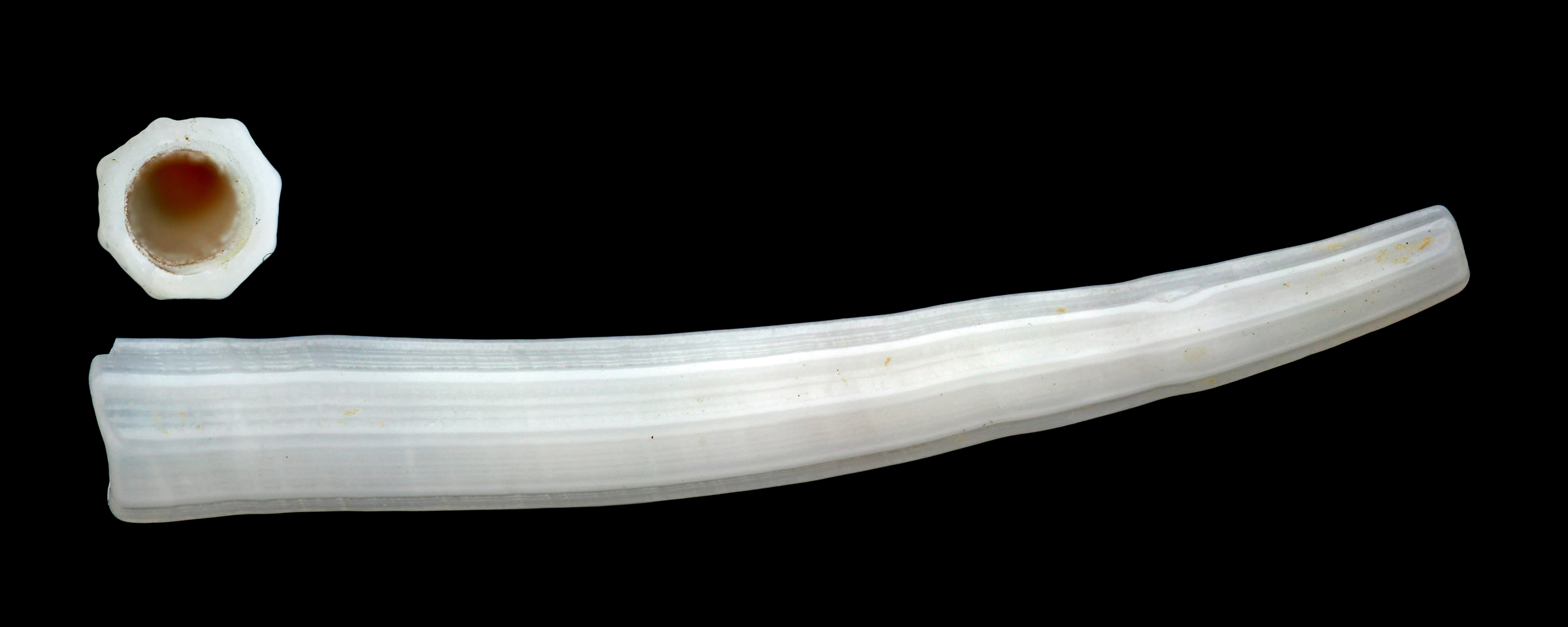
- Shell of a Dentalium tusk shell
  †Dentalium
  - †Dentalium grandaevum
- †Derbyia
- †Desquamatia
  - †Desquamatia brandonensis
  - †Desquamatia independensis
  - †Desquamatia randalia
  - †Desquamatia rotunda
  - †Desquamatia rusica
  - †Desquamatia scutiformis
  - †Desquamatia waterlooensis
- †Devonatrypa
  - †Devonatrypa brandonensis
  - †Devonatrypa pronis
  - †Devonatrypa trowbridgei
  - †Devonatrypa waterlooensis
- †Devonochonetes
  - †Devonochonetes calivini
- †Devonoproductus
  - †Devonoproductus reticulocostus
  - †Devonoproductus vulgaris
  - †Devonoproductus walcotti
- †Diamphidiocystis
- †Diceromyonia
- †Dichacaenia
  - †Dichacaenia harberti
- †Dichocrinus
- †Dicoelosia
- †Dicranella
  - †Dicranella bicornis
  - †Dicranella marginata
  - †Dicranella simplex
  - †Dicranella spinosa
  - †Dicranella typa
- †Dicranopeltis
- †Dictyoclostus
- †Dictyotomaria
  - †Dictyotomaria quasicapillaria – type locality for species
- †Dielasma
  - †Dielasma burlingtonensis
  - †Dielasma chouteauensis
  - †Dielasma formosum
- †Dimerocrinites
  - †Dimerocrinites hopkintonensis
  - †Dimerocrinites pentangularis
  - †Dimerocrinites sculptus
- †Dinobolus
- †Dinolobus
- †Dinorthis
- †Diopatraites
- †Diphyphyllum
- †Diploblastus
  - †Diploblastus glaber
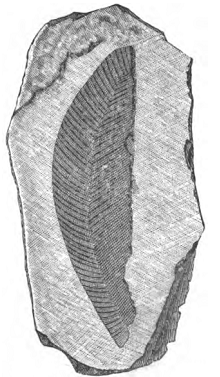
- Cambrian graptolite Diplograptus
  †Diplograptus
  - †Diplograptus modestus – or unidentified comparable form
- †Diplophyllum
- †Diplosphaerina
  - †Diplosphaerina inaequalis
- †Discosorus
- †Disphyllum
  - †Disphyllum conjugans – type locality for species
  - †Disphyllum dispassum
  - †Disphyllum floydense
  - †Disphyllum iowensis – type locality for species
  - †Disphyllum tubiforme
- †Dolerorthis
- †Donaldina – tentative report
- †Dorycrinus
  - †Dorycrinus gouldi
  - †Dorycrinus mississippiensis
- †Douvillina
  - †Douvillina arcuata
  - †Douvillina cayuta
  - †Douvillina delicata
  - †Douvillina distans
  - †Douvillina maxima
  - †Douvillina navicula
  - †Douvillina oxycostratum
  - †Douvillina variabilis
- †Douvillinaria
  - †Douvillinaria delicata
  - †Douvillinaria perversa
  - †Douvillinaria variabilis
  - †Douvillinaria variablis
- †Drepanoistodus
  - †Drepanoistodus suberectus
- †Dudleyaspis
- †Dvorakia
  - †Dvorakia chattertoni – type locality for species

== E ==
- †Earlandia
- †Ecclimadictyon
  - †Ecclimadictyon fastigiatum
- †Echinocoelia
  - †Echinocoelia halli
- †Echinoconchus
- †Ectenocrinus
  - †Ectenocrinus raymondi
  - †Ectenocrinus simplex
- †Ectodemites
  - †Ectodemites primus
- †Ectogrammysia
  - †Ectogrammysia hannibalensis
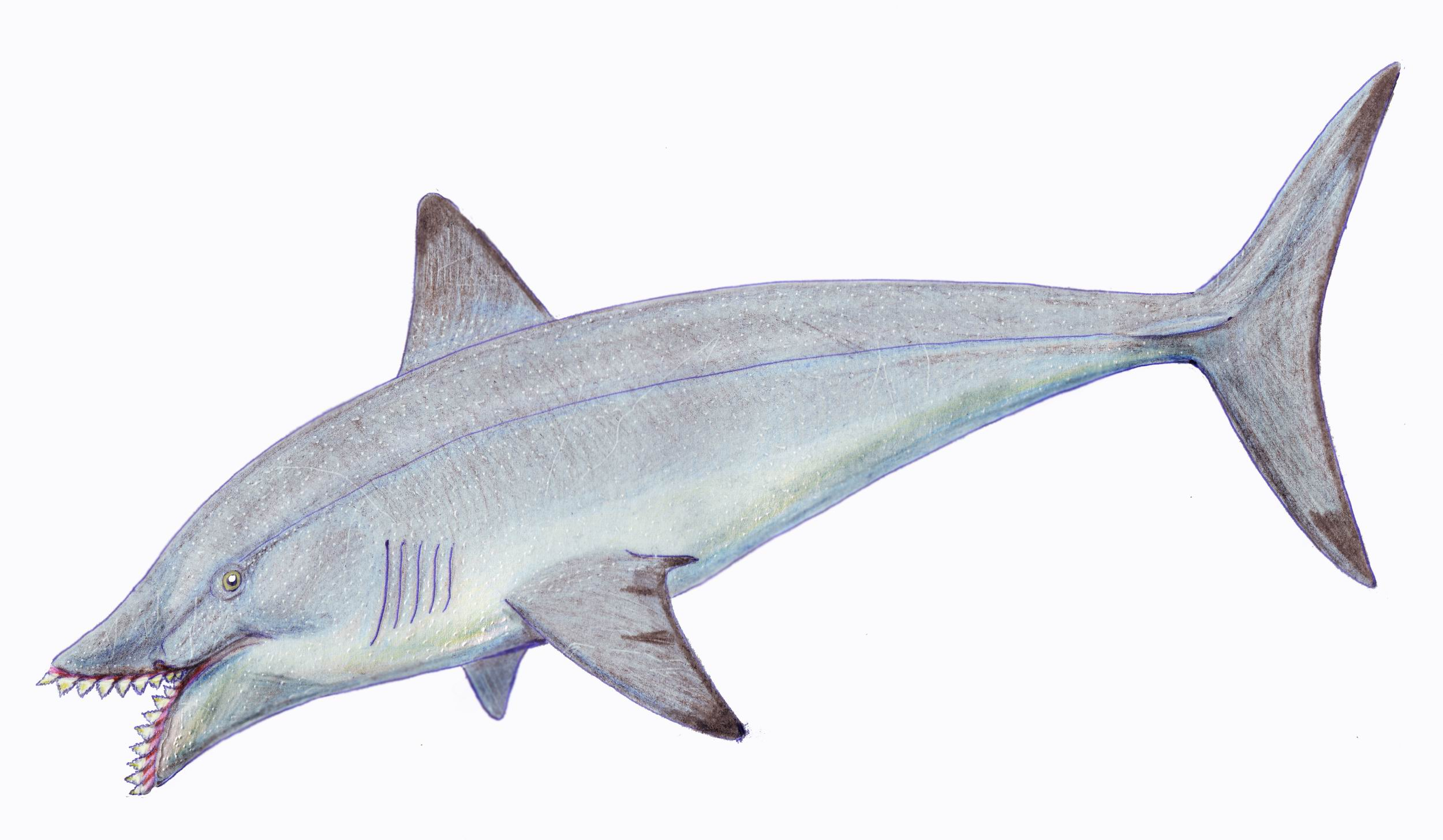
- Life restoration of the Late Devonian-Carboniferous Chimaera relative Edestus
  †Edestus
  - †Edestus crenulata
  - †Edestus mirus – type locality for species
- †Edmondia
  - †Edmondia jejunus
- †Eldredgeops
  - †Eldredgeops rana
- †Eleutherokomma
  - †Eleutherokomma jasperensis
- †Elita
  - †Elita diversa
  - †Elita inconsueta
  - †Elita johnsonensis
  - †Elita minor
  - †Elita subundifera
  - †Elita urbana
- †Ellesmeria
  - †Ellesmeria scobeyi
- †Ellesmeroceras
  - †Ellesmeroceras luthei
  - †Ellesmeroceras thomasi
- †Emanuella
  - †Emanuella ii – report made of unidentified related form or using admittedly obsolete nomenclature
  - †Emanuella meristoides
  - †Emanuella sublineata
- †Emphereaster
  - †Emphereaster missouriensis
- †Encrinurus
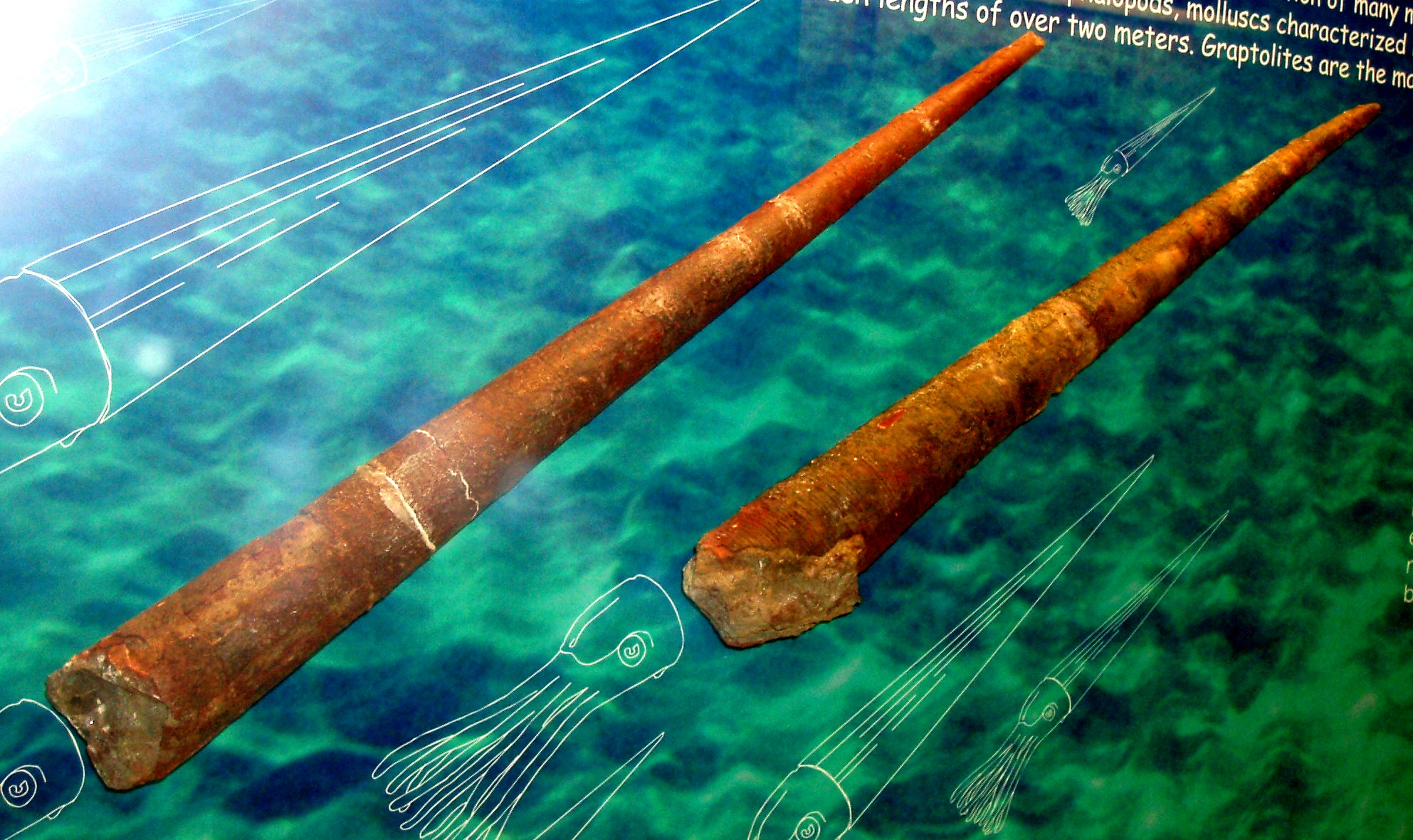
- Fossilized shells and restored appearances of the Middle-Late Ordovician nautiloid cephalopod Endoceras
  †Endoceras
- †Endostaffella
  - †Endostaffella discoidea
- †Endothyra
  - †Endothyra obsoleta – tentative report
- †Endothyranella
- †Enoploura
  - †Enoploura wetherbyi
- †Enteletes
- †Entelophyllum
- Eocaudina
  - †Eocaudina septaforaminalis – type locality for species
- †Eochonetes
  - †Eochonetes aspera
  - †Eochonetes dignata – type locality for species
  - †Eochonetes recedens
- †Eodictyonella
- †Eolissochonetes
- †Eomartiniopsis
  - †Eomartiniopsis rostrata
- †Eoparisocrinus
  - †Eoparisocrinus crossmani
- †Eophacops
- †Eoplectodonta
- †Eoschmidtella
  - †Eoschmidtella umbonata
- †Eospirifer
  - †Eospirifer radiatus
- †Eospirigerina
  - †Eospirigerina putilla – or unidentified comparable form
- †Eostrophalosia
  - †Eostrophalosia independensis
  - †Eostrophalosia inexpectans
  - †Eostrophalosia rockfordensis
- †Eosyringothyris
  - †Eosyringothyris aspera
  - †Eosyringothyris occidentalis
  - †Eosyringothyris thomasi
  - †Eosyringothyris triangularis
- †Ephippiorthoceras
- †Eridoconcha
  - †Eridoconcha gibbera
  - †Eridoconcha punctata
- †Eridotrypa
- †Erismacanthus
  - †Erismacanthus barbatus
- †Erismodus
  - †Erismodus radicans
- †Escharopora
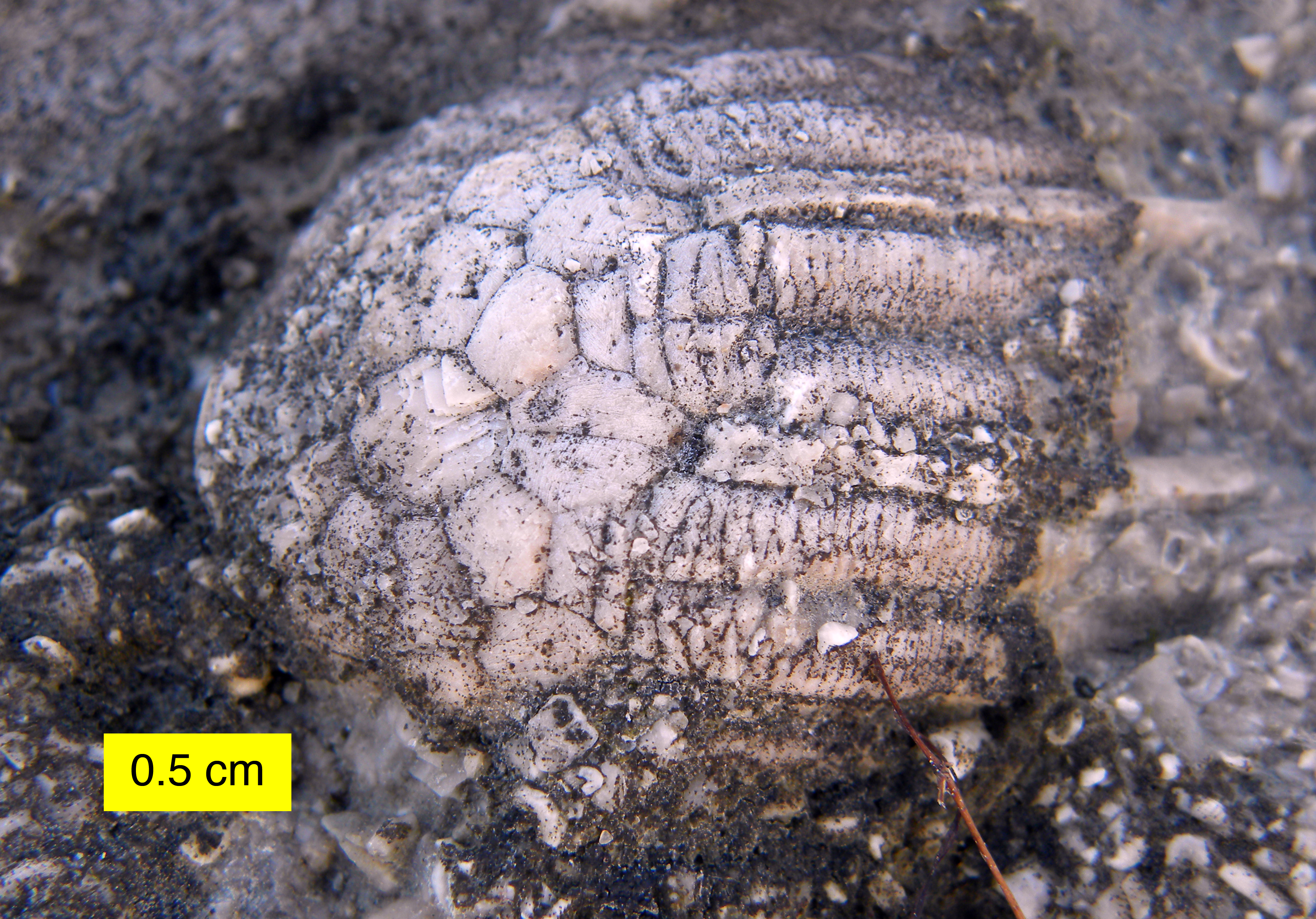
- Fossilized calyx of the Silurian-Middle Devonian crinoid ("sea lily") Eucalyptocrinites
  †Eucalyptocrinites
  - †Eucalyptocrinites depressus
  - †Eucalyptocrinites inornatus
  - †Eucalyptocrinites ornatus – or unidentified comparable form
  - †Eucalyptocrinites proboscidalis
- †Eukloedenella
  - †Eukloedenella richmondensis
- †Eumetria
  - †Eumetria iowensis
  - †Eumetria osagensis
- †Eumorphocystis
- †Eunema
  - †Eunema quadrisulcata
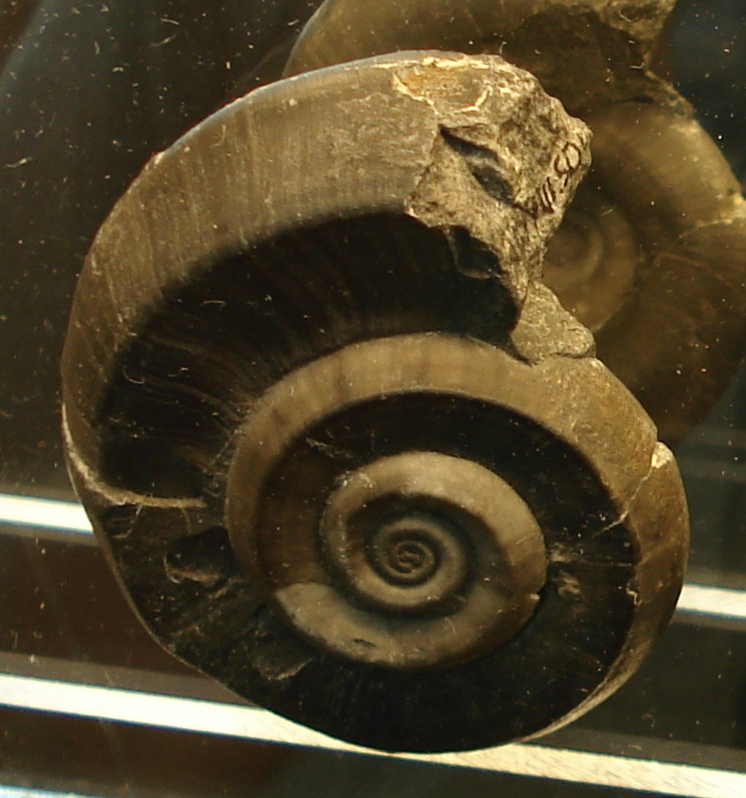
- Fossilized shell of the Silurian-Permian sea snail Euomphalus
  †Euomphalus
  - †Euomphalus angularis
  - †Euomphalus obtusus
- †Euphemites
  - †Euphemites lentiformis
  - †Euphemites urei
- †Euprimitia
  - †Euprimitia celata
  - †Euprimitia flores
  - †Euprimitia labiosa
  - †Euprimitia linepunctata
  - †Euprimitia minuta
  - †Euprimitia sanctipauli
- †Euptychocrinus
  - †Euptychocrinus skopaios
- †Eurychilina
  - †Eurychilina incurva
  - †Eurychilina minutifoveata
  - †Eurychilina partifimbriata
  - †Eurychilina reticulata
  - †Eurychilina subradiata
  - †Eurychilina ventrosa
- †Eutaxocrinus
  - †Eutaxocrinus gracilis
- †Exocrinus
  - †Exocrinus multirami

== F ==
- †Fardenia – tentative report
- †Favosites
- †Fenestella
- †Fenestrellina
- †Ferganella
- †Fistulipora
- †Flabellitesia
  - †Flabellitesia flabellites
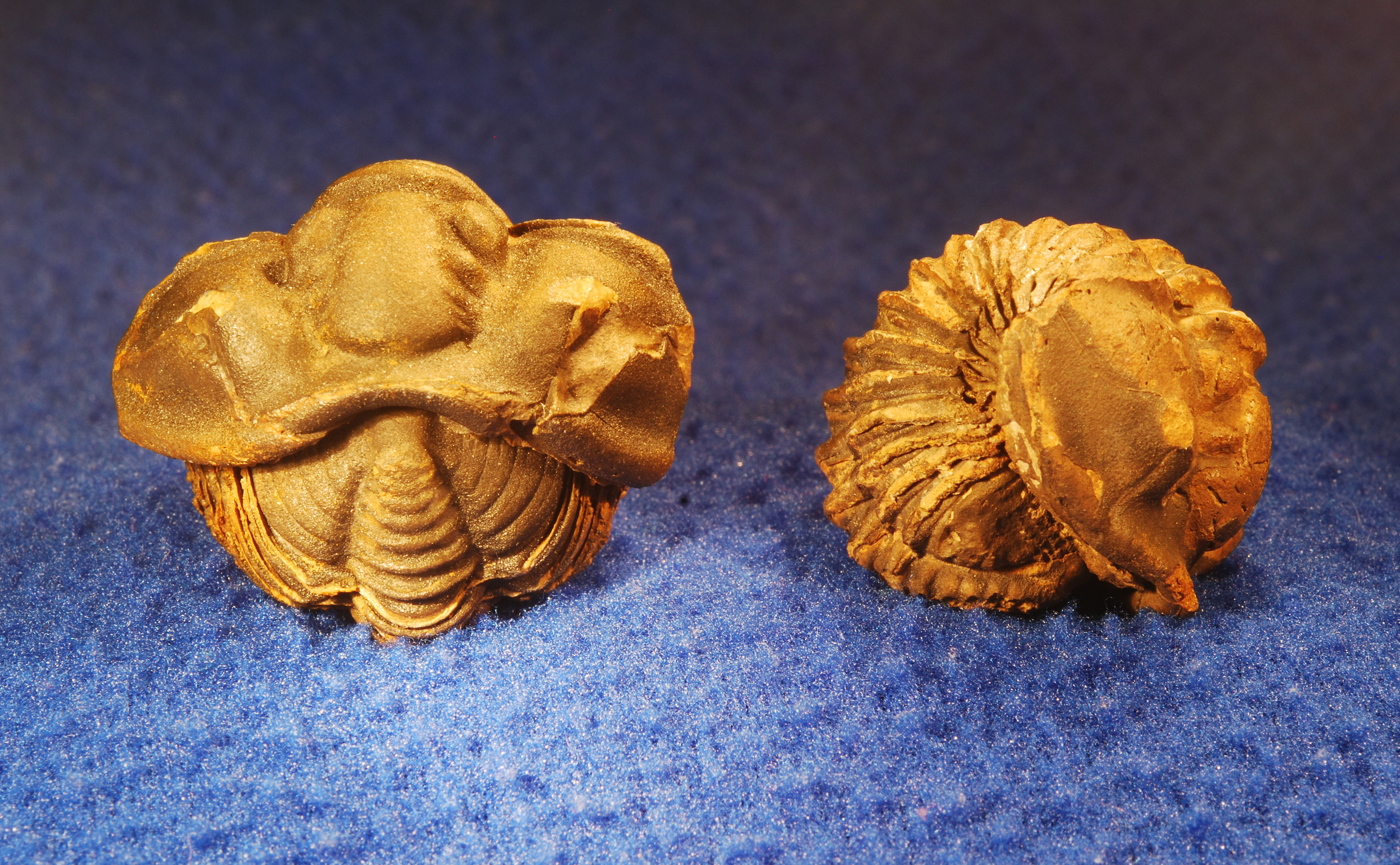
- Front (left) and right side (right) views of an enrolled fossil of the Middle Ordovician-Silurian trilobite Flexicalymene
  †Flexicalymene
- †Floweria
  - †Floweria altirostris
  - †Floweria orthoplicata
  - †Floweria prava
- †Floyda
  - †Floyda concentrica
- †Fourstonella

== G ==
- †Galateacrinus
  - †Galateacrinus gossameri
- †Gilmocrinus
- †Girtyella
  - †Girtyella indianse
- †Glabrocingulum
  - †Glabrocingulum angulosa – type locality for species
  - †Glabrocingulum minutum – type locality for species
- †Glaphyrites
- †Glossites
- †Glyptorthis
  - †Glyptorthis pulchra – type locality for species
  - †Glyptorthis subcircularis – type locality for species
- †Gomphocystites
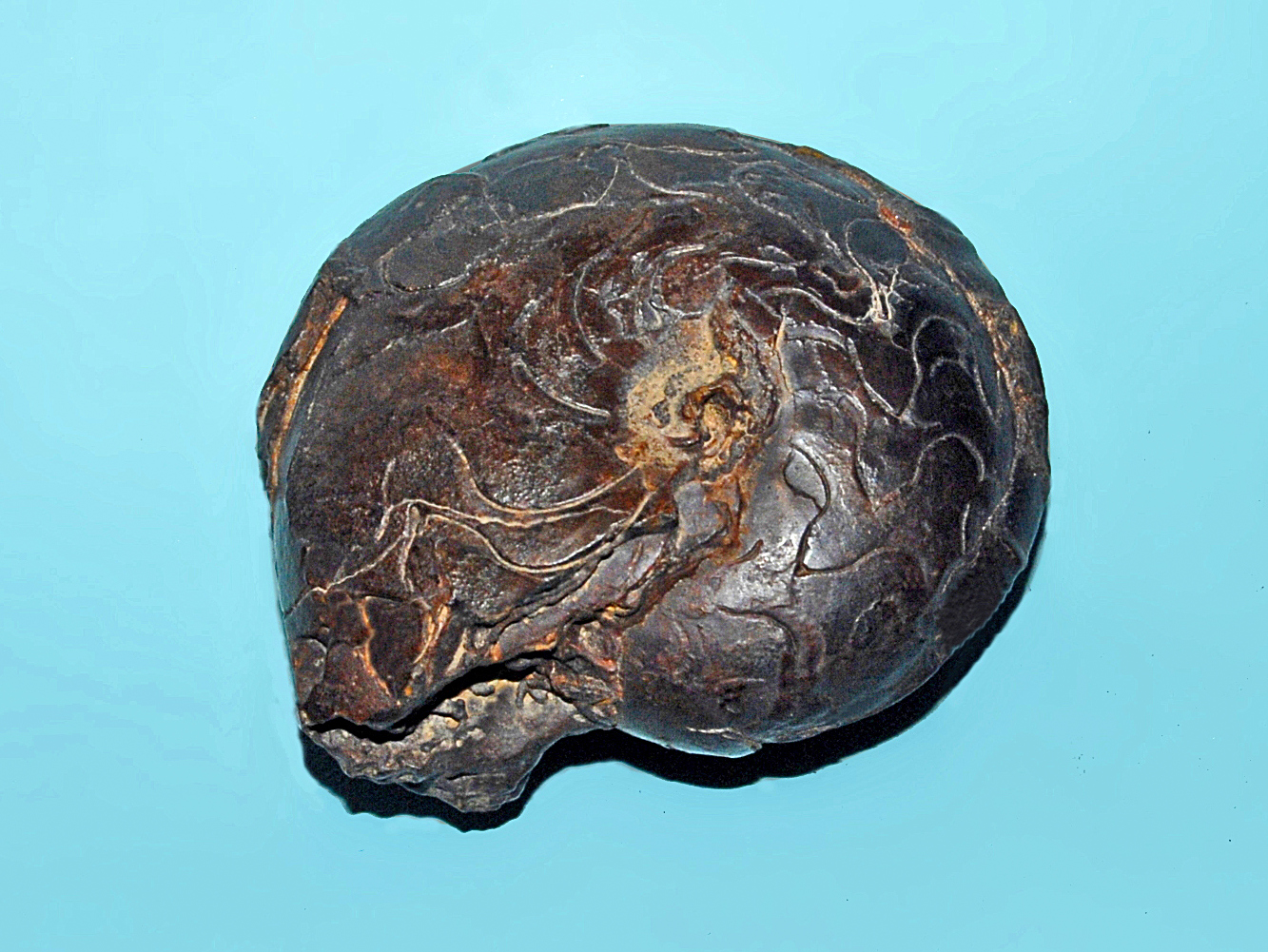
- Fossilized shell of the Late Devonian-Late Triassic ammonoid cephalopod Goniatites
  †Goniatites
- †Goniocrinus
- †Goniophyllum
  - †Goniophyllum pyramidale
- †Gorgonophontes
  - †Gorgonophontes peleron
- †Graffhamicrinus
  - †Graffhamicrinus magnijkus
  - †Graffhamicrinus subcoronatus
- †Grammysia
  - †Grammysia amygdalinus
- †Gravicalymene
- †Greenops
  - †Greenops barrisi
  - †Greenops fitzpatricki
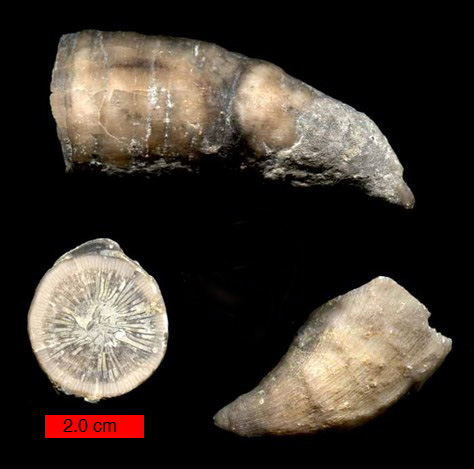
- Multiple views of a fossil of the Ordovician horn coral Grewingkia
  †Grewingkia
- †Gypidula
  - †Gypidula cornuta
  - †Gypidula munda
  - †Gypidula occidentalis
  - †Gypidula papyracea
  - †Gypidula parva
- †Gypidulina
- †Gyroceras

== H ==
- †Hadrorhynchia
  - †Hadrorhynchia solon
- †Haeretocrinus
  - †Haeretocrinus missouriensis
- †Hagnocrinus
- †Hallatia
  - †Hallatia convexa
  - †Hallatia duplicata
  - †Hallatia particylincrica
  - †Hallatia particylindrica
- †Hallicystis
- †Halliella
  - †Halliella magnipunctata
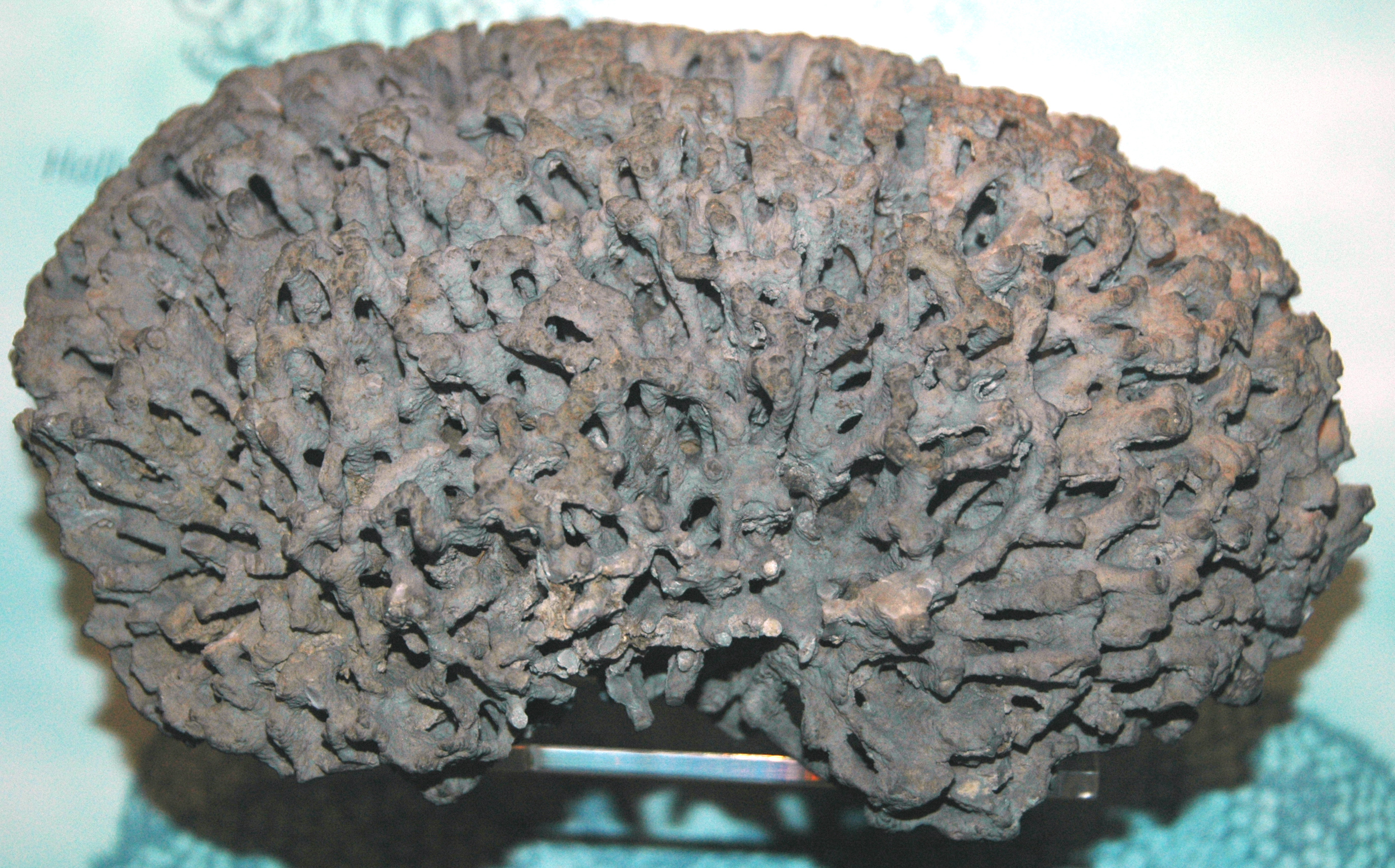
- Fossil of the Ordovician bryozoan ("moss animal") Hallopora
  †Hallopora
- †Halysiocrinus
  - †Halysiocrinus barrisi
  - †Halysiocrinus elephantinus – type locality for species
- †Halysites
- †Hammatostroma
  - †Hammatostroma albertense
- †Harpidella – tentative report
  - †Harpidella brandonensis
- †Harpidium
  - †Harpidium luckeyensis – or unidentified related form
  - †Harpidium maquoketa
- †Hedeina
- †Heliolites
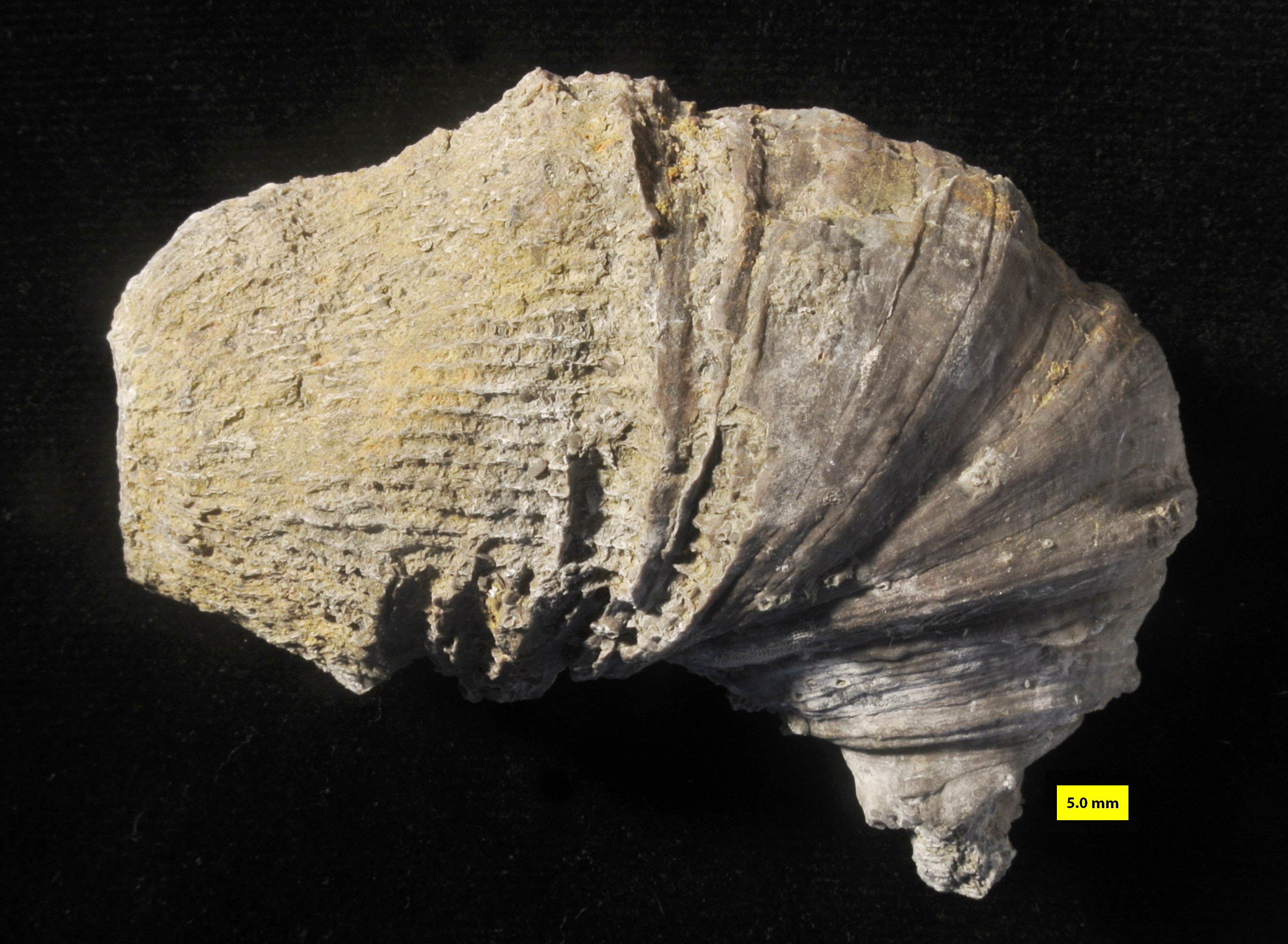
- Fossil of the Middle Devonian horn coral Heliophyllum
  †Heliophyllum
  - †Heliophyllum solidum
- †Helliella
  - †Helliella magnipunctata
- †Hemicystites
- †Hemiphragma
- †Hemiplethorhynchus
  - †Hemiplethorhynchus subovatum
- †Hermatostroma
  - †Hermatostroma polymorphum
- †Hernodia
- †Hesperidella
  - †Hesperidella initialis
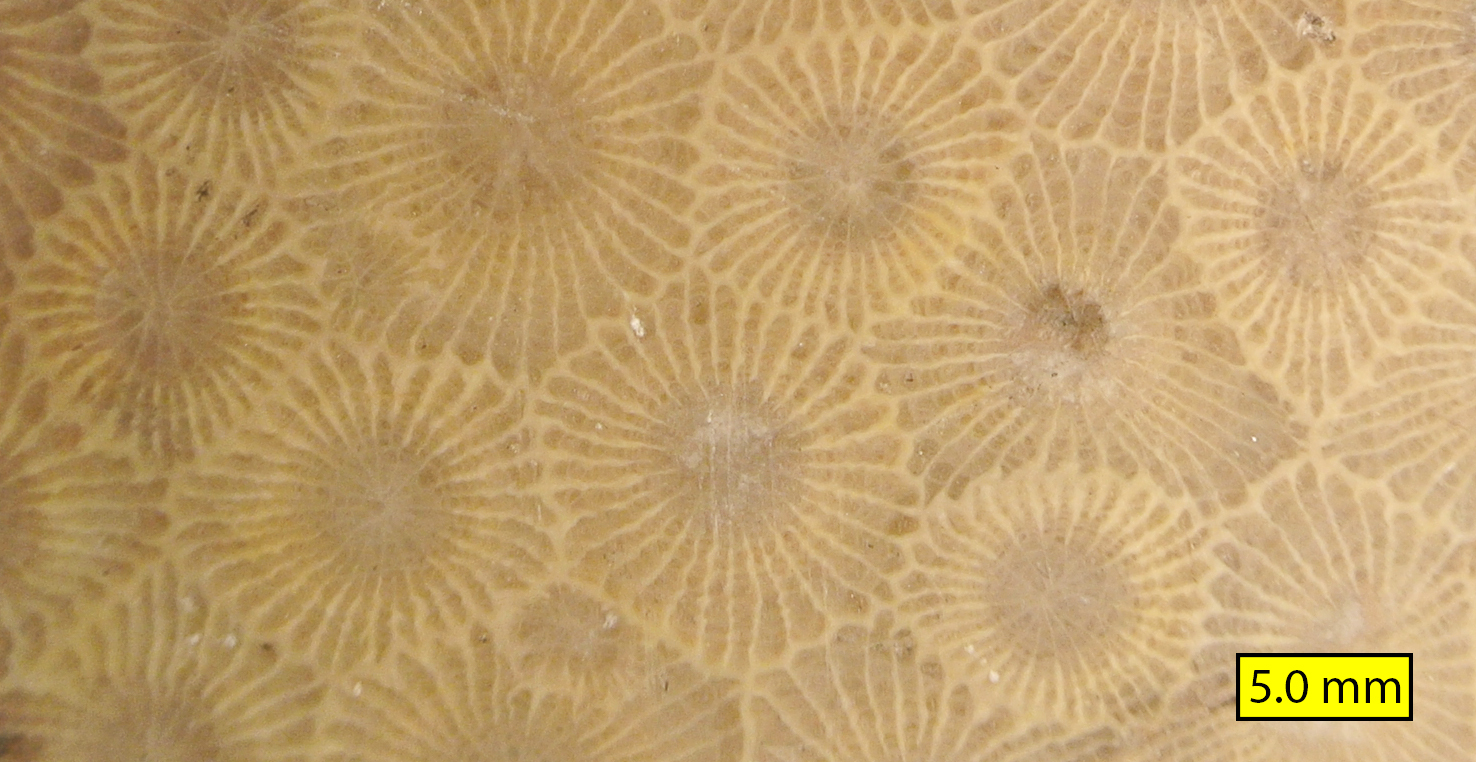
- Fossil of the Devonian colonial rugose coral Hexagonaria, also known as a Petoskey stone
  †Hexagonaria
  - †Hexagonaria bassleri
  - †Hexagonaria inequalis
  - †Hexagonaria oweni
  - †Hexagonaria whitfieldi
- †Hibbardella
  - †Hibbardella subacoda
- †Hindella
- †Hindia
  - †Hindia parva – tentative report
  - †Hindia sphaeroidalis
- †Holcocrinus
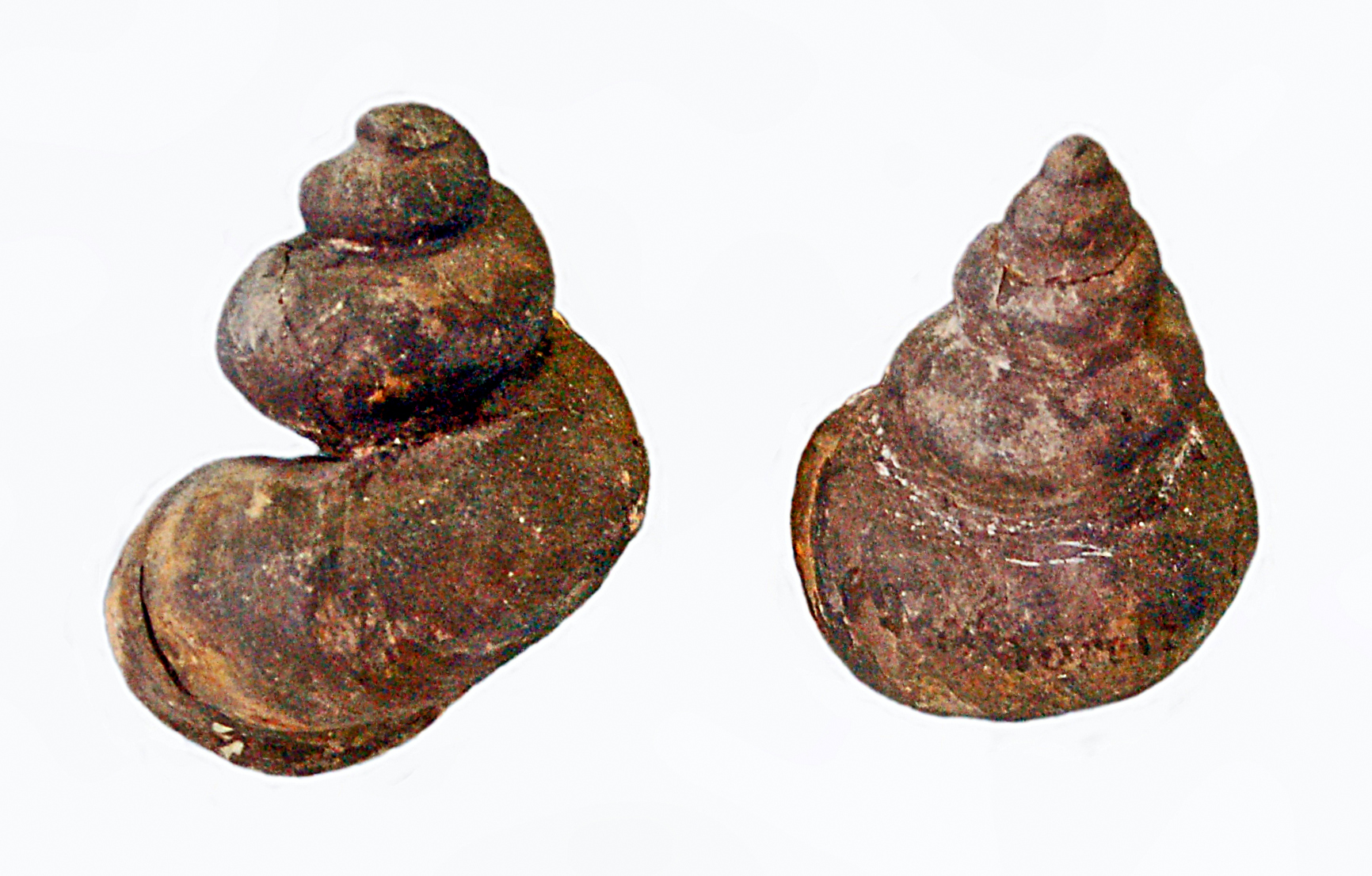
- Fossilized shells of the Ordovician-Carboniferous sea snail Holopea
  †Holopea
  - †Holopea iowaensis
- †Homacanthus
  - †Homacanthus delicatulus
- †Homoeospira
- †Homotrypella
- †Hormotoma
  - †Hormotoma gracilis
- †Howellella
- †Hudsonaster
- †Huronia
- †Hustedia
- †Hyattidina
- †Hybocrinus
  - †Hybocrinus conicus

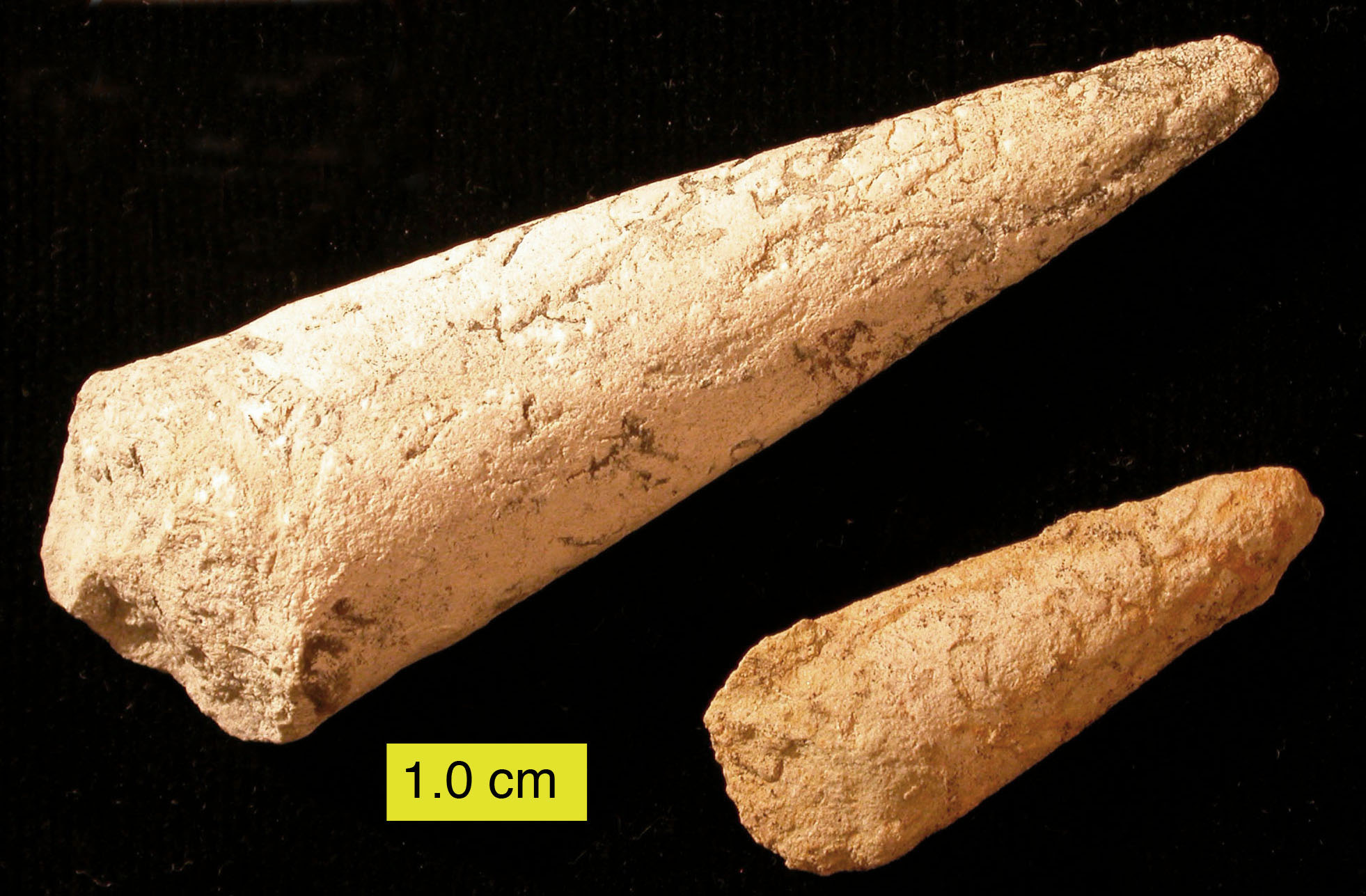
Fossilized shells of the Cambrian-Permian brachiopod relative Hyolitha

†Hyolithes

  - †Hyolithes parviusculus
- †Hypergonia
  - †Hypergonia percarinata
- †Hypothyridina
  - †Hypothyridina emmonsi
  - †Hypothyridina intermedia
  - †Hypothyridina magister
- †Hypselocrinus
- †Hypsitycha
  - †Hypsitycha hybrida
- †Hysitycha
  - †Hysitycha neenah
- †Hystriculina

== I ==
- †Ianthinopsis
  - †Ianthinopsis pinguis – type locality for species
- †Icriodus
  - †Icriodus calvini – type locality for species
  - †Icriodus latericrescens
  - †Icriodus nodosus
  - †Icriodus orri – type locality for species
  - †Icriodus subterminus
- †Icthyocrinus
- †Idiognathodus
  - †Idiognathodus attenuatus – type locality for species
  - †Idiognathodus claviformis
  - †Idiognathodus iowaensis – type locality for species
- †Ignoceras
  - †Ignoceras undata
- †Indospirifer
  - †Indospirifer orestes
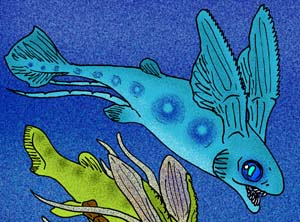
- Life restoration of the Carboniferous Chimaera relative Iniopteryx
  †Iniopteryx
  - †Iniopteryx rushlaui
  - †Iniopteryx tedwhitei
- †Iocrinus
- †Iowacystis
  - †Iowacystis sagittaria
- †Iowaphyllum
  - †Iowaphyllum johanni
- †Iowatrypa
  - †Iowatrypa americana
  - †Iowatrypa owenensis
- †Ischadites
- †Isorthis
- †Isorthoceras
  - †Isorthoceras sociale
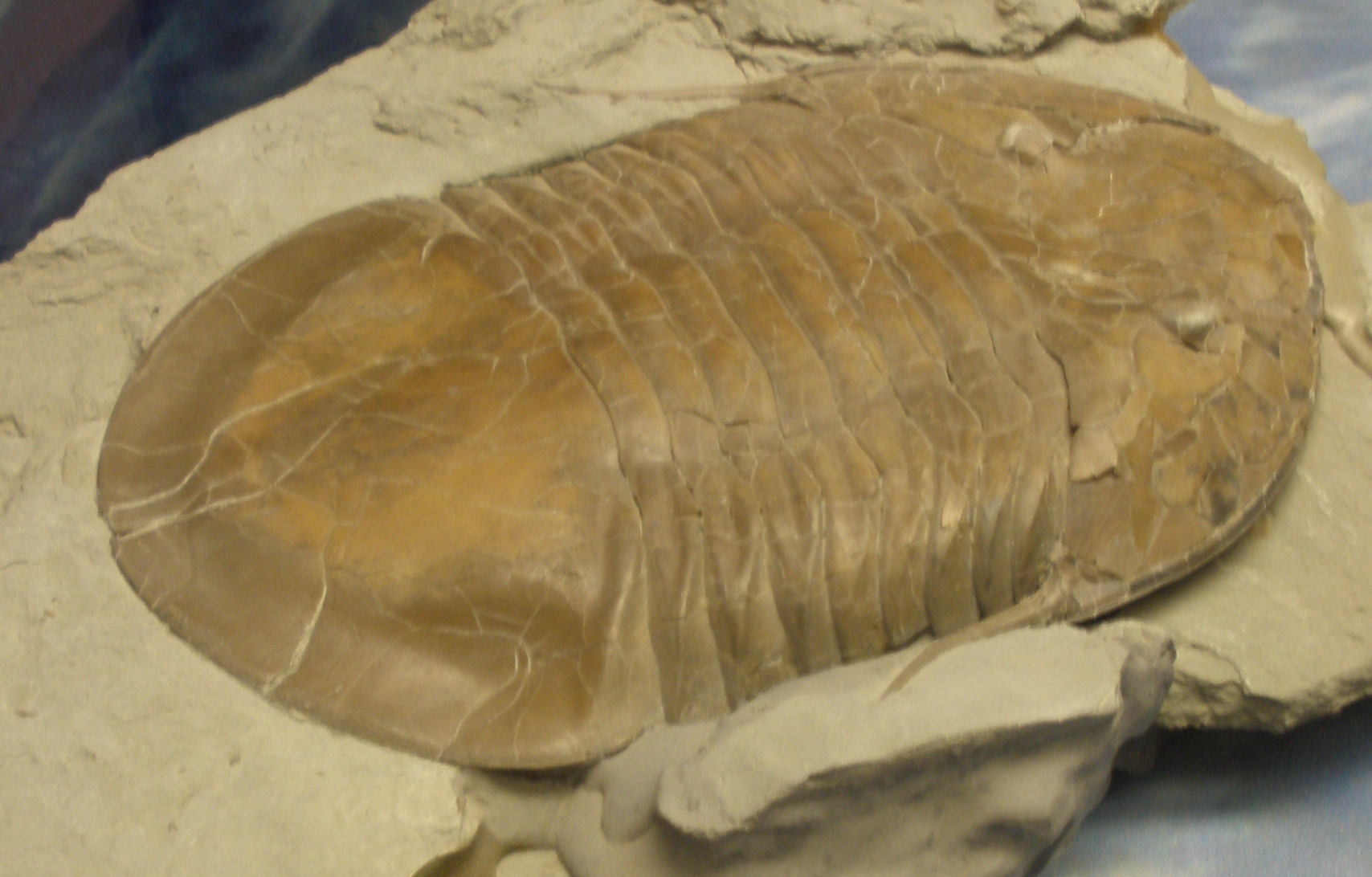
- Fossil of the Middle-Late Ordovician giant trilobite Isotelus.
  †Isotelus

== J ==
- †Juresania

== K ==
- †Kaskia
- †Kayoceras
- †Kiesowia
  - †Kiesowia binoda
  - †Kiesowia insolens
- †Kinocrinus
  - †Kinocrinus inflatus
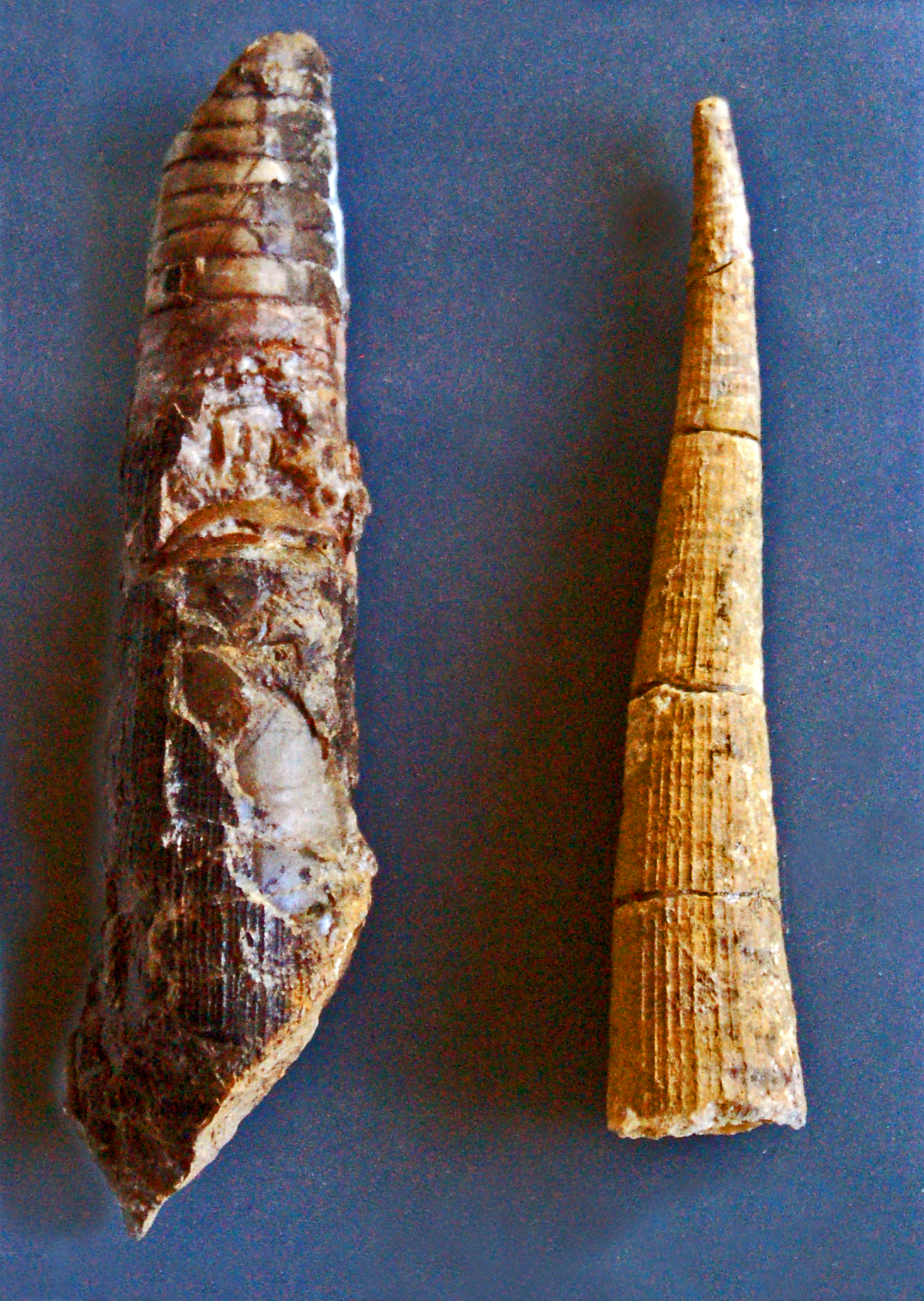
- Fossilized shells of the Middle Ordovician-Permian nautiloid cephalopod Kionoceras
  †Kionoceras
  - †Kionoceras decorahense – type locality for species
- †Kirkidium
- †Kitikamispira – tentative report
  - †Kitikamispira perstrialis – type locality for species
- †Knightella
  - †Knightella shumardiana – type locality for species
- †Kosovopeltis
  - †Kosovopeltis acamas
- †Krausella
  - †Krausella arcuata
  - †Krausella curtispina
  - †Krausella inaequalis
- †Krinocrinus
  - †Krinocrinus inflatus

== L ==
- †Laccoprimitia
  - †Laccoprimitia elegantula
  - †Laccoprimitia fillmorensis
- †Lacertasterias – type locality for genus
  - †Lacertasterias elegans – type locality for species
- †Laddella
  - †Laddella insueta
- †Ladogioides
  - †Ladogioides solon
- Laevidentalium
- †Lamottia
  - †Lamottia heroensis
- †Lampterocrinus
- †Lanecrinus – tentative report
- †Leangella
- †Lecanocrinus
- †Lecathylus
  - †Lecathylus gregarius
- †Lechritochoceras
- †Leioclema
  - †Leioclema occidens
- †Leiorhynchus
  - †Leiorhynchus argenteum
  - †Leiorhynchus gosseleti
  - †Leiorhynchus iris
- †Leperditella
  - †Leperditella dorsicornis
  - †Leperditella fryei
  - †Leperditella macra
  - †Leperditella millepunctata
  - †Leperditella persimilis
  - †Leperditella sacceliformis
- †Leperditia
- †Lepidocyclus
- †Lepidoleptaena – or unidentified related form
- †Leptaena
  - †Leptaena rhomboidalis
- †Leptagonia
  - †Leptagonia analoga
- †Leptellina
- †Leptobolus
  - †Leptobolus occidentalis
- †Leptodesma
  - †Leptodesma acutilaris
  - †Leptodesma subovata
- †Leptopora
  - †Leptopora typa
- †Leptoptygma
  - †Leptoptygma oligospira – type locality for species
- †Leptostrophia – tentative report
- †Leptotrypella
- †Lichenalia
- †Lichenocrinus
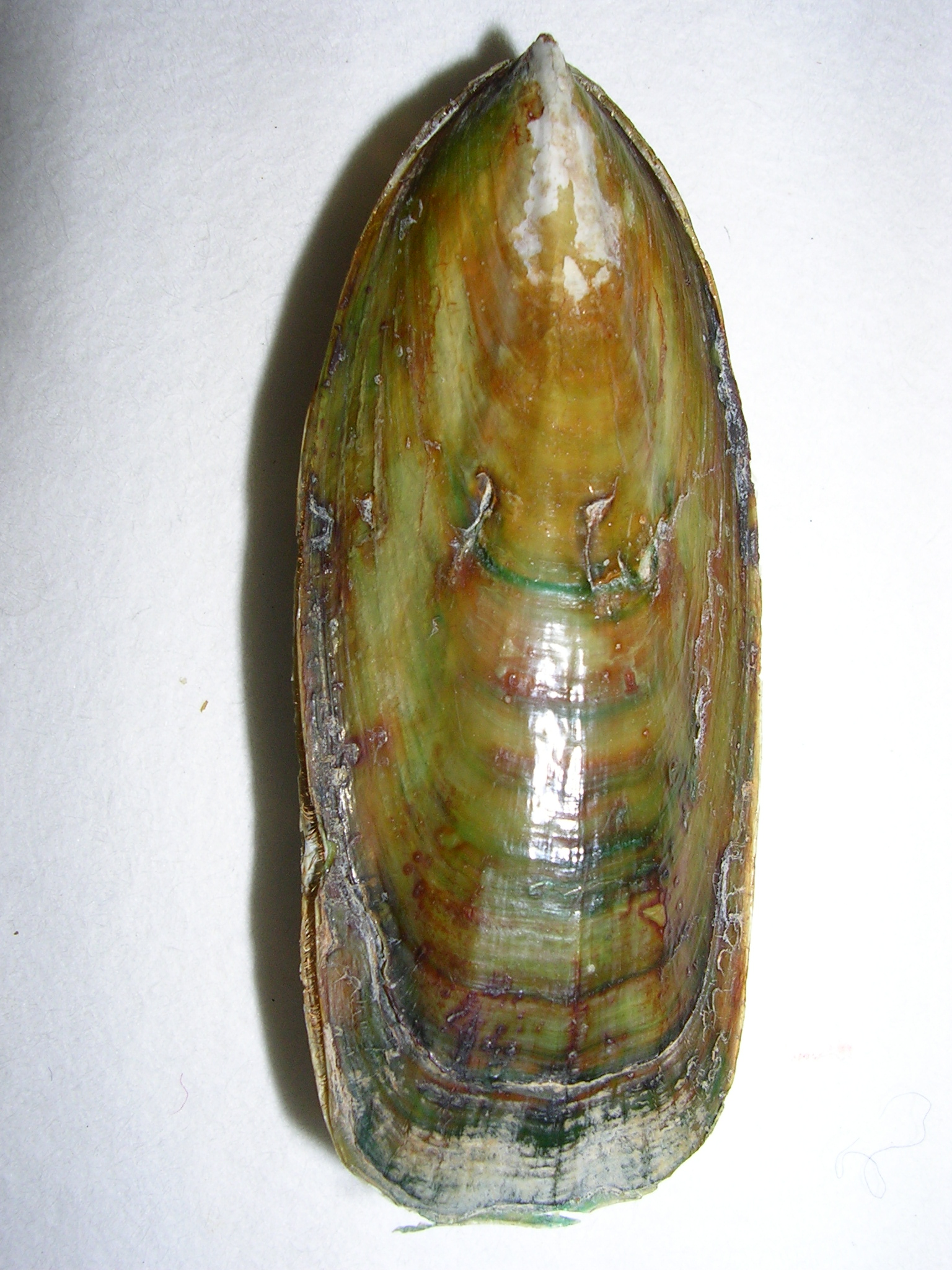
- Shell of the Cambrian-modern brachiopod Lingula
  †Lingula
  - †Lingula changi
  - †Lingula cuneata
  - †Lingula fragila
  - †Lingula milwaukeensis – or unidentified comparable form
  - †Lingula milwaukiensis
- †Lingulodiscina
  - †Lingulodiscina marginalis
- †Linocrinus
- †Linoporella
- †Linoproductus
  - †Linoproductus ovatus
- †Liospira
  - †Liospira micula
  - †Liospira spicula – or unidentified comparable form
- †Litostrobus
  - †Litostrobus iowensis
  - †Litostrobus paulus
- †Lonchodus – tentative report
- †Lophophyllidium
- †Lophospira
  - †Lophospira depauperata
- †Lorangerella
  - †Lorangerella gregaria
- †Loxonema
- †Lumbriconereites
- †Luxocrinus
  - †Luxocrinus simplex
- †Lyonicrinus
- †Lyriocrinus
- †Lysocystites
  - †Lysocystites nodosus
- †Lytospira

== M ==
- †Macgeea
  - †Macgeea camplanulata – type locality for species
  - †Macgeea concinnula – type locality for species
  - †Macgeea culmula
  - †Macgeea solitaria
- †Macrocrinus
  - †Macrocrinus mundulus
- Macrocypris
  - †Macrocypris kayi
- †Macrocyproides
  - †Macrocyproides clermontensis
- †Macronotella
  - †Macronotella arcta
  - †Macronotella scofeldi
  - †Macronotella scofieldi
- †Macropotamorhynchus
  - †Macropotamorhynchus tuta
- †Macrostylocrinus
  - †Macrostylocrinus compressus
  - †Macrostylocrinus obpyramidalis – or unidentified comparable form
  - †Macrostylocrinus vermiculatus
- †Manicrinus
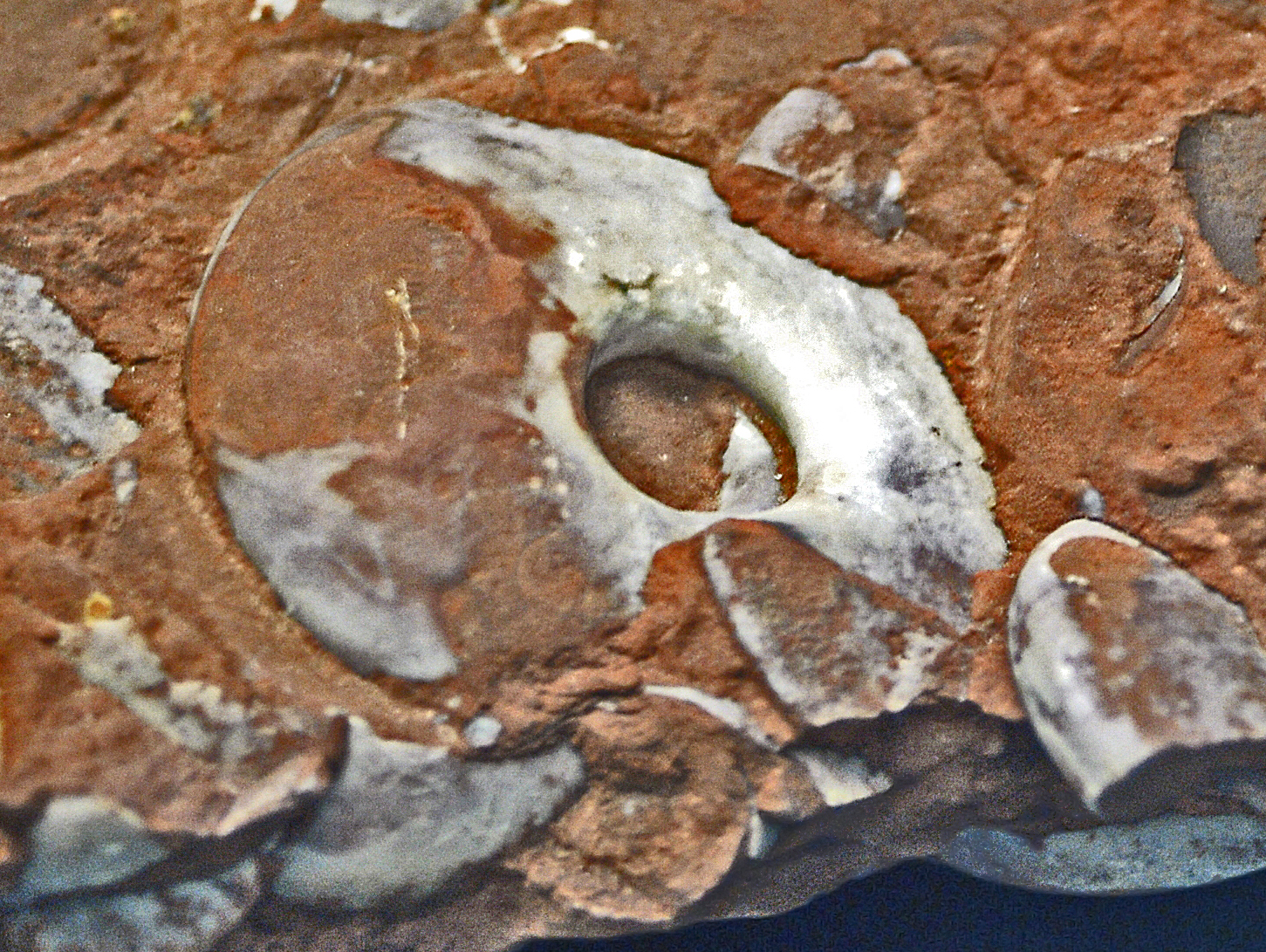
- Fossilized shell of the Devonian ammonoid cephalopod Manticoceras
  †Manticoceras
  - †Manticoceras regulare
- †Manticrinus
- †Maquoketacrinus
  - †Maquoketacrinus ornatus
- †Maratia
  - †Maratia mara
  - †Maratia micula
- †Marsupiocrinus
  - †Marsupiocrinus primaevus
- †Mediospirifer
- †Megalomoidea
- †Megamyonia
  - †Megamyonia unicostata
- †Megastrophia
  - †Megastrophia profunda
- †Megistocrinus
  - †Megistocrinus pernodosus
- †Melocrinites
- †Merista
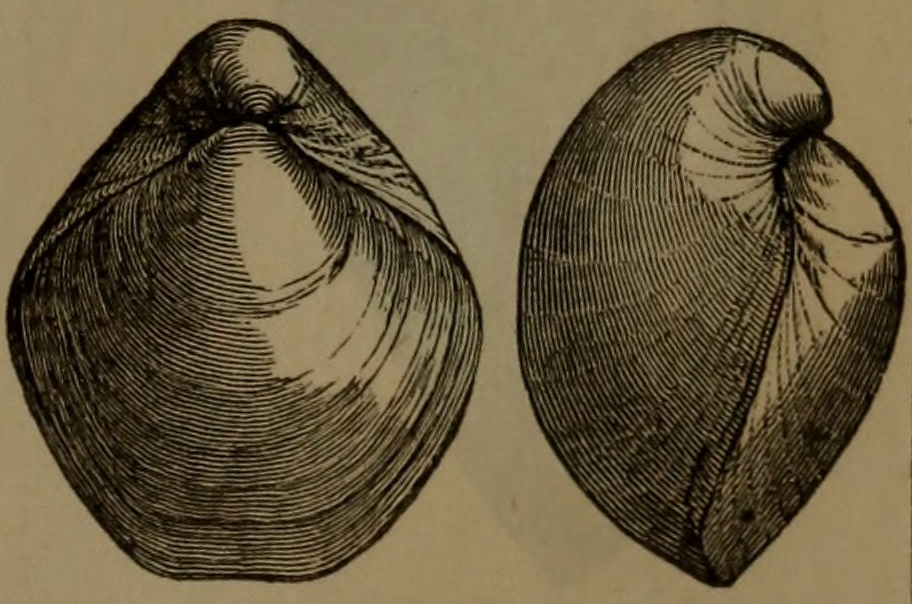
- Illustration (lower right, entry 15) of a fossilized shell in front and side views of the Silurian-Late Devonian brachiopod Meristella
  †Meristella
  - †Meristella parva
- †Meristina
- †Merocrinus
- †Mesoblastus – or unidentified comparable form
- †Mesolobus
- †Metaconularia
- †Metalonchodina
  - †Metalonchodina deflecta – type locality for species
- †Michelia
- †Michelinoceras
- †Microcardinalia
- †Milleratia
  - †Milleratia cincinnatiensis
  - †Milleratia cincinnattiensis
- †Mirifusella – type locality for genus
  - †Mirifusella fortunata – type locality for species
- †Modiomorpha
- †Monomerella
- †Murchisonia
- †Myalina
- †Mycterops
  - †Mycterops whitei – type locality for species
- †Myeinocystites
- †Myelodactylus
- †Mystrocephala
  - †Mystrocephala pulchra – or unidentified comparable form
  - †Mystrocephala raripustulosus
- †Mytilarca

== N ==
- †Nactocrinus
- †Nalivkinia – tentative report
- †Nataliana – type locality for genus
  - †Nataliana sinuata – type locality for species
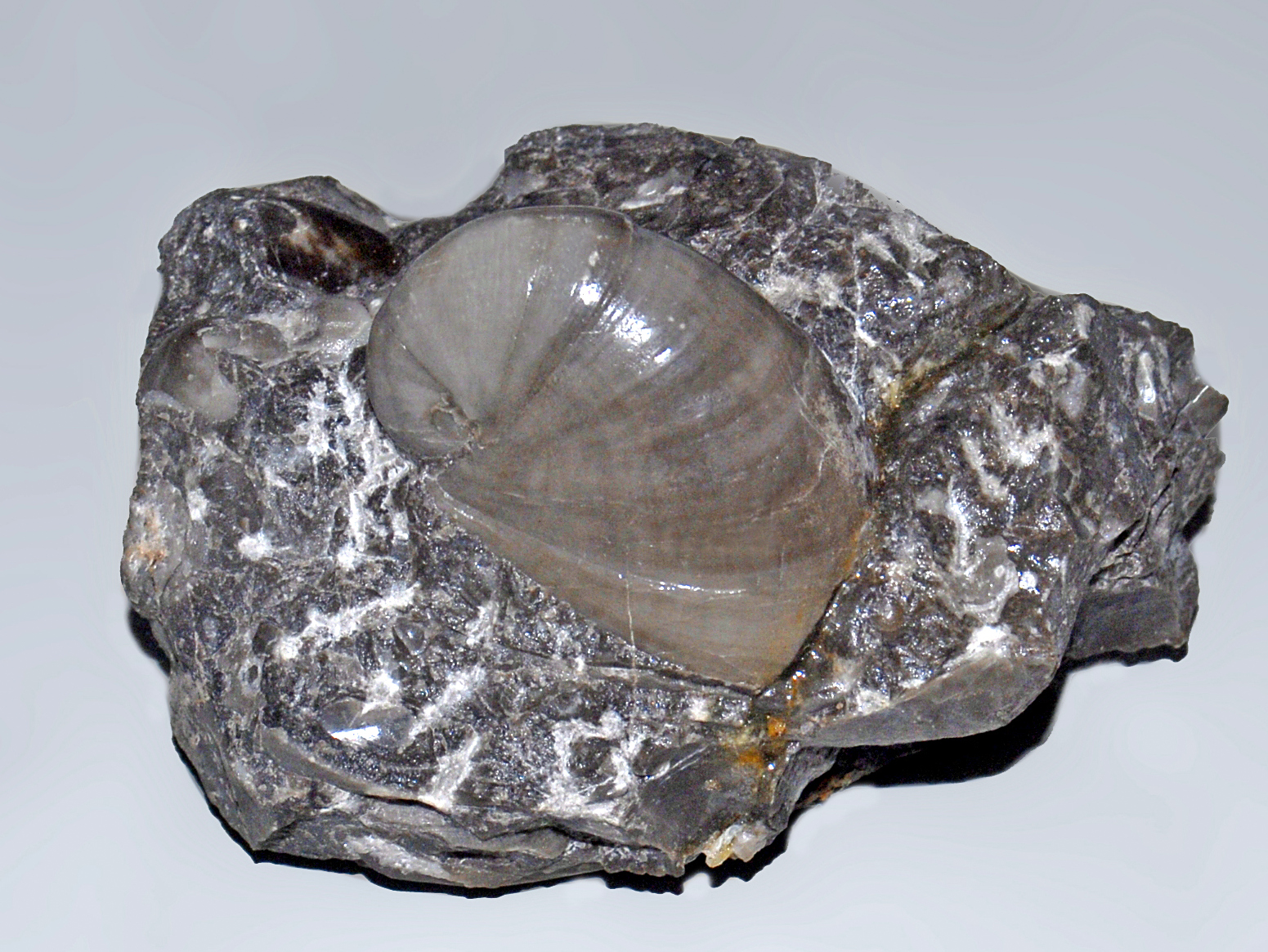
- Fossilized shell of the Early Devonian – Triassic sea snail Naticopsis
  †Naticopsis
  - †Naticopsis depressa – type locality for species
- †Neopanderodus
- †Neospirifer
- †Neozaphrentis
  - †Neozaphrentis pellaensis
- †Nervostrophia
  - †Nervostrophia calvini
  - †Nervostrophia canace
  - †Nervostrophia contaderoensis
  - †Nervostrophia extensa
  - †Nervostrophia multinervosa
  - †Nervostrophia rockfordensis
  - †Nervostrophia solida
  - †Nervostrophia thomasi
- †Newberria
  - †Newberria cordiforme
  - †Newberria johanni
- †Ningulella
  - †Ningulella paucisulcata
- †Nodambichilina
  - †Nodambichilina symmetrica
- †Nucellangium
  - †Nucellangium glabrum
- †Nucleospira
  - †Nucleospira barrisi
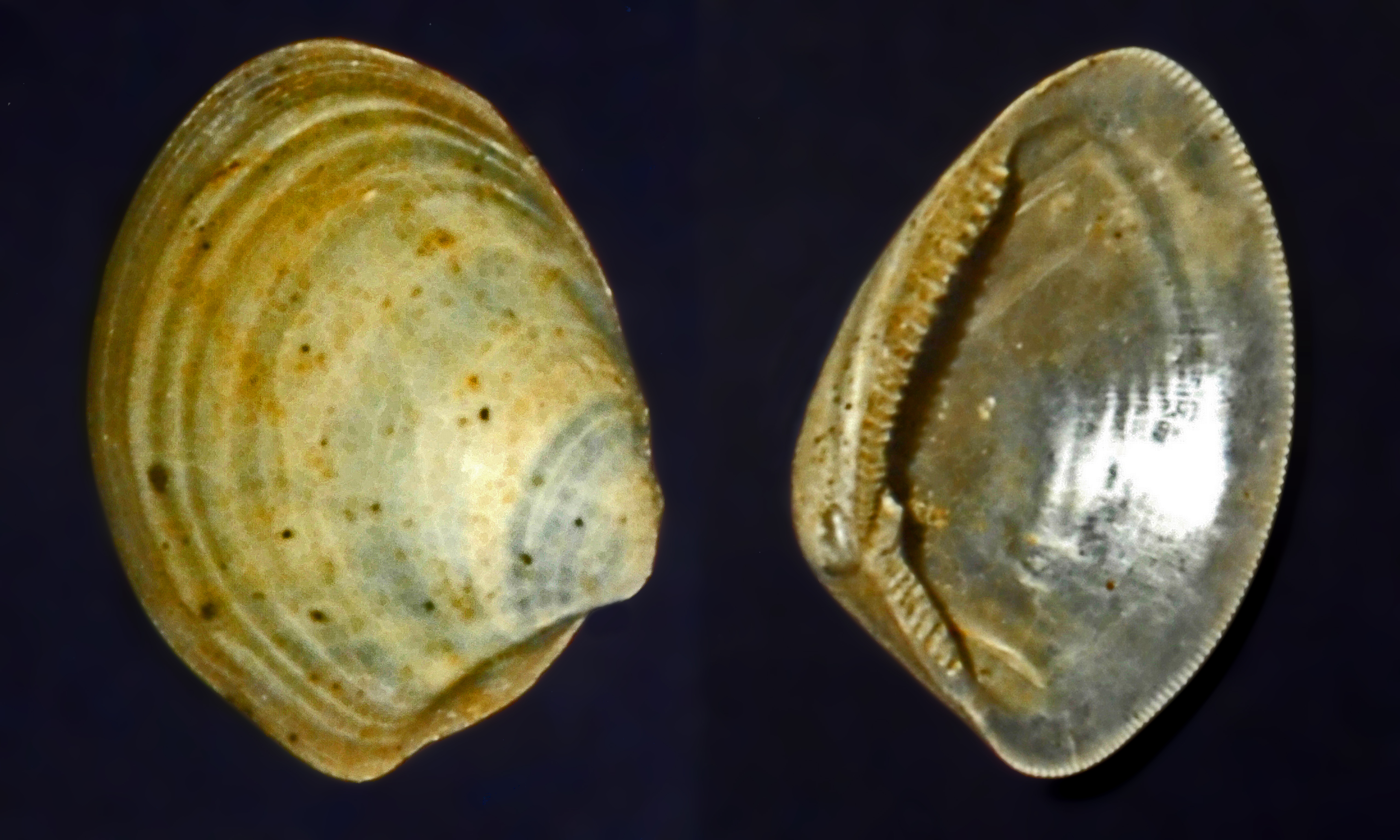
- Interior of a fossilized shell of the Early Ordovician-modern marine bivalve Nucula
  Nucula
  - †Nucula glanparkensis
  - †Nucula iowensis
- Nuculana
  - †Nuculana sacata
- †Nuculites
  - †Nuculites neglectus
- †Nuculopsis

== O ==
- †Odontopleura
- †Oepikina
- †Oistodus
  - †Oistodus venustus
- †Onniella
  - †Onniella quadrata
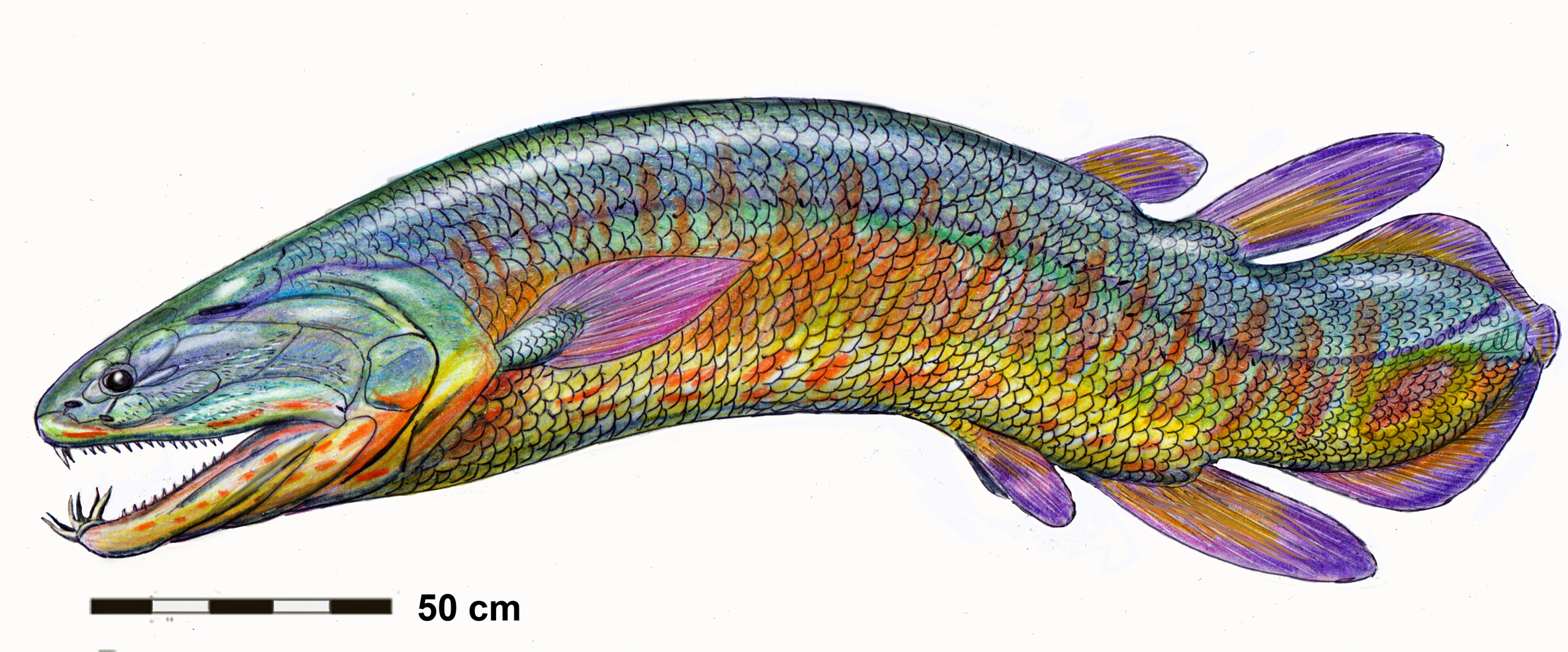
- Life restoration of the Middle-Late Devonian lobe-finned fish Onychodus
  †Onychodus
- †Opikatia
  - †Opikatia emaciata
  - †Opikatia rotunda
- †Opoa
- †Orbiculoidea
  - †Orbiculoidea telleri
  - †Orbiculoidea varsoviensis
  - †Orbiculoidea wardi
- †Orecopia
  - †Orecopia circinatus – type locality for species
- †Oriostoma
- †Orthoceras
  - †Orthoceras indianense
- †Orthodesma
- †Orthograptus
  - †Orthograptus eucharis
  - †Orthograptus truncatus
- †Orthonychia
  - †Orthonychia vomerium
- †Orthospirifer
  - †Orthospirifer capax
  - †Orthospirifer euruteines
  - †Orthospirifer iowensis
  - †Orthospirifer parryanus
- †Orthotetes
  - †Orthotetes kaskaskiensis
- †Otarion – tentative report
- †Oulodus
  - †Oulodus abbreviata – type locality for species
  - †Oulodus serratus
- †Ovatia
  - †Ovatia laevicostata
  - †Ovatia ovata
- †Ozarkodina
  - †Ozarkodina campbelli – type locality for species
  - †Ozarkodina delicatula
  - †Ozarkodina raaschi

== P ==
- †Pachyphyllum
  - †Pachyphyllum crassicostatum
  - †Pachyphyllum dumonti – type locality for species
  - †Pachyphyllum gregarium
  - †Pachyphyllum minutissimum
  - †Pachyphyllum websteri
  - †Pachyphyllum woodmani
- †Paladin
  - †Paladin wilsoni
- †Palaeocapulus
  - †Palaeocapulus equilateralis
- †Palaeoconcha
- †Palaeocyclus
- †Palaeoneilo
  - †Palaeoneilo barrisi
  - †Palaeoneilo fecunda
- †Palaeostachys
  - †Palaeostachys andrewsii
- †Palaeozygopleura
  - †Palaeozygopleura difficile
- †Palmatolepis
  - †Palmatolepis foliacea
  - †Palmatolepis semichatovae
- †Panderous
  - †Panderous gracilis
  - †Panderous panderi
- †Parabolbina
  - †Parabolbina antecedans
  - †Parabolbina carinifera
  - †Parabolbina staufferi
- †Paracosmetocrinus
- †Paracyclas
  - †Paracyclas dubia
  - †Paracyclas dubius
  - †Paracyclas elliptica
  - †Paracyclas parvula
  - †Paracyclas paucipleura
  - †Paracyclas proavia
  - †Paracyclas sabini
  - †Paracyclas validalinea
  - †Paracyclas validelinea
- †Paraphorhynchus
  - †Paraphorhynchus elongatum
  - †Paraphorhynchus striatocostatum
- †Paraschmidtella
  - †Paraschmidtella irregularis
  - †Paraschmidtella uphami
- †Parenthatia
  - †Parenthatia camerata
  - †Parenthatia punctata
- †Patellilabia
  - †Patellilabia scriptiferus
- †Paucicrura
  - †Paucicrura corpulenta
- †Paupospira
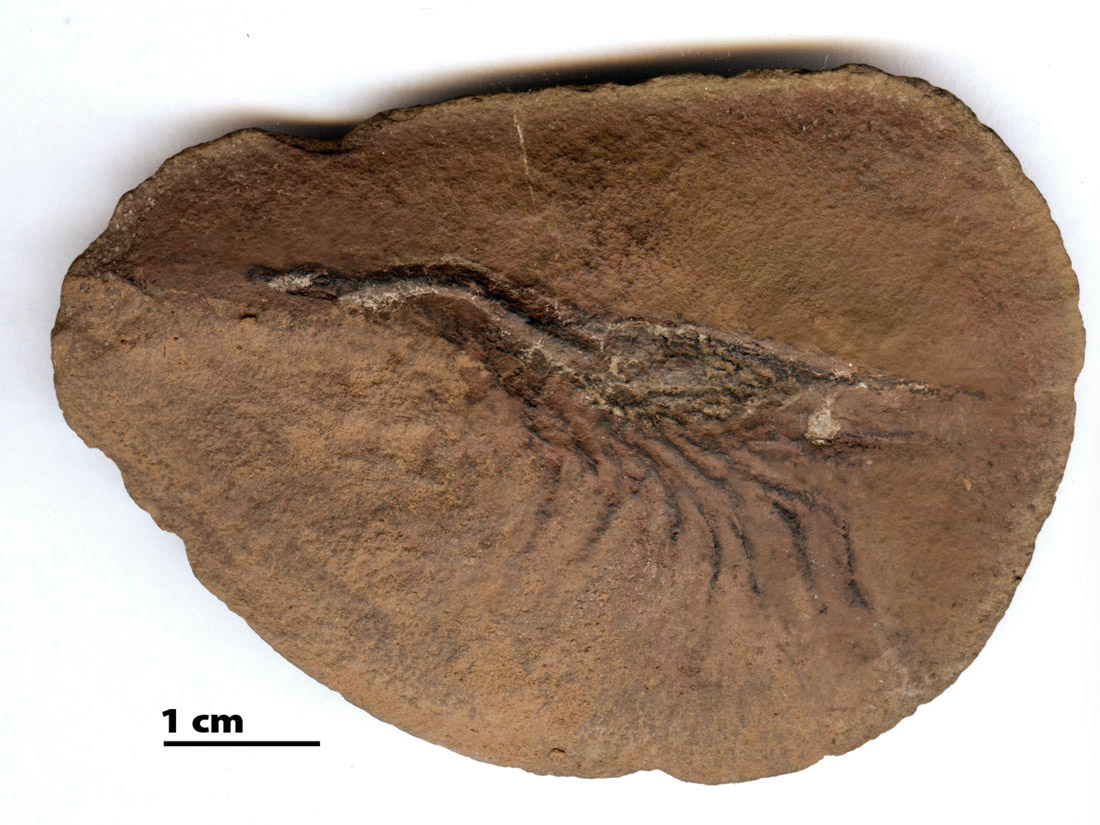
- Fossil of the Carboniferous crustacean Peachocaris
  †Peachocaris
  - †Peachocaris acanthouraea – type locality for species
- †Pedomphalella
  - †Pedomphalella intermedia
  - †Pedomphalella subovata
- †Pentamerella
  - †Pentamerella dubia
  - †Pentamerella laeviscula
  - †Pentamerella laeviuscula
  - †Pentamerella magna
  - †Pentamerella multicostella
  - †Pentamerella obsolescens
  - †Pentamerella rugosa
  - †Pentamerella subarata
- †Pentameroides
  - †Pentameroides corrugatus
  - †Pentameroides subrectus
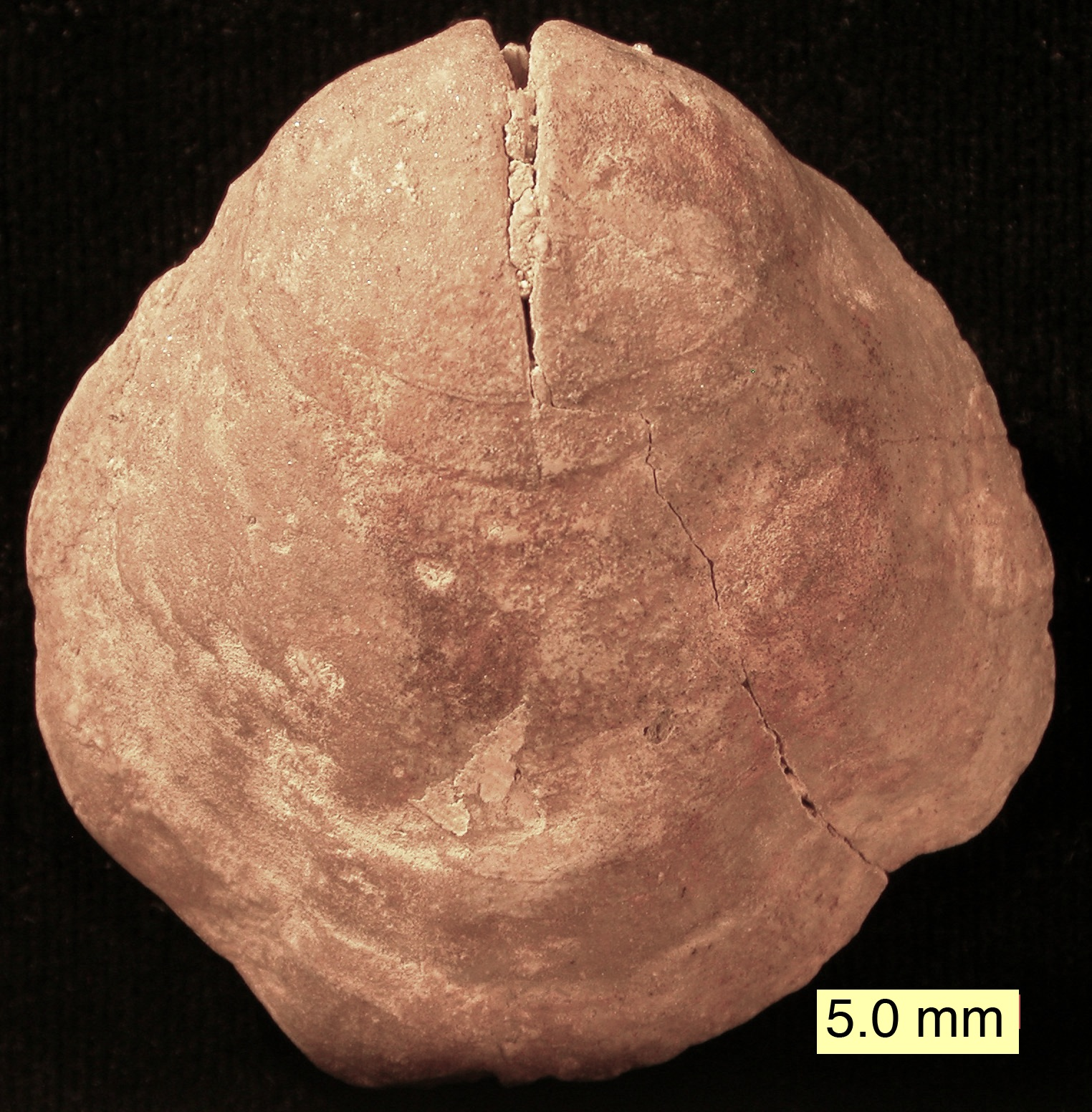
- Fossilized shell of the Silurian-Middle Devonian brachiopod Pentamerus
  †Pentamerus
  - †Pentamerus oblongus
- †Pentlandina
- †Pentremites
  - †Pentremites pulchellus
- †Perditocardinia
  - †Perditocardinia iowensis – type locality for species
- †Periechocrinus
- †Pernopecten
  - †Pernopecten cooperensis
- †Petalocrinus
  - †Petalocrinus mirabilis
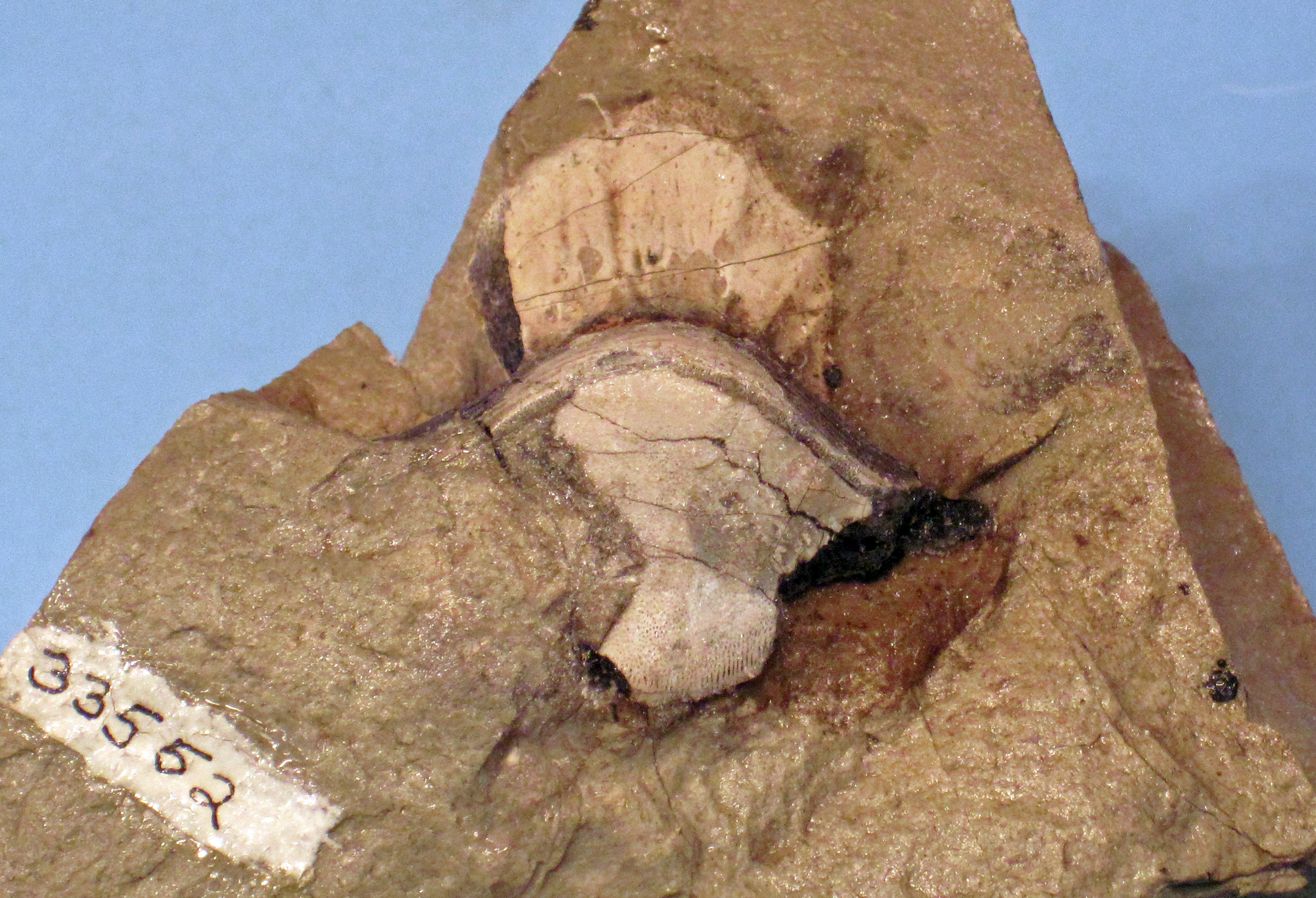
- Fossilized tooth of the Carboniferous-Permian shark Petalodus
  †Petalodus
  - †Petalodus allegheniensis
- †Petalotrypa
  - †Petalotrypa formosa
- †Petrocrania
  - †Petrocrania famelica
  - †Petrocrania familica
- †Petrodus
  - †Petrodus patelliformis
- †Phacops
  - †Phacops iowensis
- †Phanerotrema
- †Philhedra
  - †Philhedra sheldoni
- †Phillipsia
- †Phoebodus
  - †Phoebodus densneptuni – type locality for species
- †Pholidostrophia
  - †Pholidostrophia iowensis
- †Phragmoceras
- †Phragmodus
  - †Phragmodus cognitus
  - †Phragmodus undatus
- †Phricodothyris
- †Phymatopleura
- †Physonemus
  - †Physonemus hamuspiscatorius
  - †Physonemus pandatus
- †Piloricilla
  - †Piloricilla sedaliensis
- †Pinnocaris
  - †Pinnocaris americana – type locality for species
- †Pisocrinus
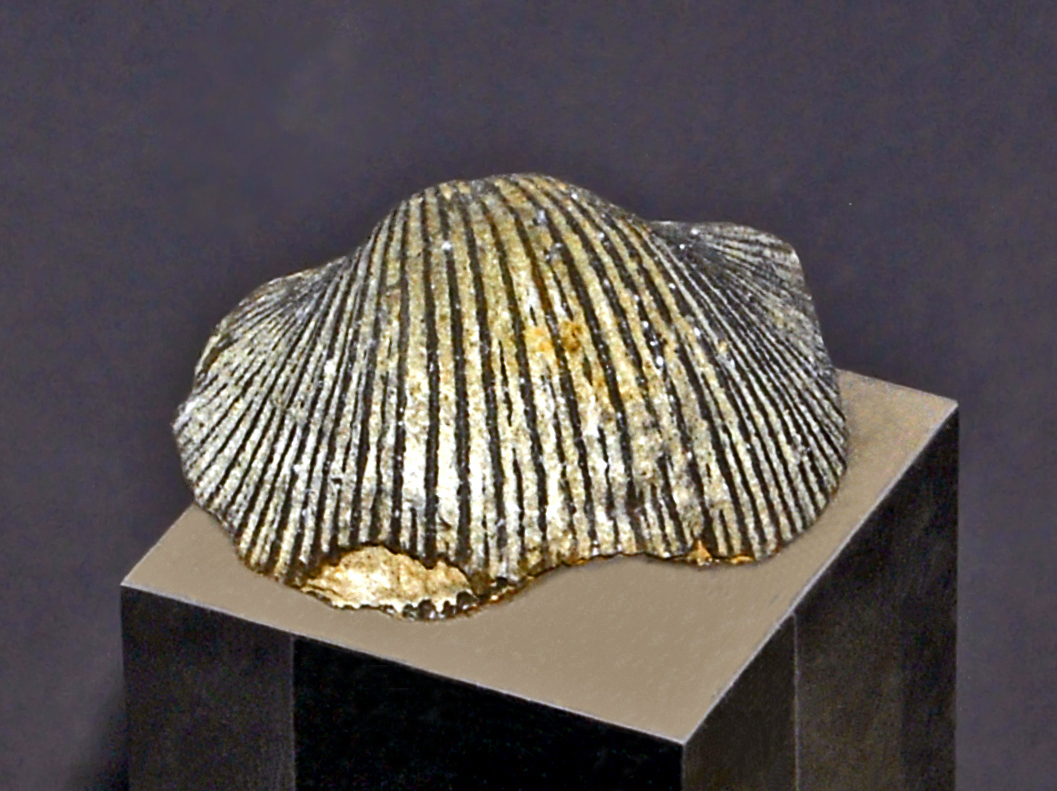
- Fossilized shell of the Ordovician brachiopod Plaesiomys
  †Plaesiomys
  - †Plaesiomys subquadrata
- †Plagioglypta
  - †Plagioglypta iowaensis
- †Planalvus – type locality for genus
  - †Planalvus gibberosa – type locality for species
- †Plasmopora
- †Platyceras
  - †Platyceras antiquum
  - †Platyceras insolitum
  - †Platyceras irrasum
  - †Platyceras latum – tentative report
  - †Platyceras nasutum
  - †Platyceras paralium
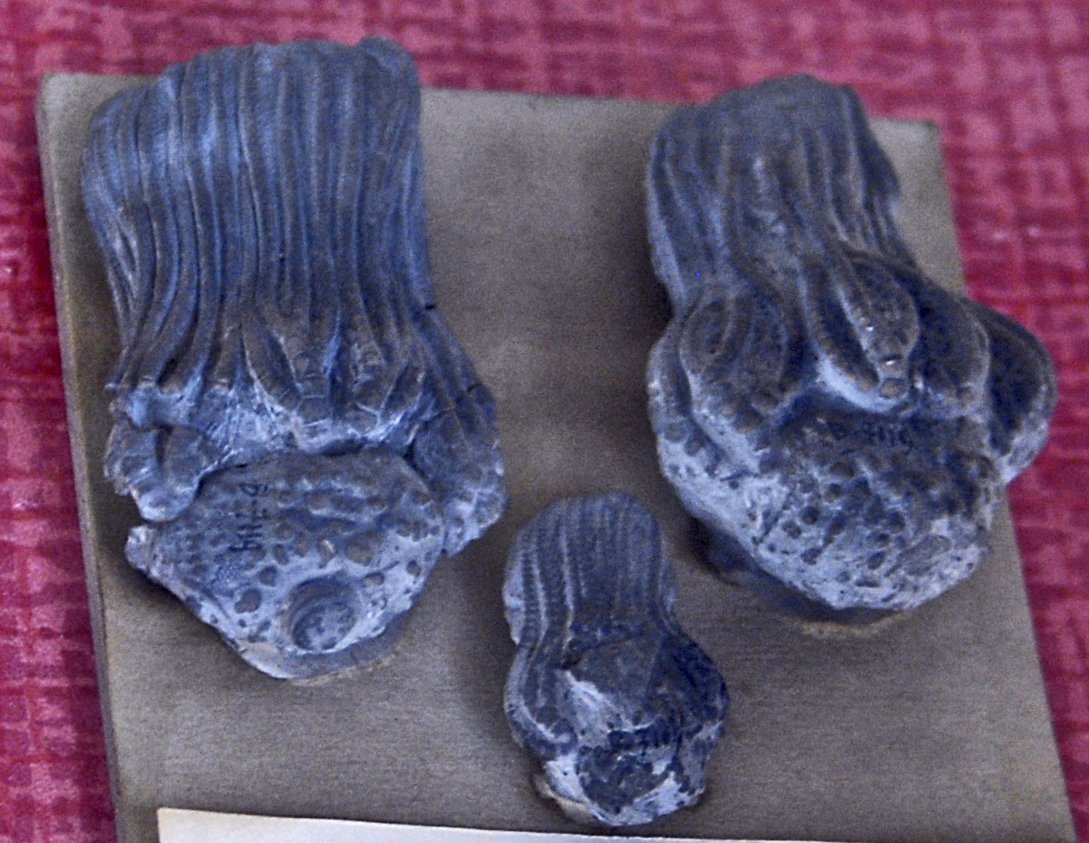
- Three fossilized calyces of the Devonian-Permian crinoid ("sea lily") Platycrinites
  †Platycrinites
- †Platycrinus
- †Platylichas
- †Platyrachella
  - †Platyrachella ballardi
  - †Platyrachella macbridei
- †Platyschisma
  - †Platyschisma barrisi
  - †Platyschisma depressa
  - †Platyschisma laudoni – type locality for species
- †Platystrophia
  - †Platystrophia biforata
- †Plectatrypa
- †Plectodina
  - †Plectodina aculeata
- †Plectodonta
  - †Plectodonta produla
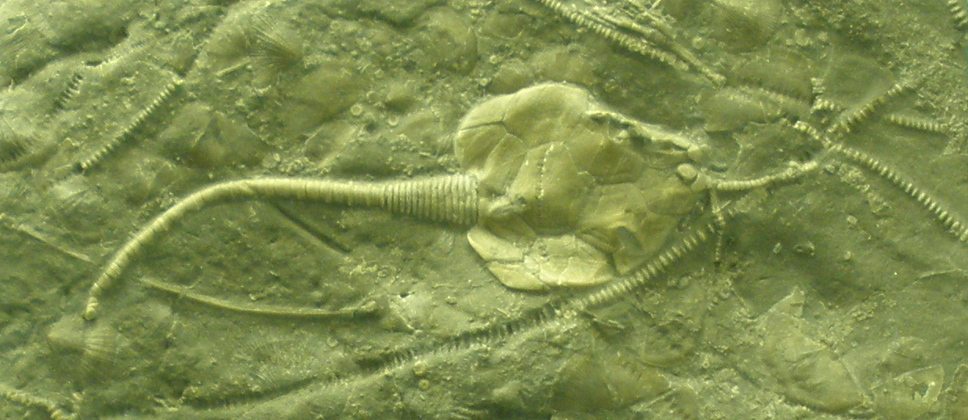
- Fossil of the Late Ordovician cystoid echinoderm Pleurocystites
  †Pleurocystites
  - †Pleurocystites beckeri
  - †Pleurocystites filitextus – tentative report
  - †Pleurocystites strimplei
- Pleurotomaria – tentative report
  - †Pleurotomaria verticillata
- †Plicochonetes
- †Plicostricklandia
- †Podolithus
- †Poleumita
- †Polusocrinus
  - †Polusocrinus rosa
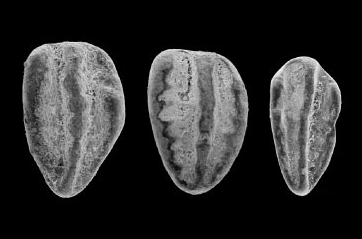
- Various conodont elements of Polygnathus
  †Polygnathus
  - †Polygnathus decorosus
  - †Polygnathus intermedius
  - †Polygnathus parawebbi
  - †Polygnathus xylus
- †Polyplacognathus
  - †Polyplacognathus ramosus
- †Polytryphocycloides
- †Polytylites
  - †Polytylites wilsoni
- †Porcellia
  - †Porcellia crassinoda
  - †Porcellia obliquinoda
  - †Porcellia rectinoda – type locality for species
- †Porocrinus
  - †Porocrinus crassus
  - †Porocrinus fayettensis
  - †Porocrinus pentagonius
- †Porpites
- †Posidonia
- †Praecupulocrinus
  - †Praecupulocrinus conjugans
- †Praenucula – tentative report
- †Praewaagenoconcha
  - †Praewaagenoconcha speciosa
- †Prasopora
- †Prasoporina
- †Pregazacrinus
  - †Pregazacrinus hemisphericus
- †Primitia
  - †Primitia gibbera
  - †Primitia spinata
- †Primitiella
  - †Primitiella bellevuensis
  - †Primitiella carlei
  - †Primitiella constricta
  - †Primitiella milleri
  - †Primitiella plattevillensis
- †Primitiopsis – tentative report
  - †Primitiopsis bella
- †Primitopsis – tentative report
  - †Primitopsis bella
- †Priscella
- †Probillingsites
- †Productella
  - †Productella belanskii
  - †Productella camerata
  - †Productella fragilis
  - †Productella iowa
  - †Productella linnensis
  - †Productella perplana
  - †Productella rugatula
  - †Productella sericea
  - †Productella subaculeata
  - †Productella subalata
  - †Productella thomasi
- †Productus
  - †Productus arcuatus
  - †Productus ovatus
  - †Productus sedaliensis
- †Proetides
  - †Proetides insignis
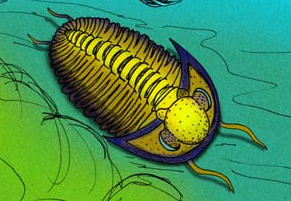
- Restoration of the Silurian trilobite Proetus
  †Proetus
  - †Proetus channahonensis – or unidentified comparable form
- †Promexyele
  - †Promexyele peyeri
- †Prospira
  - †Prospira greenockensis – or unidentified related form
  - †Prospira legrandensis
- †Protacrocrinus
- †Protatrypa
- †Protaxocrinus
- †Protoleptostrophia
  - †Protoleptostrophia fragilis
- †Protomegastrophia
- †Protometgastrophia
- †Protoniella
  - †Protoniella parva
- †Protoscolex
- †Pseudoammodiscus
- †Pseudoatrypa
  - †Pseudoatrypa bentonensis
  - †Pseudoatrypa blackhawkensis
  - †Pseudoatrypa boyeri – or unidentified comparable form
  - †Pseudoatrypa bremerensis
  - †Pseudoatrypa devoniana
  - †Pseudoatrypa minor
  - †Pseudoatrypa percrassa
  - †Pseudoatrypa rotunda
  - †Pseudoatrypa rugatula
- †Pseudobelodina – tentative report
- †Pseudoconocardium
- †Pseudoglomospira
- †Pseudopalmula
  - †Pseudopalmula palmuloides
- †Pseudoplagiothyra
  - †Pseudoplagiothyra praecursor
- †Pseudozygopleura
- †Pseudulrichia
  - †Pseudulrichia simplex
- †Pterinea
- †Ptychophyllum
- †Ptychopleurella
  - †Ptychopleurella bouchardi – or unidentified comparable form
- †Ptychopteria
  - †Ptychopteria chemungensis
- †Ptyctodopsis – type locality for genus
  - †Ptyctodopsis menzeli – type locality for species
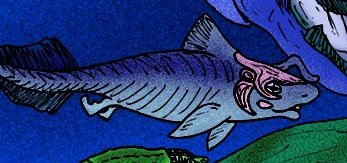
- Life restoration of the Late Devonian placoderm fish Ptyctodus
  †Ptyctodus
- †Pugnoides
  - †Pugnoides calvini
  - †Pugnoides ottumwa
- †Punctaparchites
  - †Punctaparchites rugosus
  - †Punctaparchites splendens
- †Punctospirifer
  - †Punctospirifer solidirostris
- †Pycnostylus
- †Pyramiblastus
  - †Pyramiblastus fusiformis – type locality for species
- †Pyrgocystis

== Q ==
- †Quasibollia
  - †Quasibollia ridicula
- †Quienquecaudex
  - †Quienquecaudex springeri

== R ==
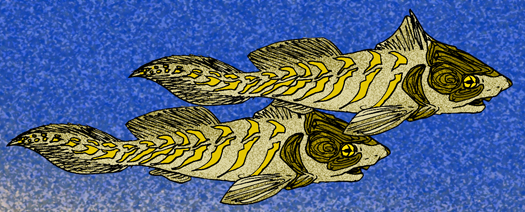
Life restoration of the Middle Devonian placoderm fish Rhamphodopsis

- †Raphistomina
- †Raymondatia
  - †Raymondatia goniglypta
  - †Raymondatia gonigplyta
- †Raymondiata
  - †Raymondiata goniglypta
- †Resserella
- †Retichonetes
  - †Retichonetes brandonensis
- †Reticularia
  - †Reticularia cooperensis
- †Retispira
  - †Retispira bilabiatus
  - †Retispira deflectus
  - †Retispira exilis
  - †Retispira perelegans
  - †Retispira type locality for species Kues & Batten 2001 – informal
- †Rhaphanocrinus
- †Rhaphistomina
- †Rhineoderma
  - †Rhineoderma dinglensis
- †Rhipidium
- †Rhipidomella
  - †Rhipidomella cuneata
  - †Rhipidomella dalyana – or unidentified comparable form
  - †Rhipidomella tenuicostata
  - †Rhipidomella thiemei
- †Rhodocrinites
- †Rhombopora
- †Rhynchodus
- †Rhynchopora
  - †Rhynchopora pustulosa
  - †Rhynchopora rowleyi
- †Rhynchotrema
- †Rhynchotreta
- †Rhyssochonetes
  - †Rhyssochonetes bellarugosis
- †Rigidella
- †Ripidiorhynchus
  - †Ripidiorhynchus cedarensis
- †Rugosochonetes
  - †Rugosochonetes multicastatus

== S ==
- †Saccelatia
  - †Saccelatia angularis
  - †Saccelatia arcuamuralis
  - †Saccelatia arrecta
  - †Saccelatia bullata
  - †Saccelatia cletifera
- †Sanguinolites
- †Scaphelasma
- †Schellwienella
  - †Schellwienella crenulicostata
  - †Schellwienella inaequalis
  - †Schellwienella inflata
  - †Schellwienella planumbona
- †Schizoblastus
  - †Schizoblastus roemeri
- †Schizodus
  - †Schizodus sedaliensis
  - †Schizodus trigonalis
- †Schizophoria
  - †Schizophoria amanaensis
  - †Schizophoria athabaskensis – or unidentified related form
  - †Schizophoria athabaskiensis – or unidentified related form
  - †Schizophoria chouteauensis
  - †Schizophoria dorsata
  - †Schizophoria floydensis
  - †Schizophoria floydia
  - †Schizophoria impressa
  - †Schizophoria iowensis
  - †Schizophoria landoni
  - †Schizophoria lata
  - †Schizophoria laudoni
  - †Schizophoria macfarlanei
  - †Schizophoria macfarlanii
  - †Schizophoria minor
  - †Schizophoria multistriata
  - †Schizophoria subelliptica
- †Schmidtella
  - †Schmidtella affinis
  - †Schmidtella brevis
  - †Schmidtella lacunosa
  - †Schmidtella latimarginata
- †Schuchertella
  - †Schuchertella acutistriata
  - †Schuchertella altirostris
  - †Schuchertella humboldtensis
  - †Schuchertella iowensis
  - †Schuchertella nodocostata
  - †Schuchertella parva
  - †Schuchertella pectiniformis
- †Scofielda
  - †Scofielda bilateralis
- †Scofieldia
  - †Scofieldia bilateralis
- †Scutellum
  - †Scutellum depressum
  - †Scutellum thomasi
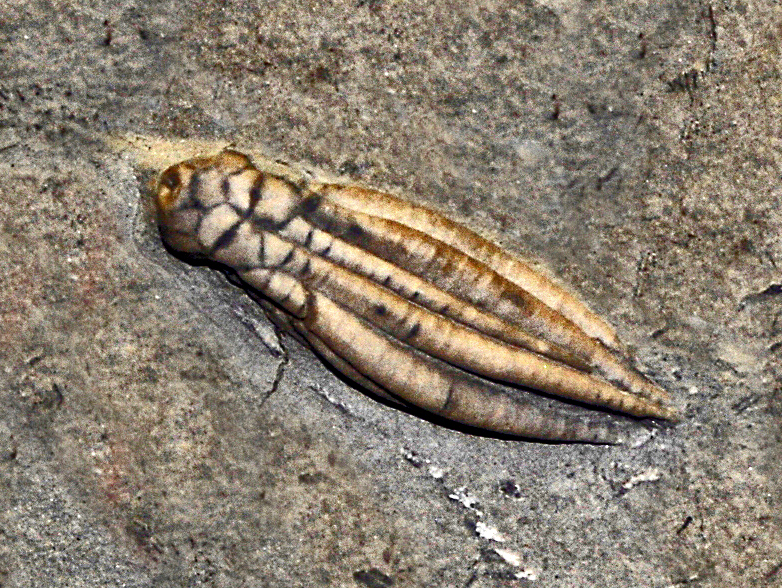
- Fossilized calyx of the Carboniferous crinoid ("sea lily") Scytalocrinus
  †Scytalocrinus
- †Selenella
  - †Selenella pediculus
- †Semitextularia
  - †Semitextularia thomasi
- †Septemchiton
  - †Septemchiton iowaensis
  - †Septemchiton iowensis
- †Septopora
- †Serpulospira
  - †Serpulospira paradoxus – type locality for species
- †Setigerites
- †Shumardella
- †Sieberella – tentative report
  - †Sieberella insolita
- †Sievertsia
- †Sigournea – type locality for genus
  - †Sigournea multidentata – type locality for species
- †Similodonta
  - †Similodonta obliqua
- †Simulodonta
  - †Simulodonta obliqua
- †Sinuites
  - †Sinuites subcompressa
- †Siphonocrinus
  - †Siphonocrinus nobilis
- †Skenidioides – tentative report
- †Skenidium
  - †Skenidium independense
- †Smithiphyllum
  - †Smithiphyllum belanskii
- †Sowerbyella
- †Spathella
- †Sphaerirhynchia
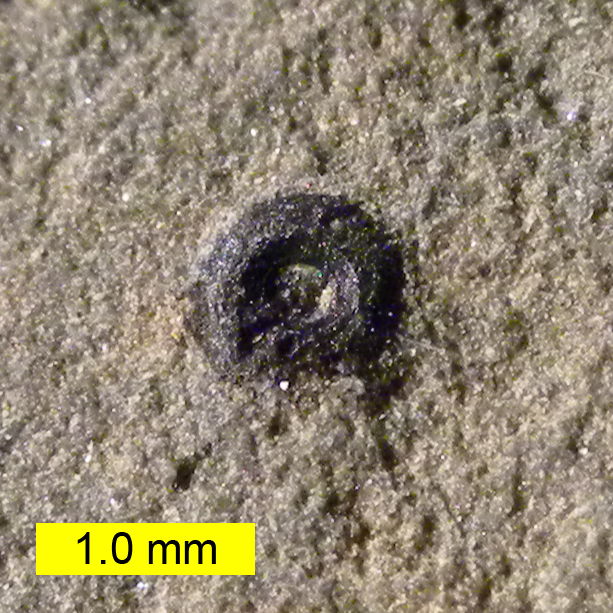
- Fossilized holdfast of the Cambrian-Carboniferous conulariid Sphenothallus
  †Sphenothallus
- †Spinatrypa
  - †Spinatrypa aspera
  - †Spinatrypa augusticostata – or unidentified comparable form
  - †Spinatrypa bellula
  - †Spinatrypa borealis
  - †Spinatrypa hystrix
  - †Spinatrypa mascula
  - †Spinatrypa occidentalis
  - †Spinatrypa planosulcata
  - †Spinatrypa rockfordensis
  - †Spinatrypa trulla
- †Spinatrypina
  - †Spinatrypina angusticostata – or unidentified comparable form
  - †Spinatrypina edmundsi
- †Spinocarinifera
  - †Spinocarinifera arcuata
  - †Spinocarinifera arcuatus
- †Spinocyrtia
  - †Spinocyrtia alta
  - †Spinocyrtia ballardi
  - †Spinocyrtia capax
  - †Spinocyrtia cedarensis
  - †Spinocyrtia corvirostra
  - †Spinocyrtia curvirostra
  - †Spinocyrtia cyrtiformis
  - †Spinocyrtia cyrtinaformis
  - †Spinocyrtia iowensis
  - †Spinocyrtia macbridei
  - †Spinocyrtia pulchra
  - †Spinocyrtia westerensis
- †Spinulicosta
  - †Spinulicosta spinulicosta
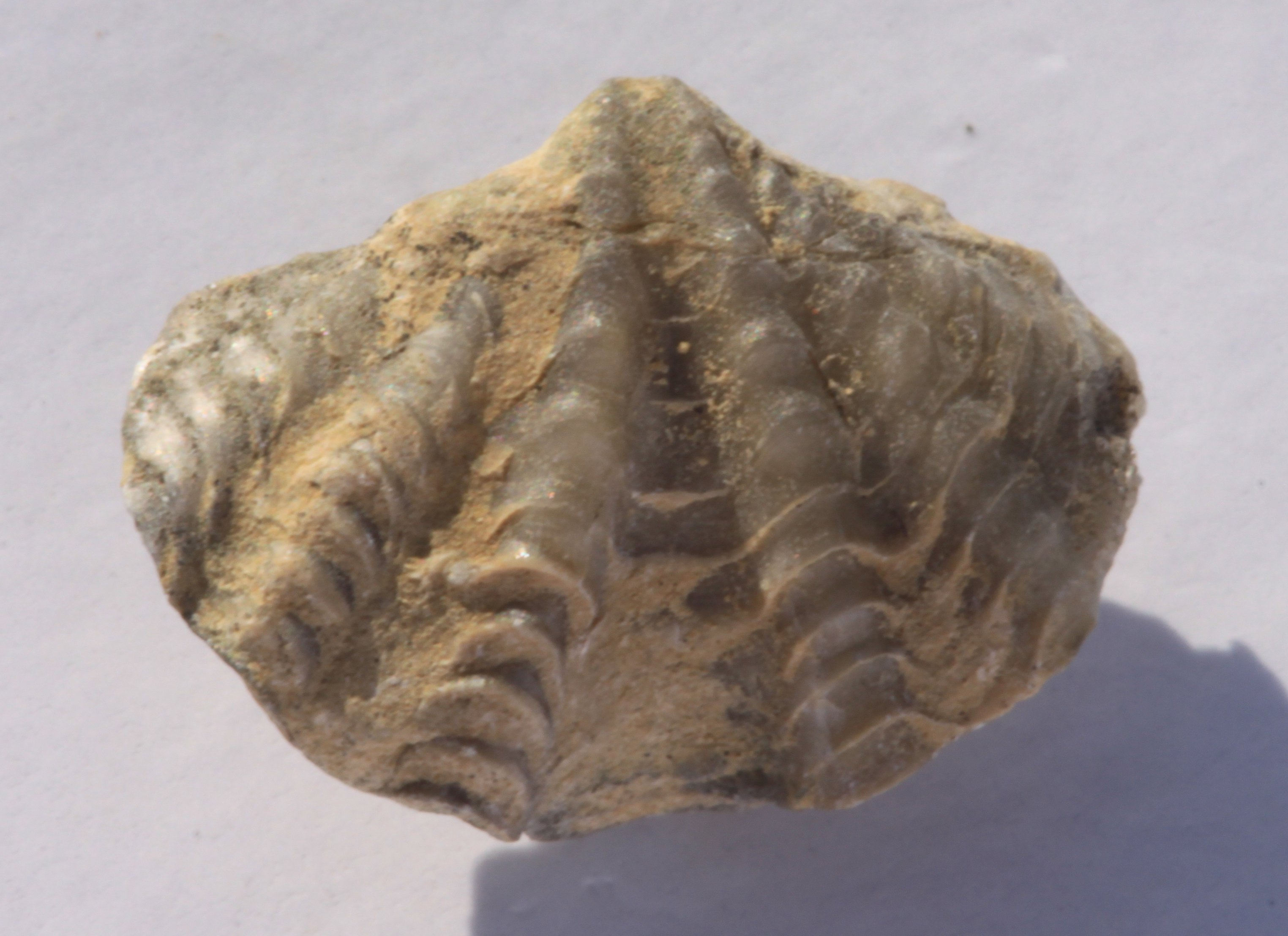
- Fossilized shell of the Late Ordovician-Late Triassic brachiopod Spirifer
  †Spirifer
  - †Spirifer biplicoides
  - †Spirifer forbesi
  - †Spirifer gregeri
  - †Spirifer legrandensis
  - †Spirifer louisianensis
  - †Spirifer marshallensis
  - †Spirifer missouriensis
  - †Spirifer orestes
  - †Spirifer platynotus
  - †Spirifer stratiformis
- †Spiriferina
  - †Spiriferina solidirostris
  - †Spiriferina solidirostrus
  - †Spiriferina subtexta
- †Spirinella
- Spirorbis
- †Spyroceras
- †Stachyodes
  - †Stachyodes costulata
- †Stainbrookia
  - †Stainbrookia infera
- †Staufferella
  - †Staufferella falcata
- †Stegocoelia
  - †Stegocoelia quadricincta – type locality for species
- †Stenopareia
  - †Stenopareia slocomi – or unidentified comparable form
- †Stenopareiea
- †Stephanocrinus
- †Stereostylus
  - †Stereostylus aages – type locality for species
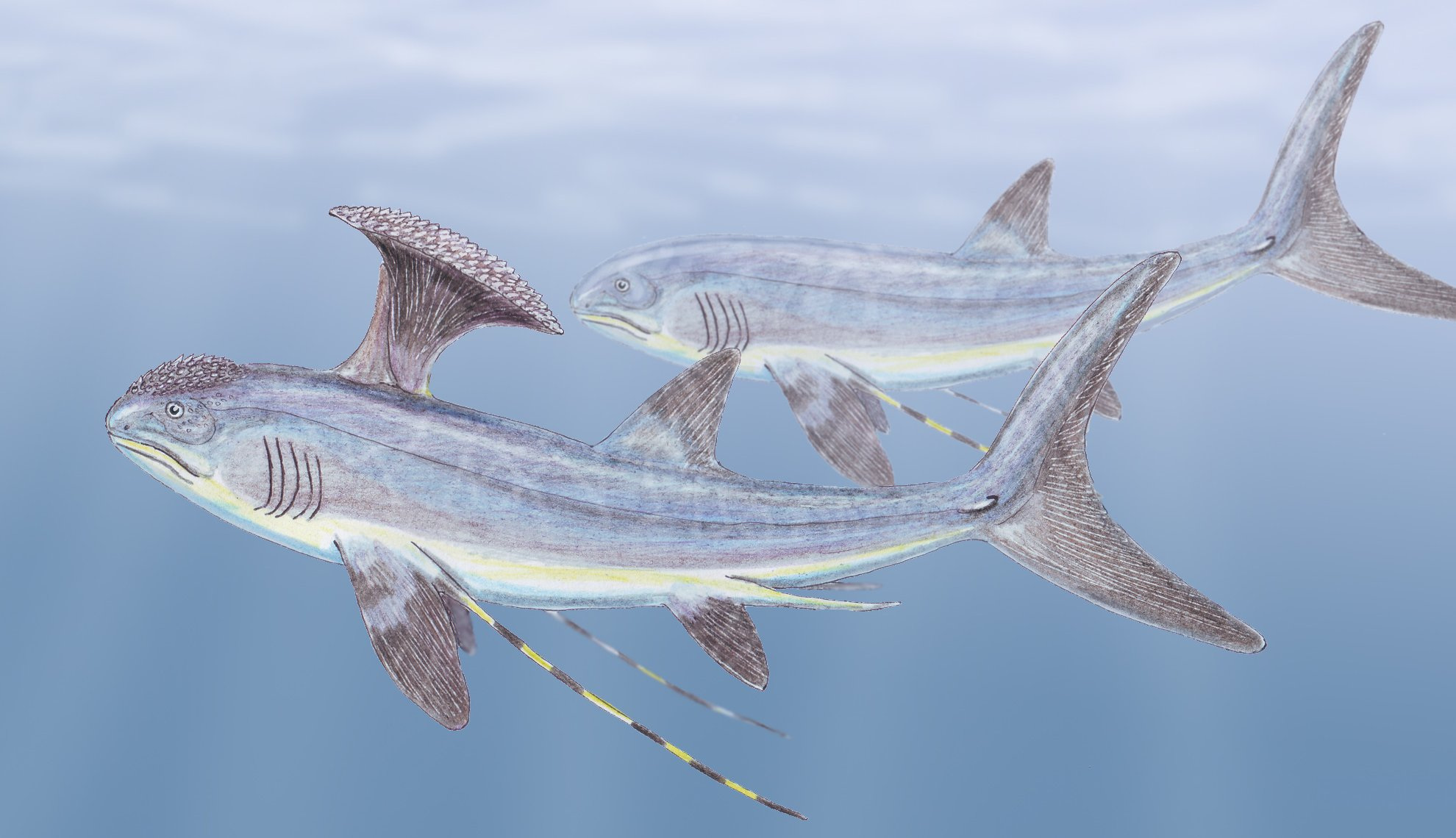
- Life restorations of a male (foreground) and female (background) of the Late Devonian-Carboniferous Chimaera relative Stethacanthus
  †Stethacanthus
  - †Stethacanthus depressus
  - †Stethacanthus erectus
- †Stictopora
- †Stictostroma
  - †Stictostroma ordinarium
- †Straparollus
  - †Straparollus ammon
  - †Straparollus argutus – type locality for species
  - †Straparollus cyclostomus
  - †Straparollus macromphalus
- †Streptelasma
  - †Streptelasma trilobatum – or unidentified comparable form
- †Streptis
- †Streptognathodus
  - †Streptognathodus delicatulus – type locality for species
  - †Streptognathodus symmetricus – type locality for species
- †Streptorhynchus
  - †Streptorhynchus tenuicostatum
- †Striatochonetes
  - †Striatochonetes buchananensis
  - †Striatochonetes schucherti
- †Striatopora
  - †Striatopora iowensis
- †Stricklandia
  - †Stricklandia laevis
  - †Stricklandia lens
- †Striispirifer
- †Strimplecrinus
- †Strobilocystites
- †Stromatopora
- †Strophalosia
- †Strophodonta
  - †Strophodonta umbonata
- †Stropholosia
  - †Stropholosia littletonensis
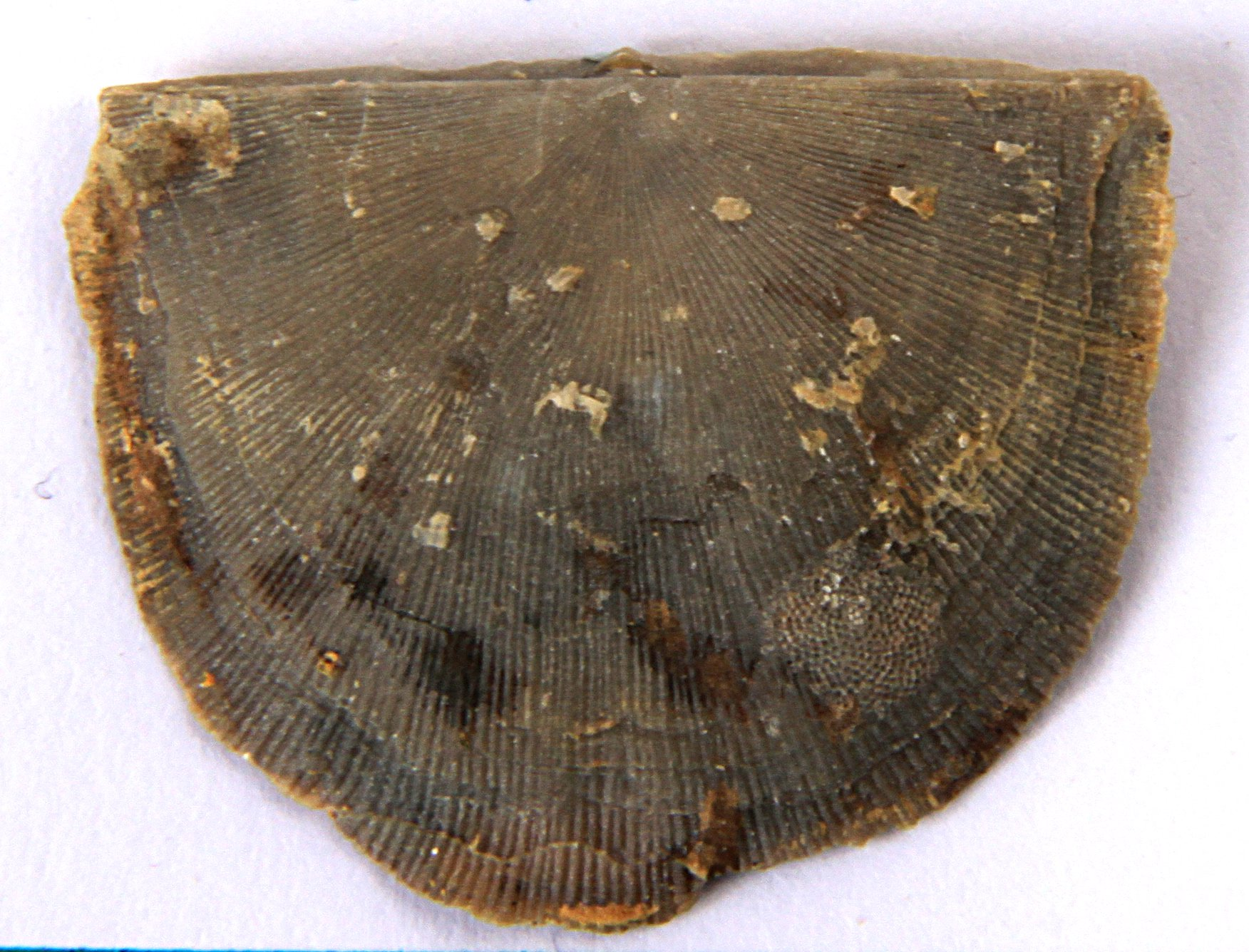
- Fossilized shell of the Ordovician-Silurian brachiopod Strophomena
  †Strophomena
  - †Strophomena abnormalis
  - †Strophomena biplacata
  - †Strophomena cedarensis
  - †Strophomena cicatricosa
  - †Strophomena costata
  - †Strophomena dorsata
  - †Strophomena erratica
  - †Strophomena halli
  - †Strophomena iowensis
  - †Strophomena linderi
  - †Strophomena littleonensis
  - †Strophomena littletonensis
  - †Strophomena masonensis
  - †Strophomena mineolaensis
  - †Strophomena nortoni
  - †Strophomena parva
  - †Strophomena perarcuata
  - †Strophomena planodorsata
  - †Strophomena plicata
  - †Strophomena quadratella
  - †Strophomena randalia
  - †Strophomena reticulata
  - †Strophomena scottensis
  - †Strophomena solonensis
  - †Strophomena subdemissa
  - †Strophomena thomasi
  - †Strophomena trilobata – type locality for species
  - †Strophomena unbonata
  - †Strophomena vera
- †Strophonella
- †Strophonelloides
  - †Strophonelloides reversa
- †Strophostylus
  - †Strophostylus bivolve
- †Stylonema – tentative report
- †Sublobalocrinus
  - †Sublobalocrinus kasseri
- †Sulcatostrophia
  - †Sulcatostrophia camerata
  - †Sulcatostrophia euglyphea
- †Sygcaulocrinus
  - †Sygcaulocrinus typus
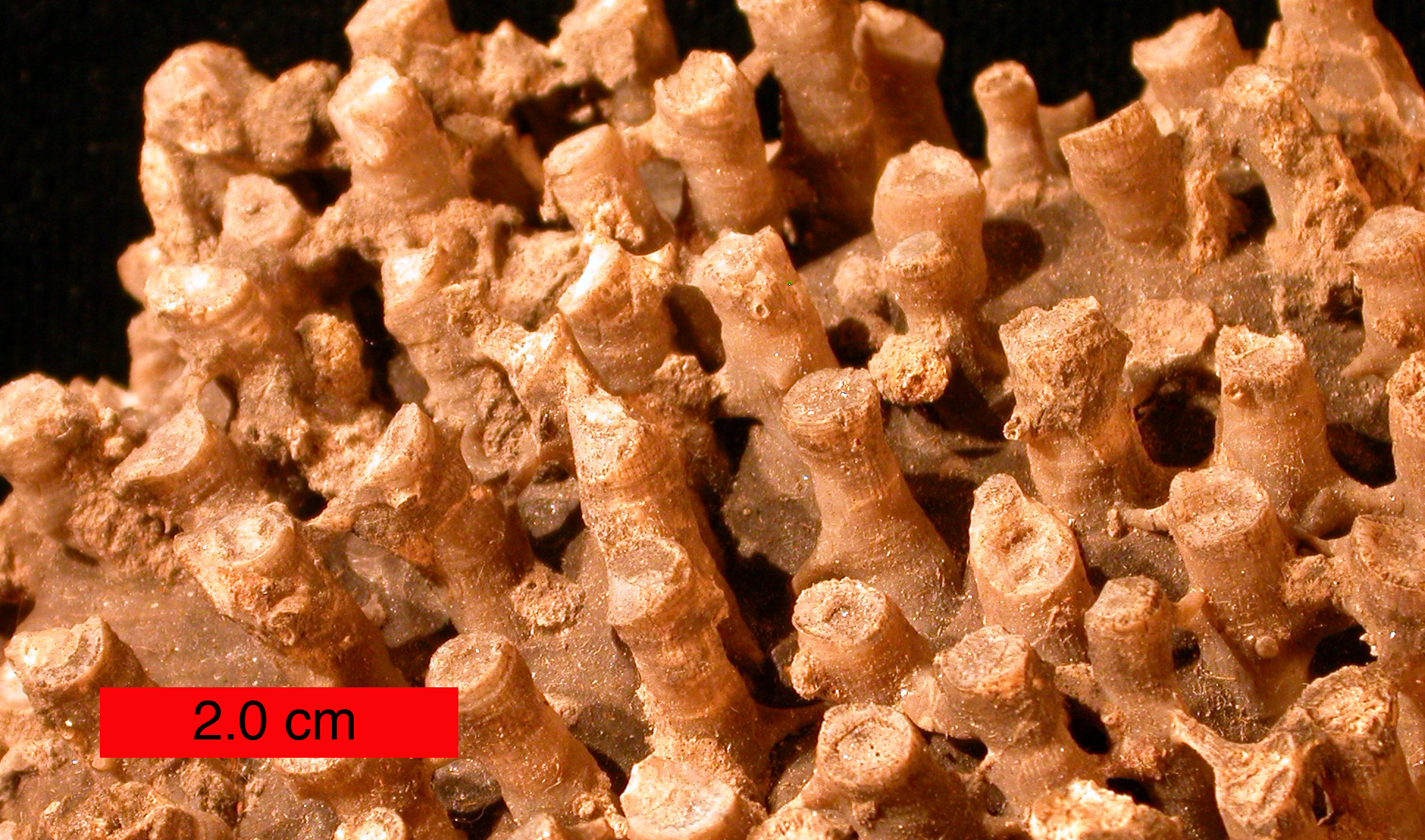
- Fossil of the Devonian tabulate coral Syringopora
  †Syringopora
- †Syringostroma – tentative report
  - †Syringostroma confertum
- †Syringothyris
  - †Syringothyris halli
  - †Syringothyris hannibalensis
  - †Syringothyris newarkensis

== T ==
- †Tabulophyllum
  - †Tabulophyllum buccinum – type locality for species
  - †Tabulophyllum curtum – type locality for species
  - †Tabulophyllum ehlersi
  - †Tabulophyllum ellipticum
  - †Tabulophyllum expansum
  - †Tabulophyllum levorsoni – type locality for species
  - †Tabulophyllum longum
  - †Tabulophyllum magnum
  - †Tabulophyllum mutabile – type locality for species
  - †Tabulophyllum ponderosum
  - †Tabulophyllum rectum
  - †Tabulophyllum robustum
  - †Tabulophyllum rotundum
  - †Tabulophyllum solidum
- †Tanaocystis
  - †Tanaocystis type locality for species – informal
- †Tarphyphyllum
  - †Tarphyphyllum cylindricum – type locality for species
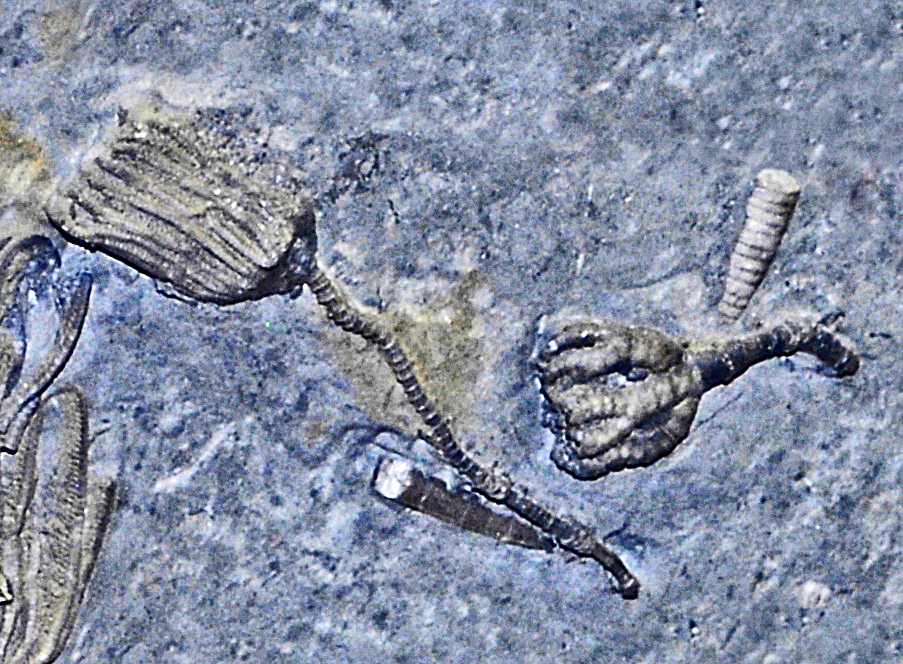
- Fossil of the Silurian-Carboniferous crinoid ("sea lily") Taxocrinus (right)
  †Taxocrinus
- †Tecnocyrtina
  - †Tecnocyrtina curvilineata
  - †Tecnocyrtina missouriensis
- †Tenticospirifer
  - †Tenticospirifer cyrtinaeformis
  - †Tenticospirifer cyrtinaformis
  - †Tenticospirifer shellrockensis
- †Tetradella
  - †Tetradella carinata
  - †Tetradella ellipsilira
  - †Tetradella septinoda
  - †Tetradella subquadrans
  - †Tetradella ulrichi
- †Teutonophon
  - †Teutonophon tangentialis
- †Thaerodonta
  - †Thaerodonta recedens
- †Thalamocrinus
- †Theleproktocrinus
  - †Theleproktocrinus davidsoni
- †Theodissa
  - †Theodissa hungerfordi
- †Theodossia
  - †Theodossia hungerfordi
- †Thomasaria
  - †Thomasaria altumbona
- †Thomasatia
  - †Thomasatia falcicosta
- †Thomasocrinus
  - †Thomasocrinus cylindrica
- †Timeischytes
- †Torynifer
- †Trachydomia
  - †Trachydomia variata
- †Tranodis
- †Trapezophyllum
- †Tremanotus
- †Trichinocrinus
- †Trigeria
- †Trimerella
- †Triplesia
- †Trochonema
- †Tropidodiscus
- †Trupetustroma
  - †Trupetustroma bassleri
  - †Trupetustroma hayense
- †Tubisalebra
- †Turbonopsis
  - †Turbonopsis hackberryensis
  - †Turbonopsis spiculatus – type locality for species
- †Tylothyris
  - †Tylothyris bimesialis
  - †Tylothyris inultilis
  - †Tylothyris megista
  - †Tylothyris mesacostalis
  - †Tylothyris rockfordensis
  - †Tylothyris subattenuatta
  - †Tylothyris subvaricosa
  - †Tylothyris sulcocostata

== U ==
- †Ulocrinus
- †Ulrichia
  - †Ulrichia saccula
- †Unispirifer
  - †Unispirifer minnewankensis – or unidentified comparable form
  - †Unispirifer platynotus

== V ==
- †Variatrypa
  - †Variatrypa arctica
  - †Variatrypa lineata
  - †Variatrypa rugatula
- †Verkhotomia – tentative report
  - †Verkhotomia calvini

== W ==
- †Waagenella
  - †Waagenella sowerbyi – tentative report
- †Warrenella
  - †Warrenella extensa
- †Warthia
- †Wellerella
- †Westerna
  - †Westerna gigantea
- †Whatcheeria – type locality for genus
  - †Whatcheeria deltae – type locality for species
- †Whidbornella
  - †Whidbornella lachrymosa
- †Whitfieldella
- †Winchellatia
  - †Winchellatia lansingensis
  - †Winchellatia longispina
  - †Winchellatia minnesotensis
- †Worthenia

== Y ==
- †Youngia

== Z ==
- †Zaphrenthis
  - †Zaphrenthis calceola
  - †Zaphrenthis cliffordana
- †Zygobolboides
  - †Zygobolboides calvini
  - †Zygobolboides grafensis
  - †Zygobolboides iowensis
  - †Zygobolboides thomasi
- †Zygospira
  - †Zygospira resupinata
