= List of the prehistoric life of Ohio =

This list of the prehistoric life of Ohio contains the various prehistoric life-forms whose fossilized remains have been reported from within the US state of Ohio.

== Precambrian ==
The Paleobiology Database records no known occurrences of Precambrian fossils in Ohio.

== Paleozoic ==
=== Selected Paleozoic taxa of Ohio ===
- †Achatella
- †Acidaspis
- †Acleistoceras – tentative report
- †Acutichiton – type locality for genus
- †Adamanterpeton – type locality for genus
  - †Adamanterpeton ohioensis – type locality for species
- †Aethaspis
- †Agnesia
- †Alethopteris
- †Ambedus – type locality for genus
- †Amphiscapha
- †Amplexopora
- †Annularia
  - †Annularia asteris
  - †Annularia radiata
  - †Annularia sphenophylloides
  - †Annularia stellata
- †Anthracodromeus
  - †Anthracodromeus longipes – type locality for species
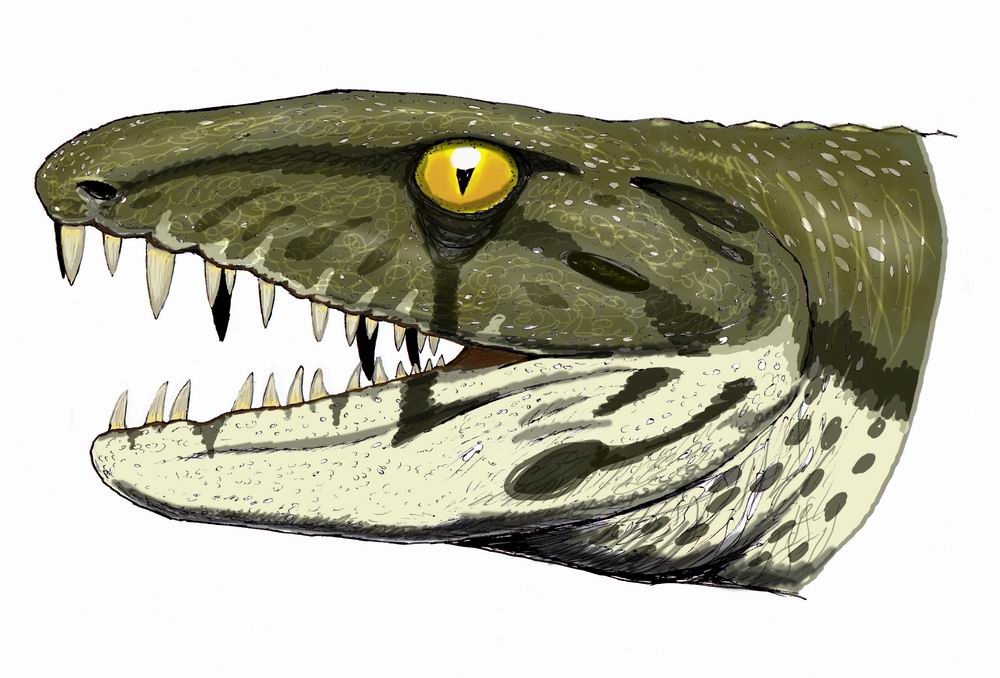
- Restoration of the face of the Carboniferous reptiliomorph Anthracosaurus
  †Anthracosaurus
- †Aphlebia
- †Archaeothyris
- †Arctinurus
- †Armenoceras
- †Artisia
- †Asterotheca
- †Athyris
- †Atrypa
  - †Atrypa reticularis
  - †Atrypa reticularus – report made of unidentified related form or using admittedly obsolete nomenclature
- †Augustoceras
- †Aulopora
  - †Aulopora microbuccinata
- †Aviculopecten
  - †Aviculopecten appalachianus – type locality for species
  - †Aviculopecten columbianus – type locality for species
  - †Aviculopecten coxanus
  - †Aviculopecten fasciculatus
  - †Aviculopecten occidentalis
  - †Aviculopecten winchelli
- †Baldwinonus
- †Bellerophon
  - †Bellerophon jeffersonensis
  - †Bellerophon spergensis
- †Bembexia
- †Bickmorites
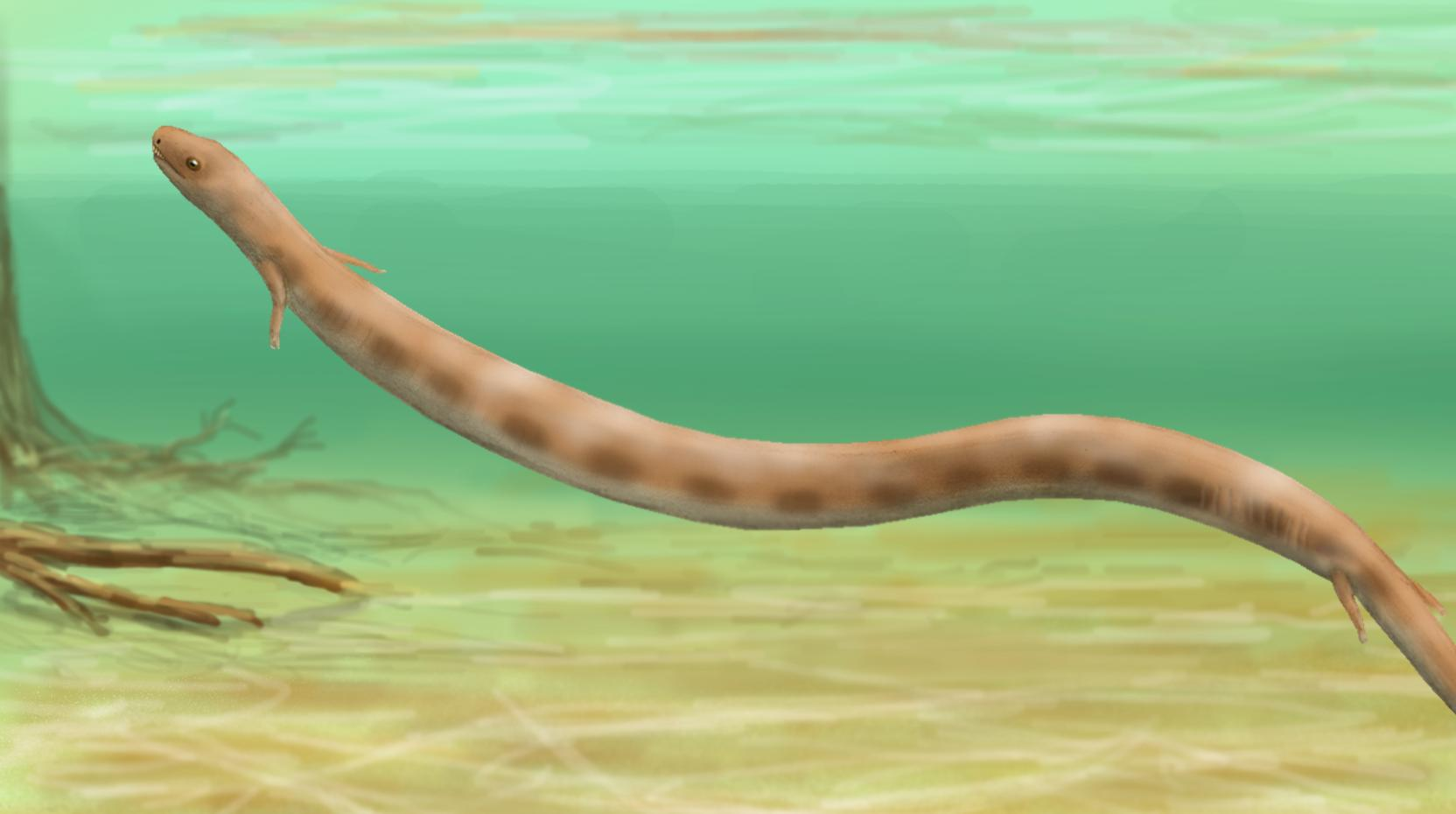
- Life restoration of the Carboniferous amphibian Brachydectes
  †Brachydectes – type locality for genus
  - †Brachydectes newberryi – type locality for species
- †Broiliellus
- †Calamites
  - †Calamites carinatus
  - †Calamites cisti
  - †Calamites suckowi
  - †Calamites suckowii
  - †Calamites undulatus
- †Callixylon
- †Camarotoechia
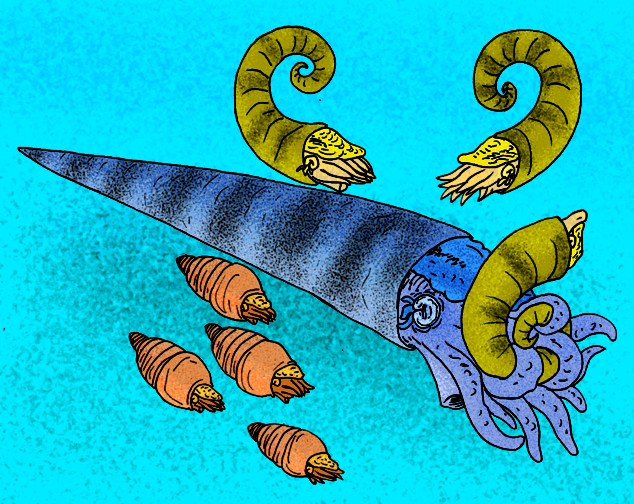
- Restoration of the Middle Ordovician-Silurian nautiloid cephalopod Cameroceras feeding on an Aphetoceras, while a quartet of Cyclostomiceras swim by
  †Cameroceras
- †Catenipora
- †Centroceras
- †Ceratocephala
- †Ceratopsis
- †Ceraurinus
- †Ceraurus
- †Chagrinia
- †Charactoceras
- †Chasmatopora
- †Chasmops
- †Chaunograptus
- †Chondrites
- †Chonetes
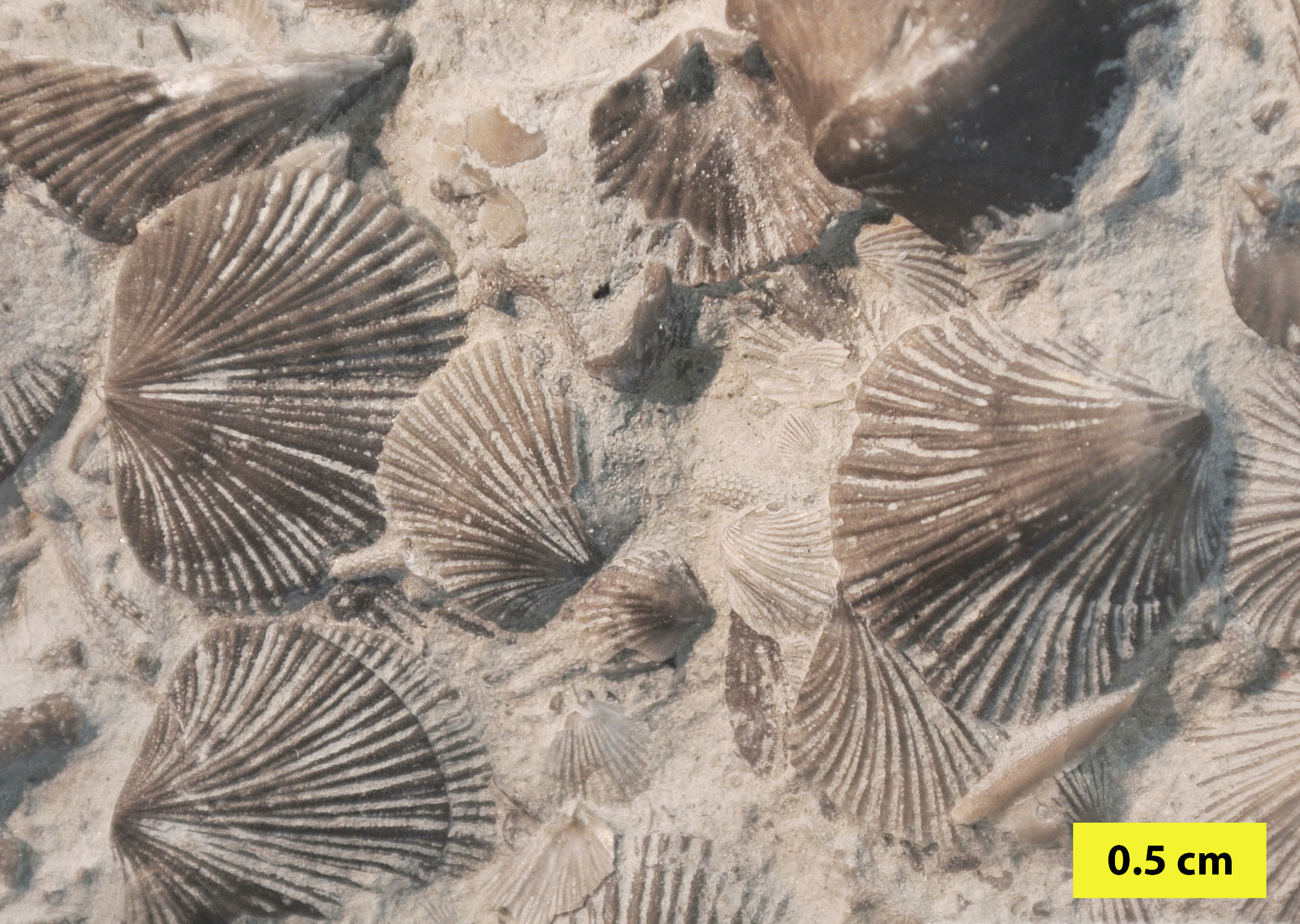
- Assemblage of fossilized shells of the Ordovician brachiopod Cincinnetina
  †Cincinnetina
  - †Cincinnetina meeki
  - †Cincinnetina multisecta
- †Cladochonus
- †Cladoselache
- †Clarkesvillia
- †Climacograptus
- †Coenites
- †Colosteus
- †Columnaria
  - †Columnaria calicina
- †Composita
  - †Composita subtilita
- †Conchidium
- †Constellaria
- †Cordaites
  - †Cordaites principalis – or unidentified comparable form
- †Cornulites
  - †Cornulites flexuosus
- Craniella
- †Crepipora
- †Ctenacanthus
- †Ctenerpeton
- †Ctenospondylus
- †Cyclonema
- †Cyclopteris
- †Cypricardinia
  - †Cypricardinia indenta
- †Cyrtolites
- †Cyrtospirifer
- †Cystodictya
- †Decadocrinus
- †Diceratosaurus
  - †Diceratosaurus brevirostris – type locality for species
- †Dictyonema
- †Dinichthys
  - †Dinichthys herzeri
- †Diploceraspis
- †Diplograptus
- Discina
- †Dolichopterus
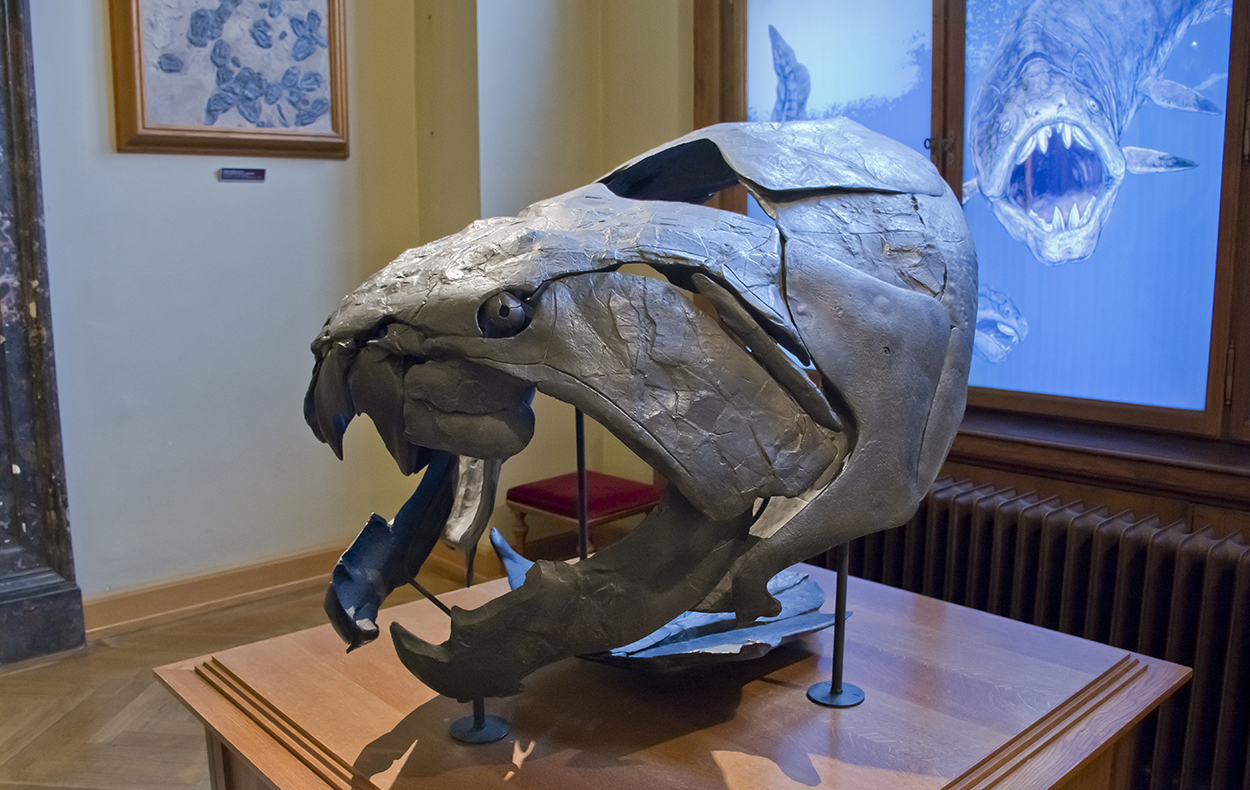
- Mounted skull of the Late Devonian placoderm fish Dunkleosteus
  †Dunkleosteus
- †Ecdyceras
- †Edmondia
- †Edon
- †Eldredgeops
  - †Eldredgeops rana
- †Elita
- †Elpe
- †Elrodoceras
- †Emmonsia
- †Endoceras
- †Erettopterus
- †Erpetosaurus
- †Eucalyptocrinites
- †Euomphalus
  - †Euomphalus planodorsatus
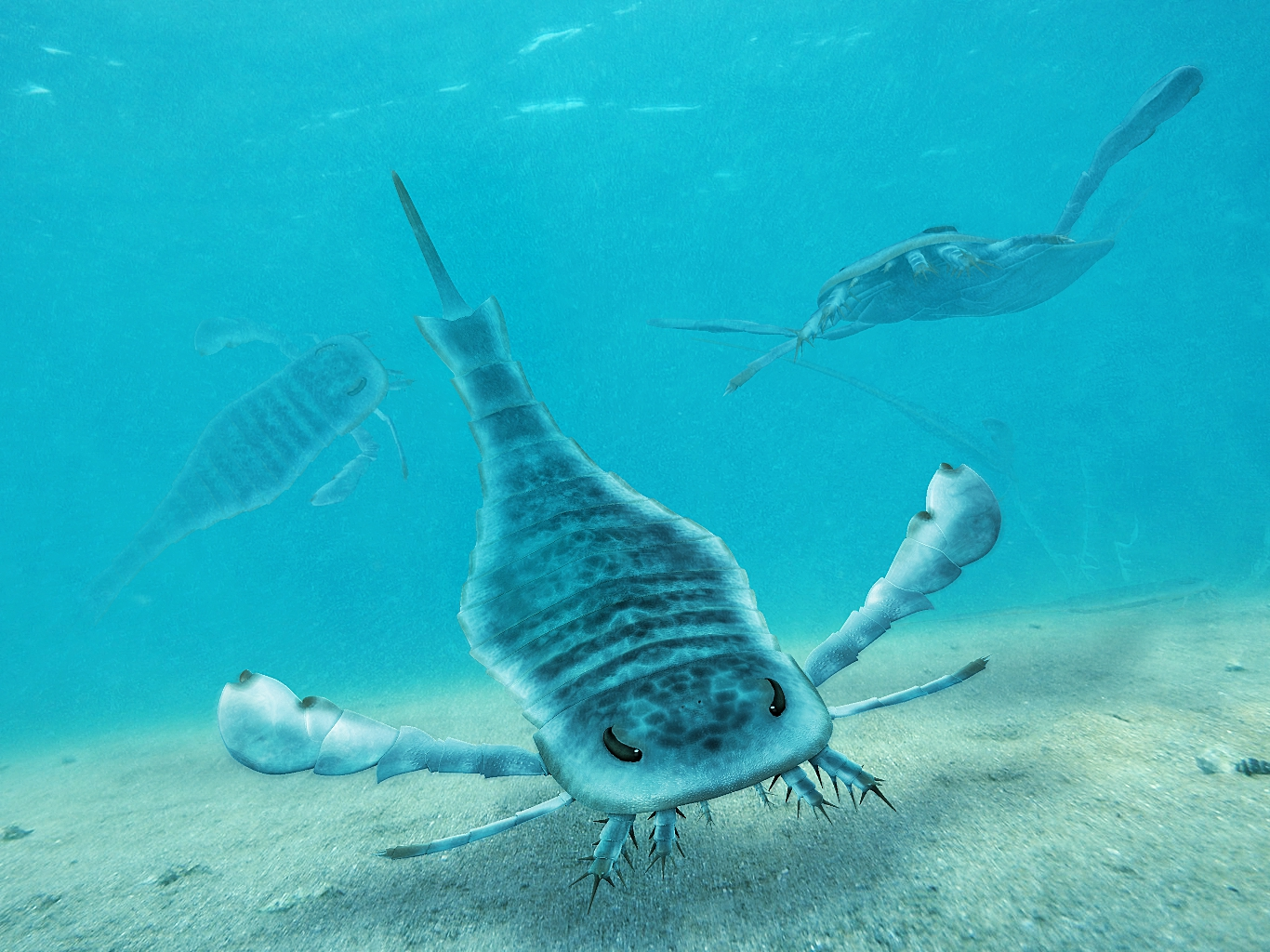
- Life restoration of Silurian eurypterid ("sea scorpion") Eurypterus
  †Eurypterus
  - †Eurypterus ornatus
- †Eusauropleura – type locality for genus
- †Faberia
- †Faberoceras
- †Favosites
  - †Favosites discoideus
  - †Favosites favosus
  - †Favosites hisingeri
  - †Favosites turbinatus
- †Fayettoceras
- †Fenestella
- †Flexicalymene
  - †Flexicalymene meeki
- †Foerstia
- †Fusulina
- †Gilbertsocrinus
- †Glyptocrinus
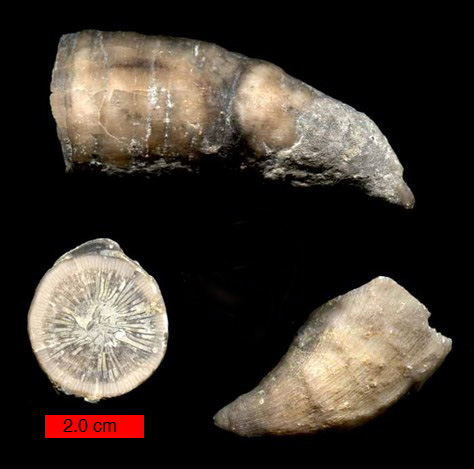
- Multiple views of a fossil of the Ordovician horn coral Grewingkia
  †Grewingkia
  - †Grewingkia rusticum
- †Hallopora
  - †Hallopora subnodosa
- †Halysites
- †Hamiltonella
- †Helcionopsis
- †Heliophyllum
  - †Heliophyllum halli
- †Helminthochiton
- †Hexagonaria
- †Hexameroceras
- †Hindia
- †Holopea
- †Holoptychus – or unidentified comparable form
- †Hyolithes
- †Icriodus
- †Iocrinus
- †Isodectes
- †Isonema
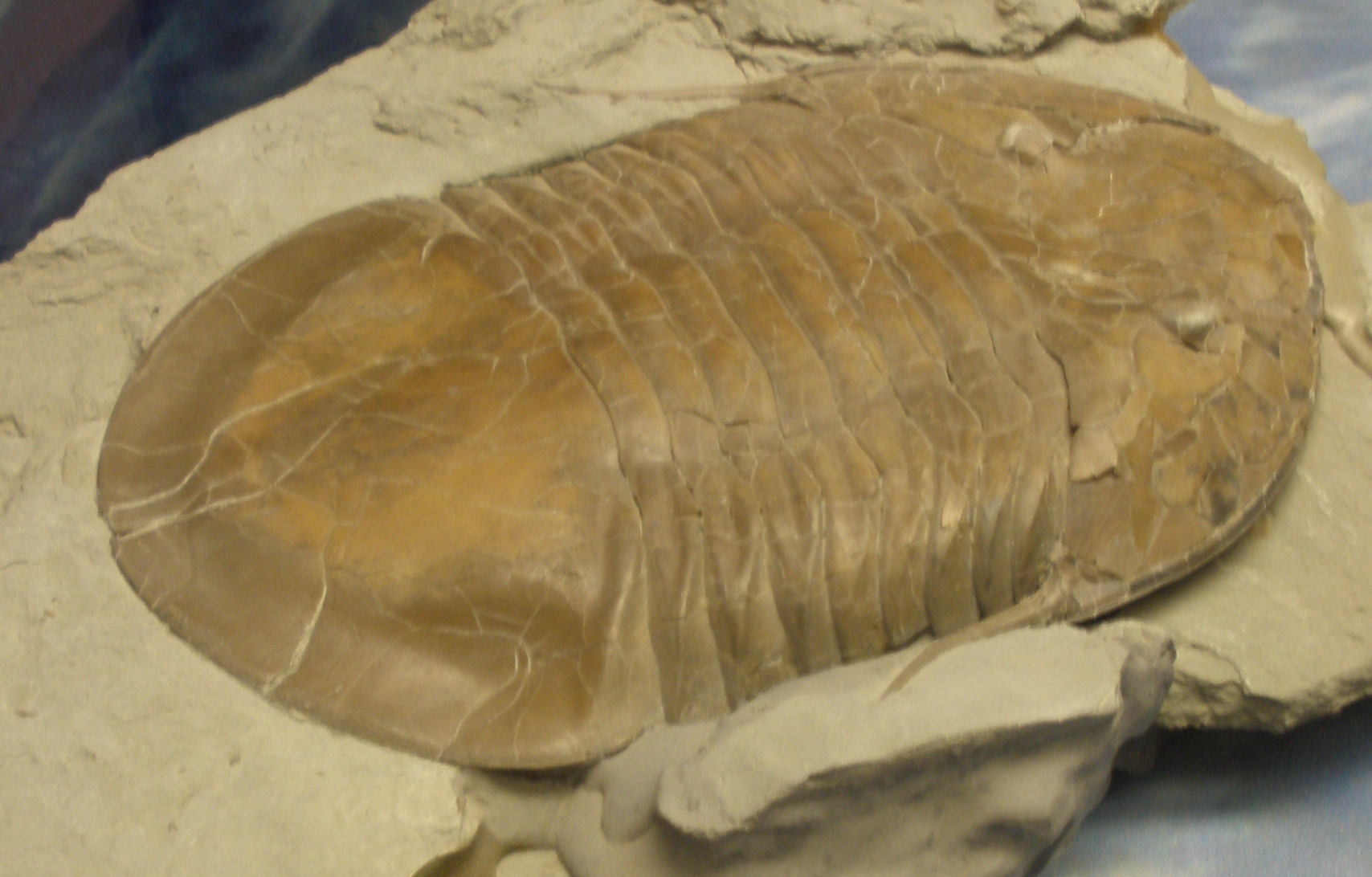
- Fossil of the Middle-Late Ordovician giant trilobite Isotelus.
  †Isotelus
  - †Isotelus maximus
- †Kindleoceras
- †Kionoceras
- †Kockelella
- †Lambeoceras
- †Leiosphaeridia
- †Lepidodendron
  - †Lepidodendron aculeatum
- Lingula
- †Liroceras – tentative report
- †Loxomma
  - †Loxomma lintonensis – type locality for species
- †Maelonoceras
- †Manitoulinoceras
- †Manticoceras
- †Marsupiocrinus
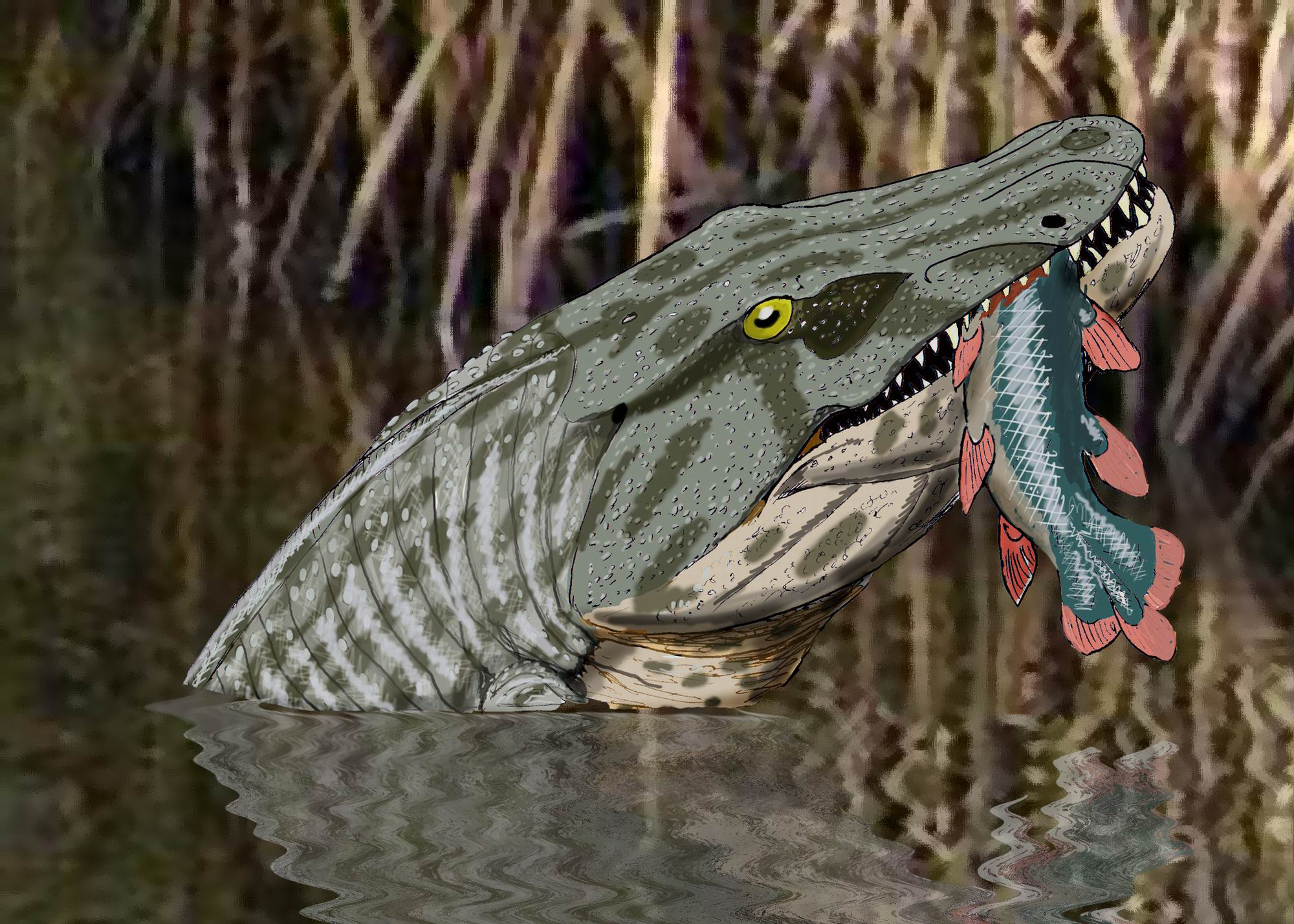
- Life restoration of the Carboniferous amphibian Megalocephalus
  †Megalocephalus – type locality for genus
  - †Megalocephalus lineolatus – type locality for species
- †Megalograptus
- †Metaxys
- †Michelinoceras
- Modiolus
- †Molgophis – type locality for genus
- †Mucrospirifer
  - †Mucrospirifer grabaui – or unidentified comparable form
  - †Mucrospirifer mucronatus
  - †Mucrospirifer prolificus
- †Murchisonia
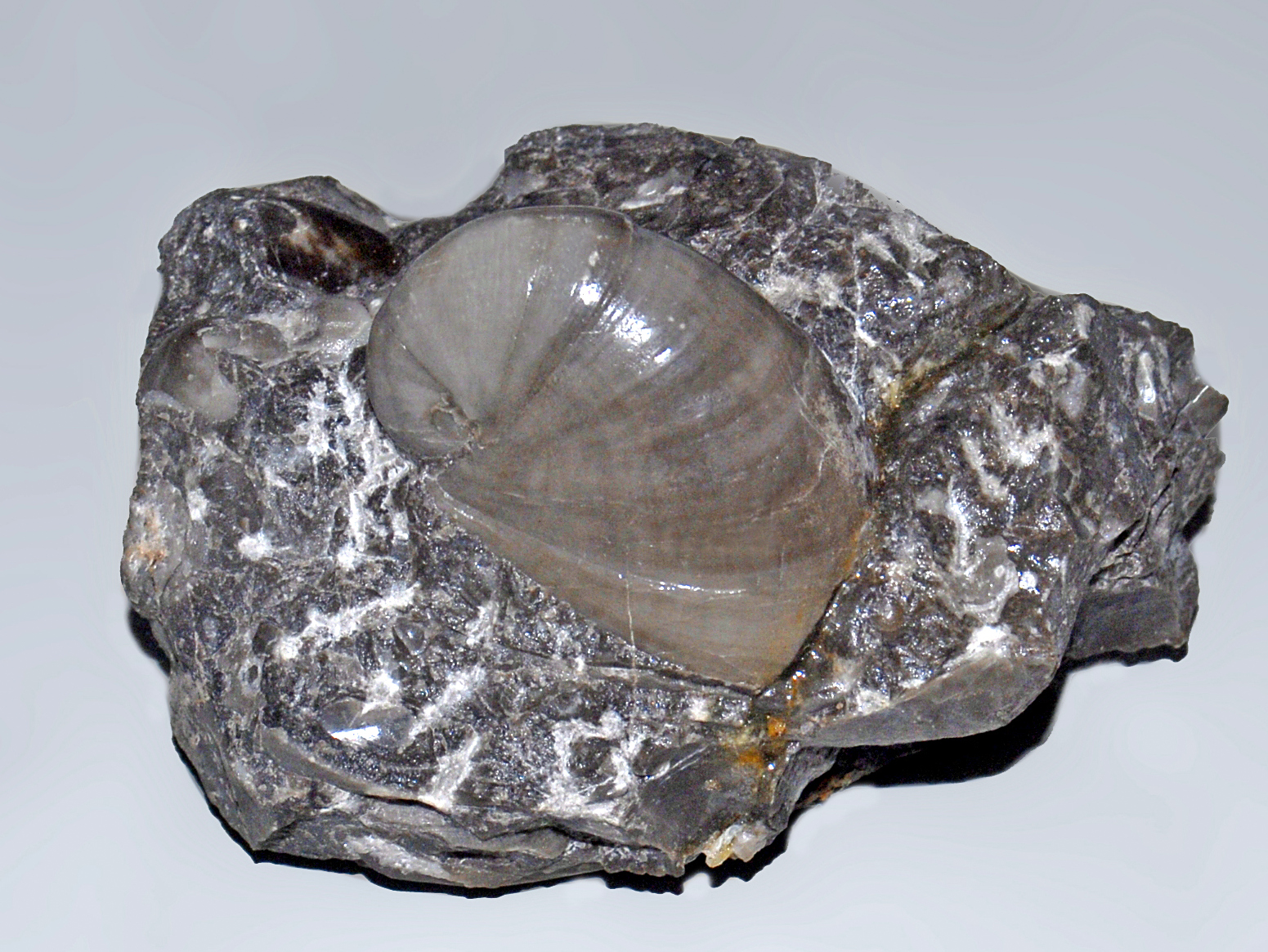
- Fossilized shell of the Early Devonian – Triassic sea snail Naticopsis
  †Naticopsis
  - †Naticopsis comperta
  - †Naticopsis levis
- †Neospirifer
  - †Neospirifer cameratus
  - †Neospirifer dunbari
- †Neuropteris
  - †Neuropteris heterophylla
  - †Neuropteris ovata
  - †Neuropteris scheuchzeri
- †Nodonema
- Nucula
- † Nyassa
- †Odonterpeton – type locality for genus
  - †Odonterpeton triangulare – type locality for species
- †Odontopleura
- †Oestocephalus – type locality for genus
  - †Oestocephalus amphiuminum – type locality for species
- †Olenoides
- †Oncoceras
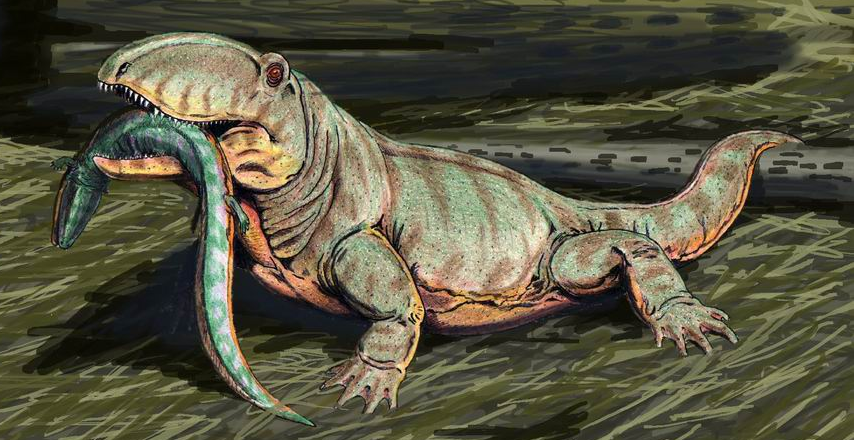
- Life restoration of the Carboniferous-Permian synapsid (mammal precursor) Ophiacodon
  †Ophiacodon
  - †Ophiacodon uniformis – or unidentified comparable form
- †Orthoceras
- †Oulodus
- †Ozarkodina
  - †Ozarkodina confluens
- †Paraspirifer
- †Pattersonia
- †Pecopteris
  - †Pecopteris arborescens
  - †Pecopteris hemitelioides
  - †Pecopteris unita
- †Pentamerus
- †Petalodus
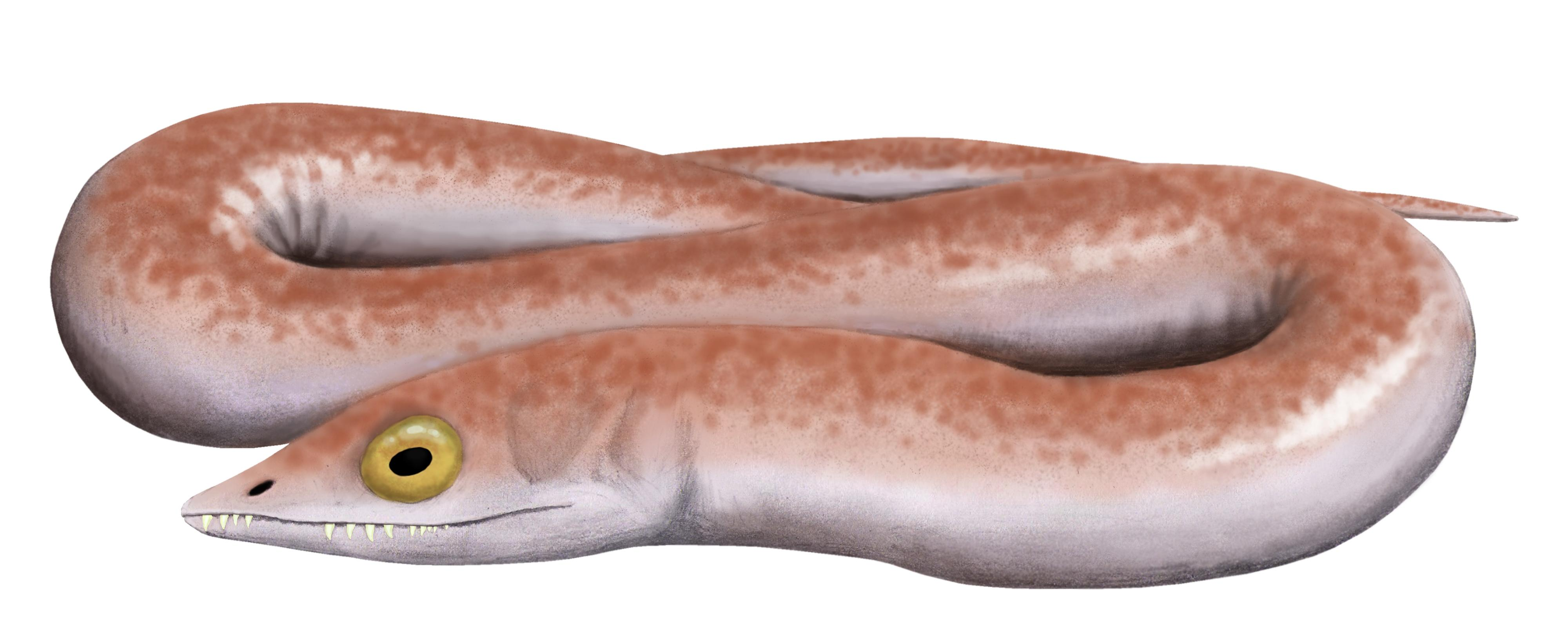
- Life restoration of the Carboniferous-Permian amphibian Phlegethontia.
  †Phlegethontia – type locality for genus
  - †Phlegethontia linearis – type locality for species
  - †Phlegethontia longissima – type locality for species
- †Phragmolites
  - †Phragmolites elegans – type locality for species
- †Phylloporina
- Pinna
- †Plaesiomys
- †Platyceras
  - †Platyceras bucculentum
  - †Platyceras carinatum
  - †Platyceras rarispinum
- †Platyrhinops – type locality for genus
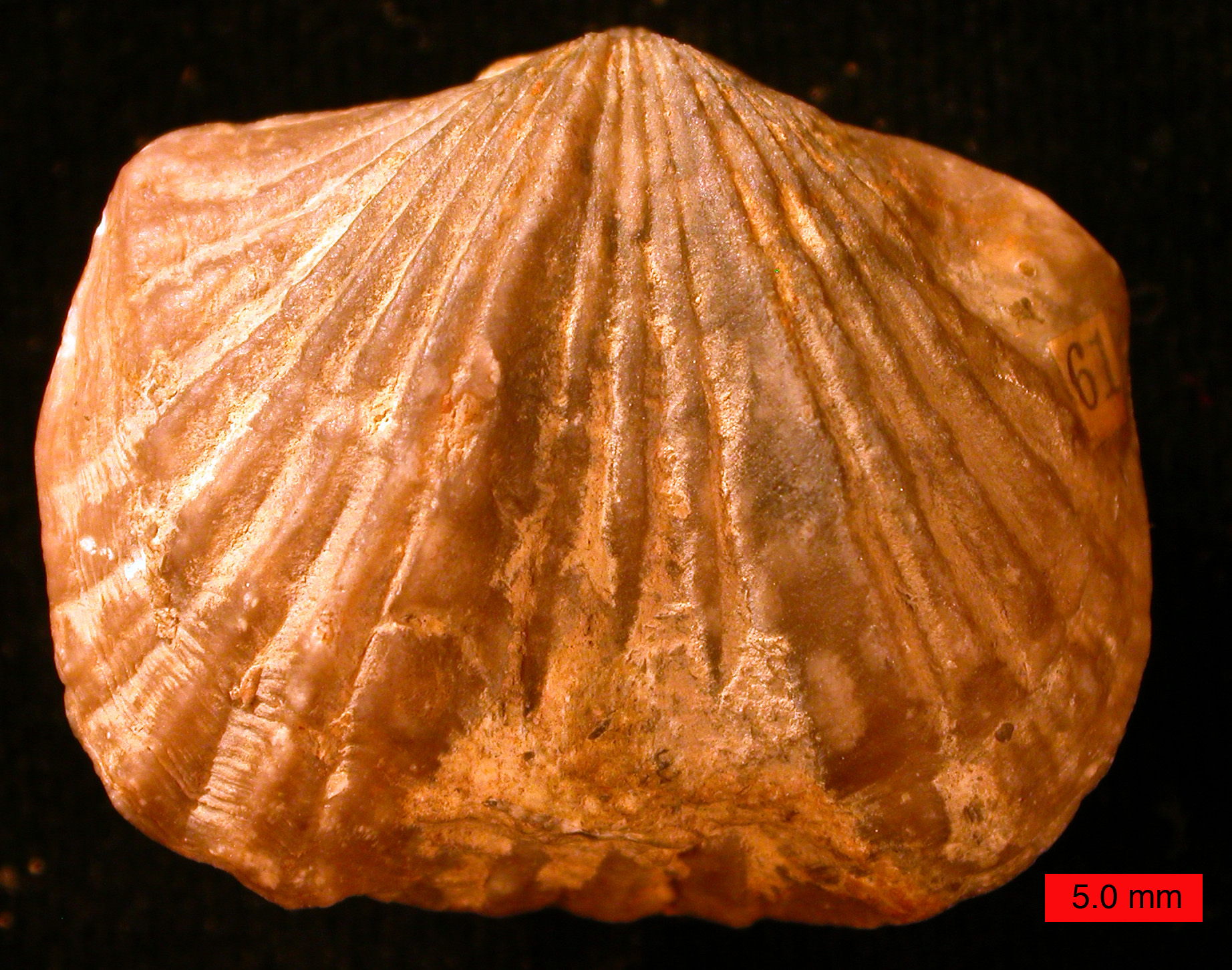
- Fossilized shell of the Middle Ordovician-Silurian brachiopod Platystrophia
  †Platystrophia
  - †Platystrophia acutilirata
  - †Platystrophia annieana
  - †Platystrophia clarksvillensis
  - †Platystrophia cypha
  - †Platystrophia moritura
- †Pleurodictyum
- †Pleuroptyx – type locality for genus
- †Pleurorthoceras
- †Poleumita
- †Polygnathus
  - †Polygnathus eiflius
  - †Polygnathus linguiformis
  - †Polygnathus pseudofoliatus
  - †Polygnathus xylus
- †Posidonia
- †Proetus
- †Protobalanus
- †Protosalvinia
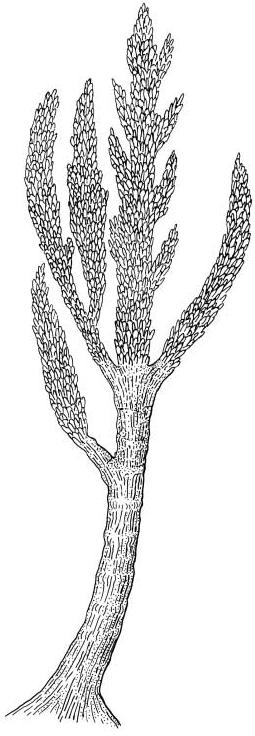
- Life restoration with a conifer-like body plan of the Silurian-Late Devonian tree-like probable fungus Prototaxites. John William Dawson (1888).
  †Prototaxites
- †Pterochiton
- †Pterotheca
- †Pterygotus
- †Ptyonius
  - †Ptyonius marshii – type locality for species
- †Pugnax
- †Reteocrinus
- †Rhizocorallium
- †Richmondoceras
- †Rusophycus
- †Samaropsis
- †Sauropleura – type locality for genus
  - †Sauropleura pectinata – type locality for species
- †Sigillaria
  - †Sigillaria brardii
  - †Sigillaria elegans
- †Similodonta – tentative report
- Solemya
- †Solenomorpha
- †Sowerbyella
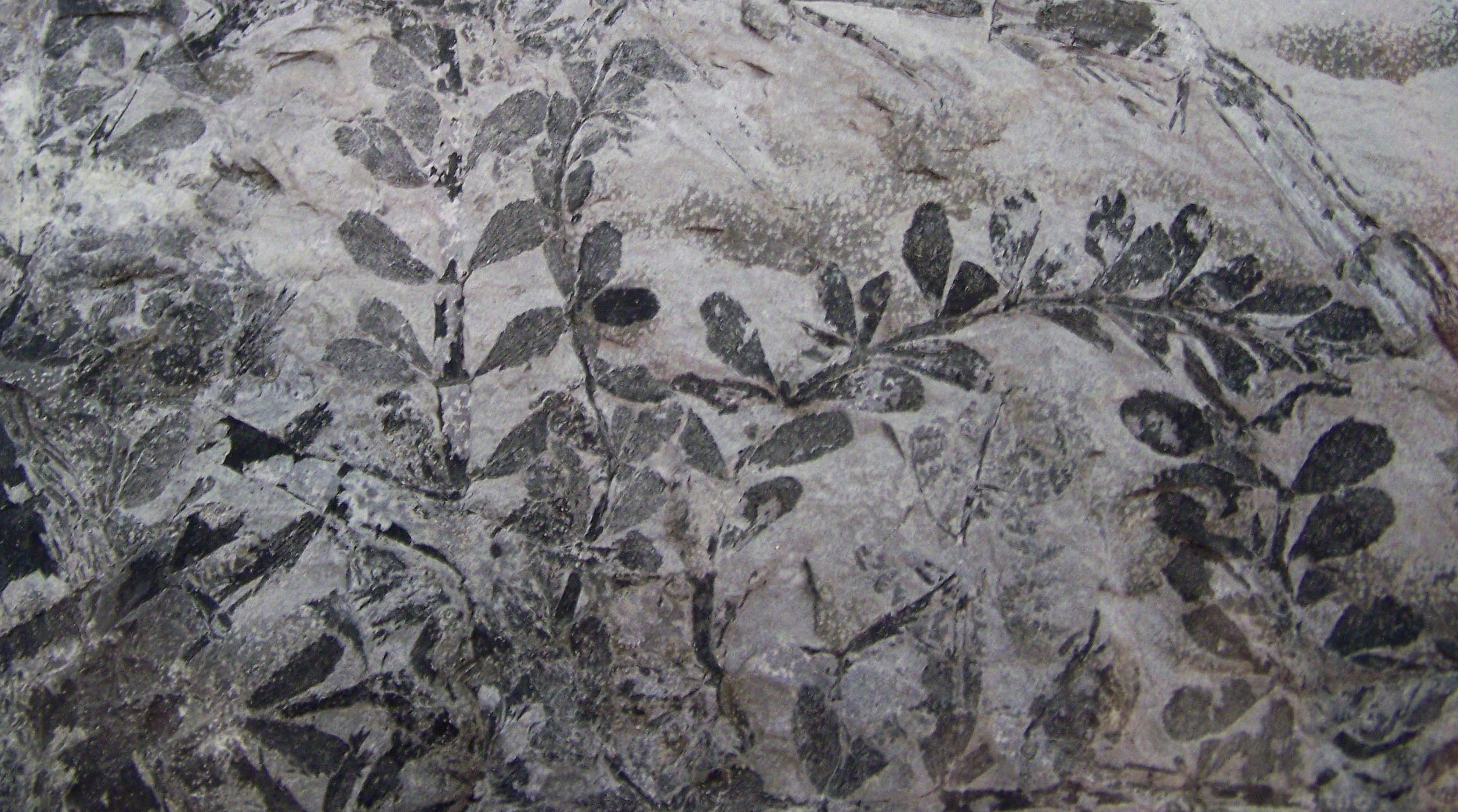
- Fossilized leaves and branches of the Devonian-Triassic horsetail relative Sphenophyllum
  †Sphenophyllum
  - †Sphenophyllum majus
  - †Sphenophyllum oblongifolium
- †Sphenopteris
  - †Sphenopteris elegans – or unidentified comparable form
- †Sphenothallus
- †Spirifer
  - †Spirifer opimus
- Spirorbis
- †Spyroceras
- †Stegops
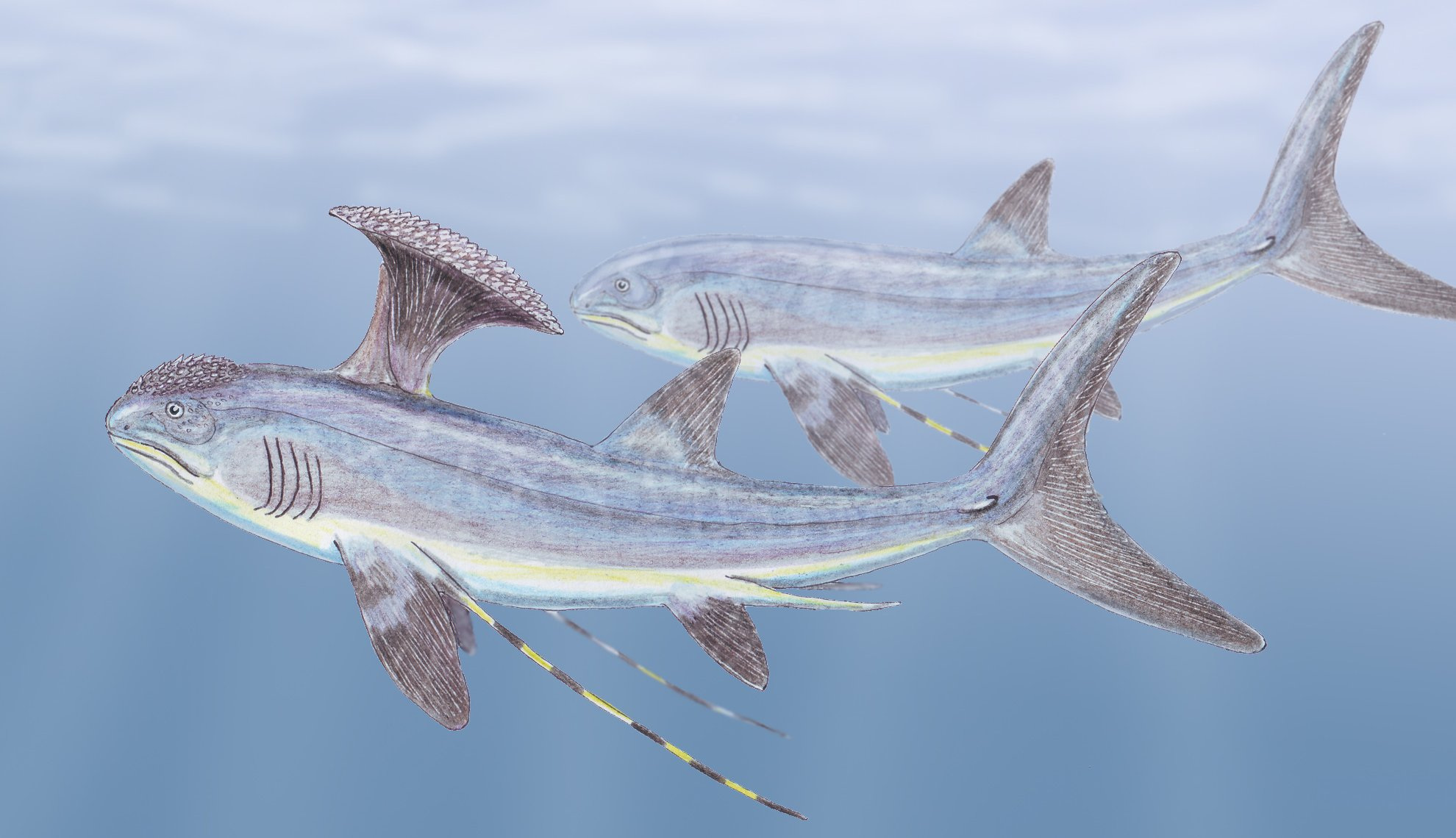
- Life restorations of a male (foreground) and female (background) of the Late Devonian-Carboniferous Chimaera relative Stethacanthus
  †Stethacanthus
  - †Stethacanthus altonensis
- †Stigmatella
- †Strophomena
  - †Strophomena concordensis
  - †Strophomena erratica
  - †Strophomena extenuata
  - †Strophomena neglecta
  - †Strophomena nutans
  - †Strophomena planumbona
  - †Strophomena sulcata
- †Stylonema
- †Subulites
- †Syntomopterus
- †Syringopora – tentative report
- †Teichichnus
- †Tentaculites
- †Tetradium
- †Tornoceras
- †Treptoceras
- †Triarthrus
- †Triendoceras – tentative report
- †Trocholites
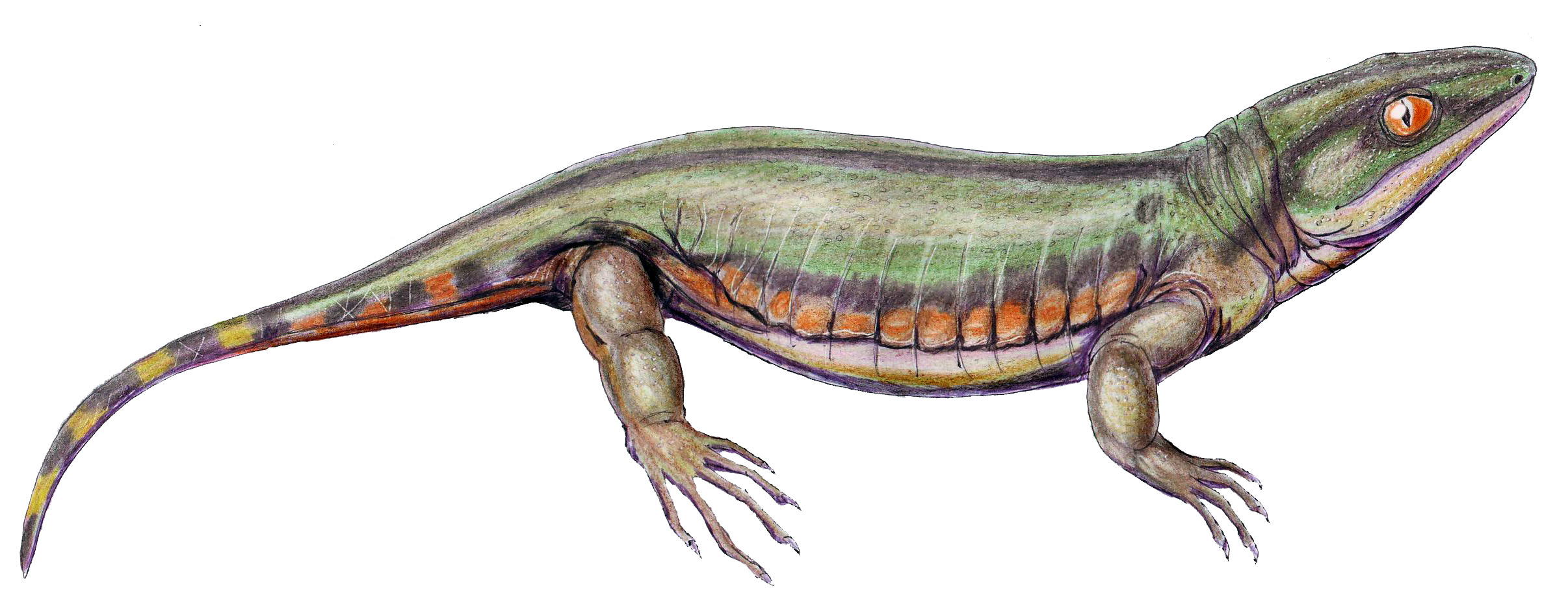
- Life restoration of the Carboniferous amphibian Tuditanus
  †Tuditanus – type locality for genus
  - †Tuditanus punctulatus – type locality for species
- †Urasterella
- †Vinella
- †Walchia
- †Westonoceras
- †Whiteavesia
- †Wilkingia
- †Worthenia
- †Wurmiella
  - †Wurmiella excavata
- †Xyloiulus
- †Zittelloceras
- †Zoophycos

== Mesozoic ==
The Paleobiology Database records no known occurrences of Mesozoic fossils in Ohio.

== Cenozoic ==
- Acella
  - †Acella haldermani
- Amnicola
- †Arctodus
  - †Arctodus simus
- †Bembidium
  - †Bembidium fragmentum – type locality for species
- Castor
  - †Castor canadensis
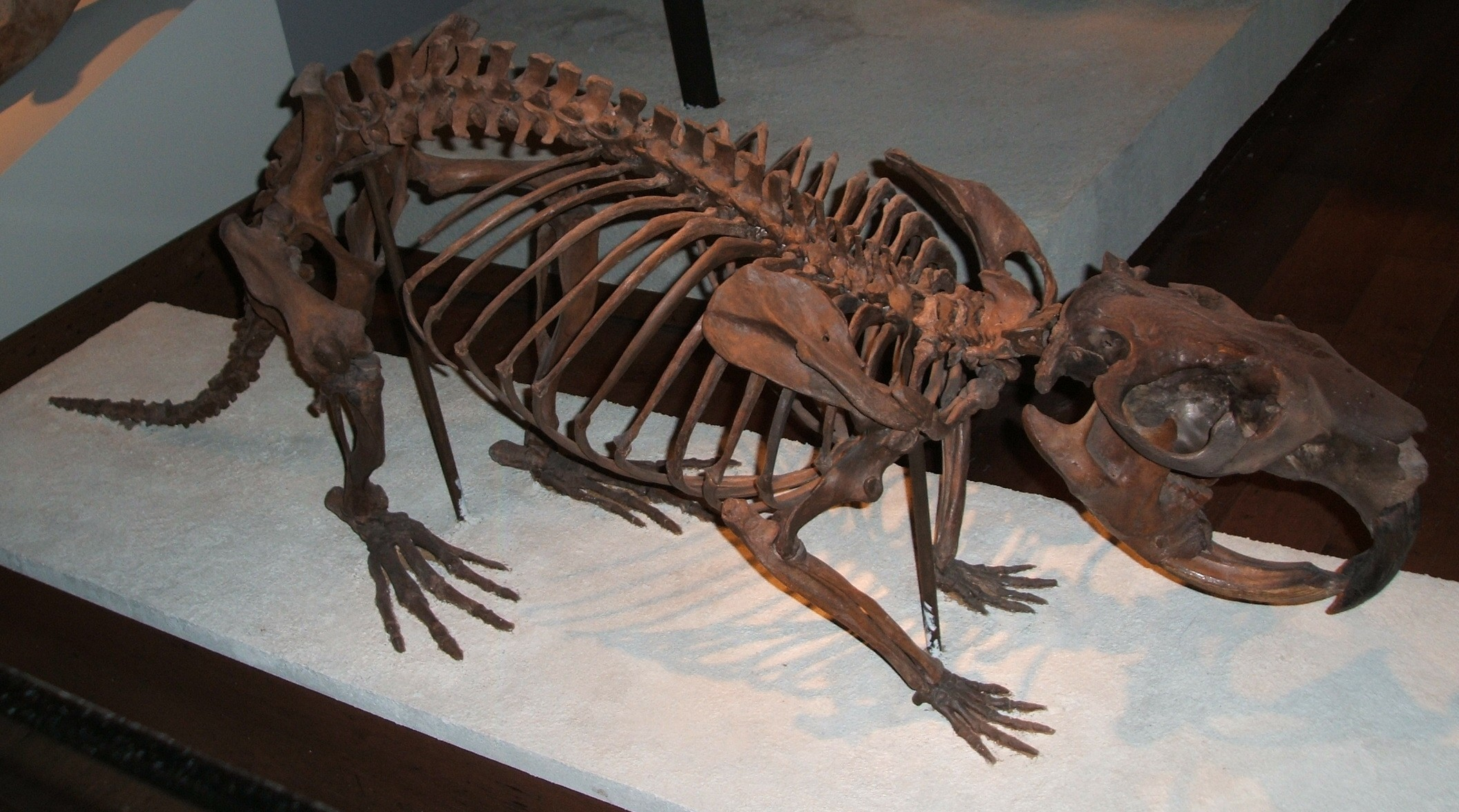
- Mounted fossilized skeleton of the Pliocene-Pleistocene giant beaver Castoroides
  †Castoroides
  - †Castoroides ohioensis
- †Cervalces
  - †Cervalces scotti
- Clethrionomys
  - †Clethrionomys gapperi
- Equus
- Erethizon
  - †Erethizon dorsatum
- Fossaria
- Gyraulus
  - †Gyraulus deflectus
  - †Gyraulus parvus
- Helisoma
  - †Helisoma anceps
- Helophorus
  - †Helophorus rigescens – type locality for species
- †Hydrochus
  - †Hydrochus amictus – type locality for species
- Lucina
- Lymnaea
- †Mammut
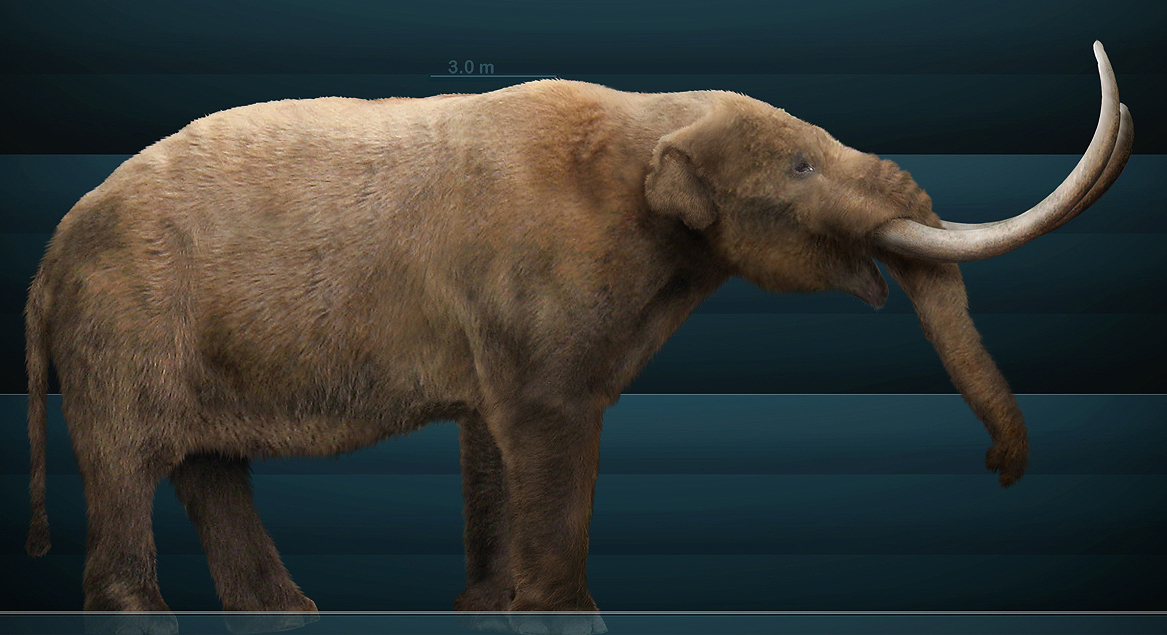
  - Restoration of a Mammut americanum, or American mastodon
    †Mammut americanum
- †Megalonyx
  - †Megalonyx jeffersonii
- †Meomphix
- Microtus
  - †Microtus xanthognathus
- Mictomys
  - †Mictomys borealis
- Mustela
  - †Mustela americana
  - †Mustela richardsonii
- Odocoileus
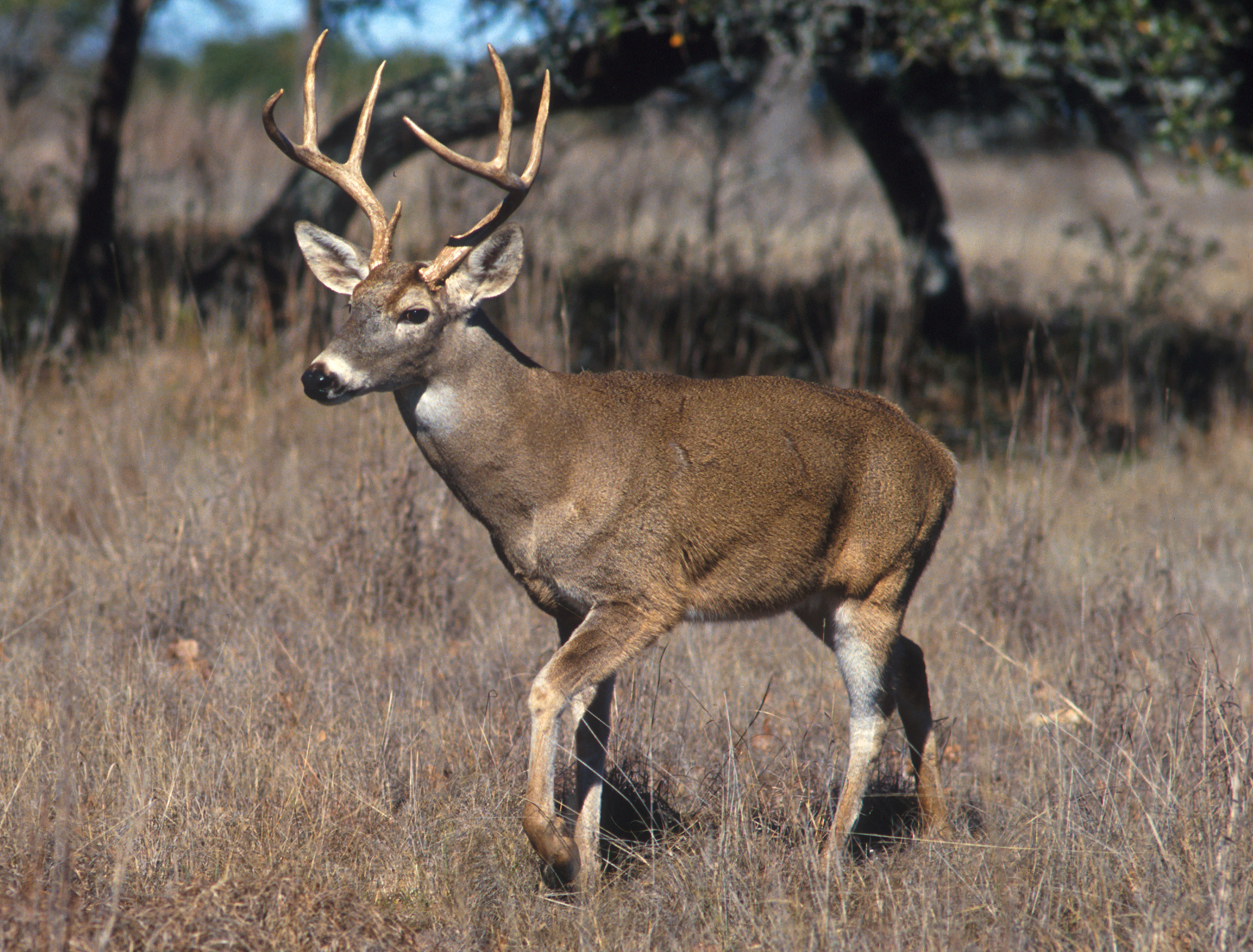
  - A living Odocoileus virginianus, or white-tailed deer
    †Odocoileus virginianus
- Ondatra
  - †Ondatra zibethicus
- Pekania
  - †Pekania pennanti
- Phenacomys
  - †Phenacomys intermedius
- Physa
  - †Physa heterostropha – or unidentified comparable form
- Picea
- Planorbis
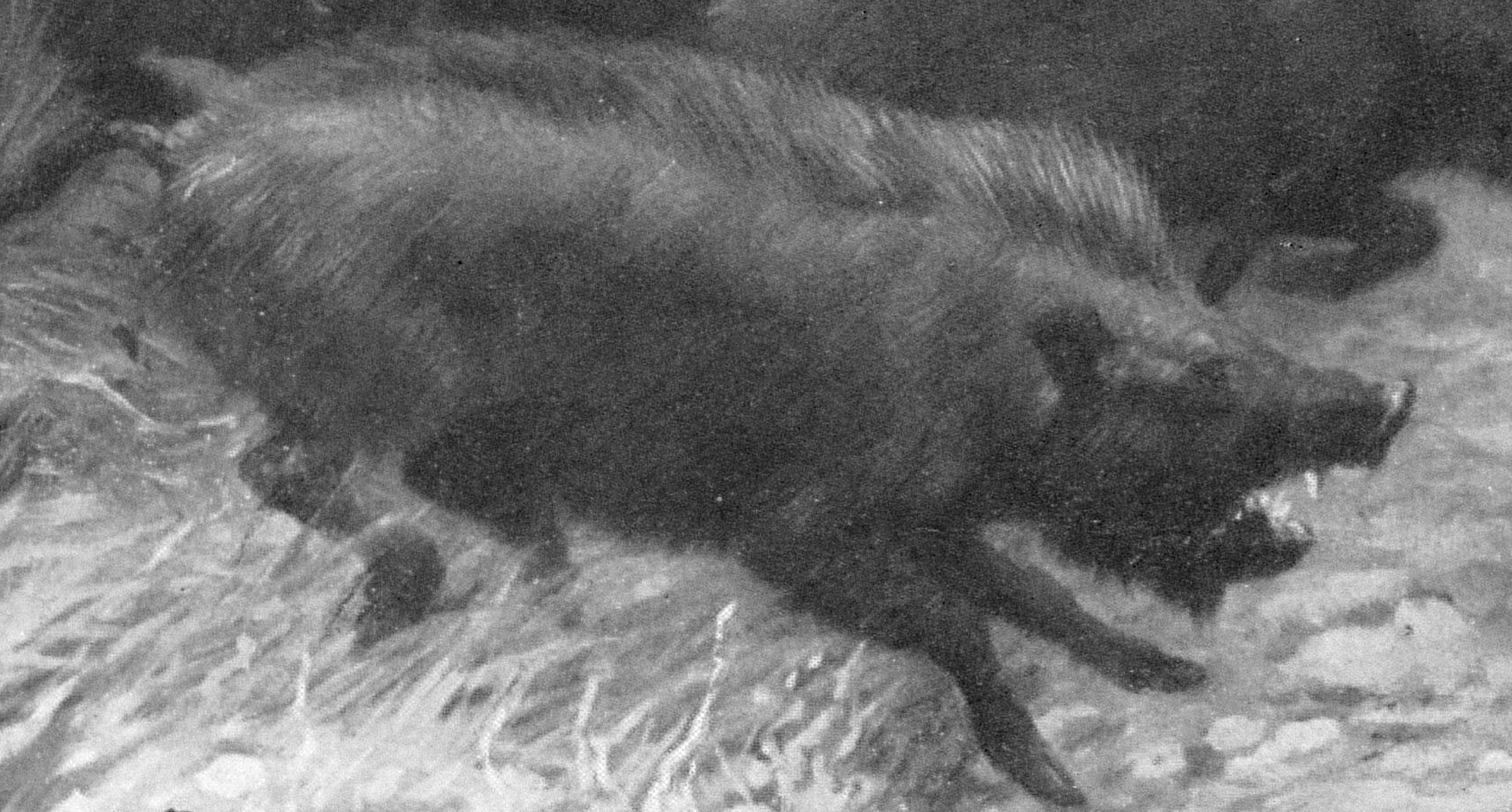
- Restoration of a herd of alarmed Miocene-Pleistocene peccaries of the genus Platygonus. Charles R. Knight (1922).
  †Platygonus
  - †Platygonus compressus
- Promenetus
  - †Promenetus exacuous
- Pterostichus
  - †Pterostichus dormitans – type locality for species
- Rangifer
  - †Rangifer tarandus
- Sorex
  - †Sorex cinereus
  - †Sorex hoyi
- Sphaerium
- Stagnicola
  - †Stagnicola lanceata
- Ursus
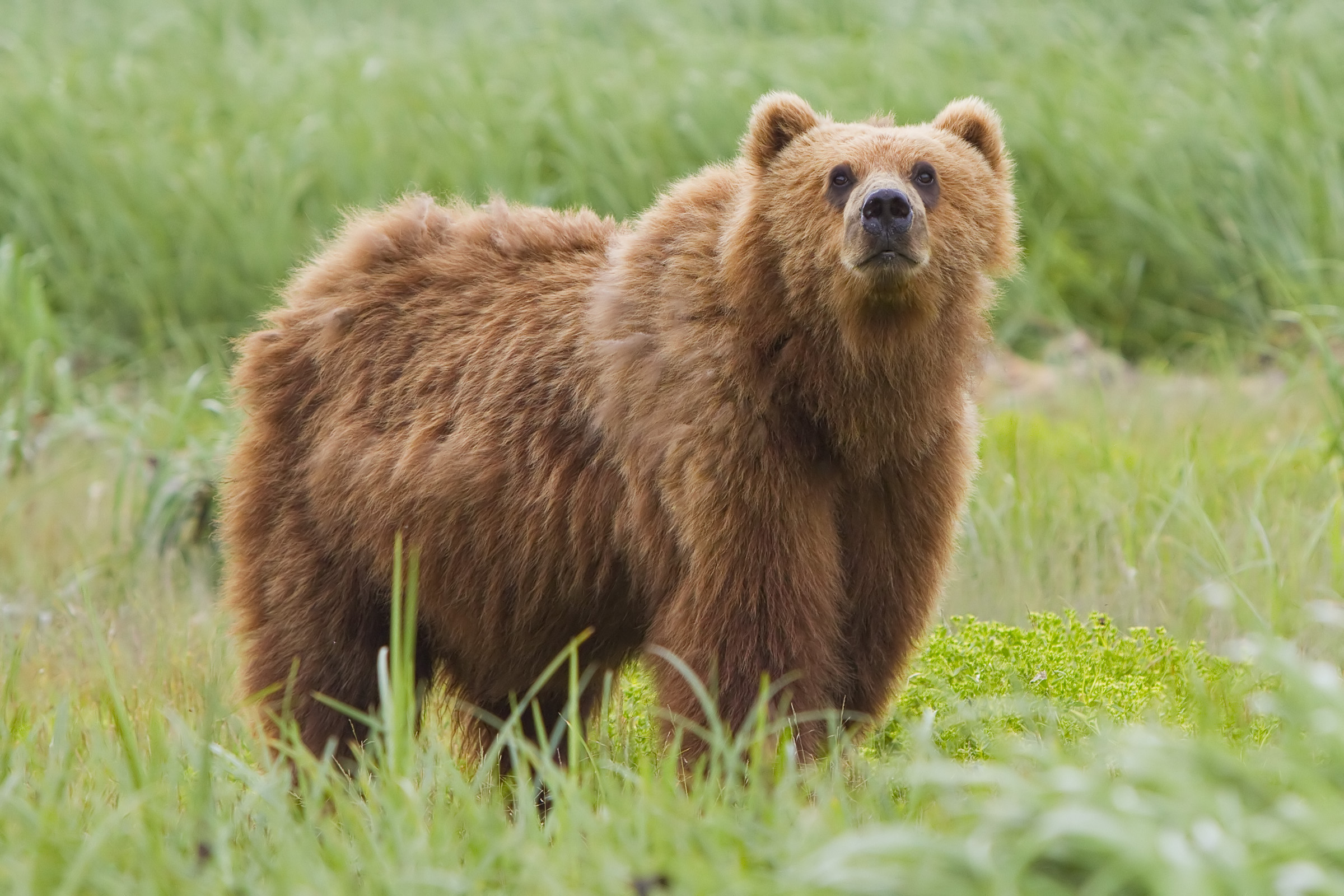
  - A living Ursus arctos, or brown bear
    †Ursus arctos – type locality for species
- Valvata
  - †Valvata tricarinata
