= Lavaloceras =

Lavaloceras Temporal range: Middle Ordovician

Scientific classification
- Kingdom: Animalia
- Phylum: Mollusca
- Class: Cephalopoda
- Subclass: Nautiloidea
- Order: †Discosorida
- Family: †Westonoceratidae
- Genus: †Lavaloceras; Flower, 1952

Paleozoic genus of molluscs

Lavaloceras is a genus of middle Ordivician discosorids included in the Westonoceratidae. The shell as nearly straight, with a slight exogastic curvature, and is rather short, breviconic.

According to Teichert, 1964, Lavaloceras is more closely related to Westonoceras and Winnipegoceras than to Faberoceras which is thought to have given rise to the Lowoceratidae
