= Kayoceras =

Kayoceras Temporal range: MiddleSilurian

Scientific classification
- Domain: Eukaryota
- Kingdom: Animalia
- Phylum: Mollusca
- Class: Cephalopoda
- Subclass: Nautiloidea
- Order: †Discosorida
- Family: †Discosoridae
- Genus: †Kayoceras; Foerste, 1934

Extinct genus of molluscs

Kayoceras is a genus of middle Silurian nautiloid cephalopods, known from Iowa and Illinois, belonging to the Discosoridae. Related genera include Discosorus, Endodiscosorus, and Stokesoceras. Kayoceras has a short, breviconic shell, like Discosorus, but with a more central siphuncle. Derivation is probably from Discosorus, through an evolutionary shifting of the siphuncle position, which has its origin in the Lowoceratidae, possibly through Tuyloceras.
