= Sinclairoceras =

Sinclairoceras Temporal range: Middle Ordovician

Scientific classification
- Kingdom: Animalia
- Phylum: Mollusca
- Class: Cephalopoda
- Subclass: Nautiloidea
- Order: †Discosorida
- Family: †Westonoceratidae
- Genus: †Sinclairoceras; Flower, 1952

Genus of molluscs

Sinclairoceras is a nautiloid cephalopod in the discosorid family Westonoceratidae from the Middle Ordovician Simard Limestone of Quebec. The shell is laterally compressed, upwardly curved, and short; an exogastric brevicone with the venter narrowly and dorsum broadly rounded. The dorsum, at the upper surface, is only slightly concave longitudinally. The venter, at the lower surface, is more strongly convex longitudinally, drawing away from the dorsum and forming a hump at the anterior end of the phragmocone where Sinclairoceras reaches its greatest width.

The upper and lower sides of the body chamber are essentially straight and virtually parallel, flaring slightly at the aperture. The sides however converge on the aperture which is laterally narrowed, flaring just before.

The siphuncle is near the venter. Segments are broadly expanded and broadly rounded, differing from the more narrow segments of Simardoceras but similar in outline to those of Reedsoceras.

Sinclairoceras differs from the overall similar Westonoceras in being shorter and less markedly swollen at the mature end of the phragmocone. It is found associated with Simardoceras and Reedsoceras with which it may be closely related.
