= Konglungenoceras =

Konglungenoceras Temporal range: Early Silurian

Scientific classification
- Domain: Eukaryota
- Kingdom: Animalia
- Phylum: Mollusca
- Class: Cephalopoda
- Subclass: Nautiloidea
- Order: †Discosorida
- Family: †Cyrtogomphoceratidae
- Genus: †Konglungenoceras; Sweet, 1959

Type of Discorid found on Lower Siluran of Europe (Norway)

Konglungenoceras is a discorid from the lower Silurian of Europe (Norway) and part of the Cyrtogomphocerae family. It lacks the septal foramina grasping bullettes at the adapical end of the connecting rings. Its shells are endogastric and strongly compressed, such that the ventral or siphuncle side is curved inward and the dorso-ventral height is greater than the width. Endosiphuncular deposits in the apical portion of the siphuncle consist of thick overlapping parietal laminae that form endocones, similar to those of Discosorus and Alpenoceras.

Although included in the Cyrtogomphoceratidae, its derivation is undetermined. The siphuncle characters as well as its stratigraphic position are suggestive of the Discosoridae.
