= Teichertoceras =

Teichertoceras Temporal range: M Ordovician

Scientific classification
- Domain: Eukaryota
- Kingdom: Animalia
- Phylum: Mollusca
- Class: Cephalopoda
- Subclass: Nautiloidea
- Order: †Discosorida
- Family: †Westonoceratidae
- Genus: †Teichertoceras; Foeste, 1933

Teichertoceras is a discosorid genus in the family Westonoceratidae characterized by an endogastric curvature to the early portion of the phragmocone.

The shell of Teichertoceras is moderately compressed, the early portion a narrow expanding cyrtocone that in the adult become more swollen, taking on an exogastric aspect. The body chamber in the adult is contracted toward the aperture. The siphuncle is ventral. Bullettes at the adapical ends of the connecting rings are small.

Teichertoceras is thought to have given rise to Westonoceras and Faberoceras and to be derived from Ulrichoceras. It is found in geological formations of Middle Ordovician age in North America.
