= Discosorus =

Discosorus Temporal range: Middle Silurian

Scientific classification
- Kingdom: Animalia
- Phylum: Mollusca
- Class: Cephalopoda
- Subclass: Nautiloidea
- Order: †Discosorida
- Family: †Discosoridae
- Genus: †Discosorus; Hall, 1852

Genus of molluscs

Discosorus, a genus of the Discosorida and member of the family Discosoridae. Not to be confused with Discoceras. Discosorus consists of rapidly expanding endogastric brevicones, mostly known from isolated siphuncles composed of broadly expanded segments that increase rapidly in size. Septal necks are recumbent, connecting rings thin, bullettes small. The siphuncle interior is occupied by endocones produced by layered annular deposits expanded back toward the apex, leaving a central tube running down the middle. The short phragmocone is poorly known.

Discosorus is found in the Middle Silurian of eastern and arctic North America and as part of the Discosoratidae is derived from the Lowoceratidae which forms a link in the Early Silurian from the Late Ordovician exogastric Faberoceras of the Westonoceratidae.

== See also ==
- List of nautiloids
