= Simardoceras =

Simardoceras Temporal range: M Ordovician

Scientific classification
- Domain: Eukaryota
- Kingdom: Animalia
- Phylum: Mollusca
- Class: Cephalopoda
- Subclass: Nautiloidea
- Order: †Discosorida
- Family: †Westonoceratidae
- Genus: †Simardoceras; Flower, 1957

Genus in the Westonoceratidae family

Simardoceras is a genus in the discosorid (nautiloid cephalopod) family Westonoceratidae from the Middle Ordovician of Quebec.

The shell of Simardoceras is a moderately expanding exogastric cyrtocone, said to resemble a rather large Oncoceras, but with a siphuncle that is definitely discosorid. The venter is almost uniformly convex in longitudinal profile. The dorsal profile changes from concave in the apical portion to straight, then slightly convex at the front of the phragmocone and back of the body chamber, the concave again near the aperture.

The siphuncle is ventral. Segments are subquadrate in outline and are longer than broad. Connecting rings are thick.

Although Simardoceras somewhat resembles Winnipegoceras is the form of its siphuncle, it differs in its very broad cross section. The slender siphuncle segments also distinguish it from the apparently more closely related Sinclairoceras and from its apparent derivative Reedsoceras.

Sinclairoceras, Simardoceras, and Reedsoceras are found in beds of Black River age (Middle Ordovician) and seem to be closely related, and may even form a phylogenetic (evolutionary) series.
