= Katageioceras =

Scientific classification
- Kingdom: Animalia
- Phylum: Mollusca
- Class: Cephalopoda
- Subclass: Nautiloidea
- Order: †Discosorida
- Family: †Discosoridae
- Genus: †Katageioceras; Zhuravleva, 1972

Genus of molluscs

Katageioceras is a genus of nautiloid cephalopods from the Devonian named by Zhuravleva in 1972, related to Kadaroceras and Karadzharoceras and other genera that possibly belong to the Discosoridae.
