= Reedsoceras =

Reedsoceras Temporal range: Middle-Upper Ordovician

Scientific classification
- Domain: Eukaryota
- Kingdom: Animalia
- Phylum: Mollusca
- Class: Cephalopoda
- Subclass: Nautiloidea
- Order: †Discosorida
- Family: †Westonoceratidae
- Genus: †Reedsoceras; Foeste, 1928

Extinct genus of molluscs

Reedsoceras is a genus of large discosorids (Nautiloidea) in the family Westonoceratidae from the middle and upper Ordovician of North America.

Reedsoceras was named as a genus characterized by rapidly expanding exogastric cyrtocones with unconstricted apertures and straight sutures. The siphuncle is close to the venter, which is the externally convex side of the shell, and is composed of very short, broadly rounded segments. Structure of the siphuncle wall is unknown.

Reedsoceras seems to be derived from Simardoceras and to be more closely related to a group that also includes Sinclairoceras than to other westonoceratids, especially those with long narrowing body chambers and bent back exogastric phragmocones like Winnipegoceras.
