= Karadzharoceras =

Karadzharoceras Temporal range: Devonian

Scientific classification
- Kingdom: Animalia
- Phylum: Mollusca
- Class: Cephalopoda
- Subclass: Nautiloidea
- Order: †Discosorida
- Genus: †Karadzharoceras; Zhuravleva, 1972

Extinct genus of nautiloid cephalopods

Karadzharoceras is a genus of discosorids from the Devonian, named by Zhuravleva in 1972, possibly a member of the Discosoridae. Discosorids are nautiloid cephalopods generally characterized by inflated siphuncle segments that expand into the chambers and by connecting rings that vary in composition along their length. Kadaroceras and Katageioceras are related genera.
