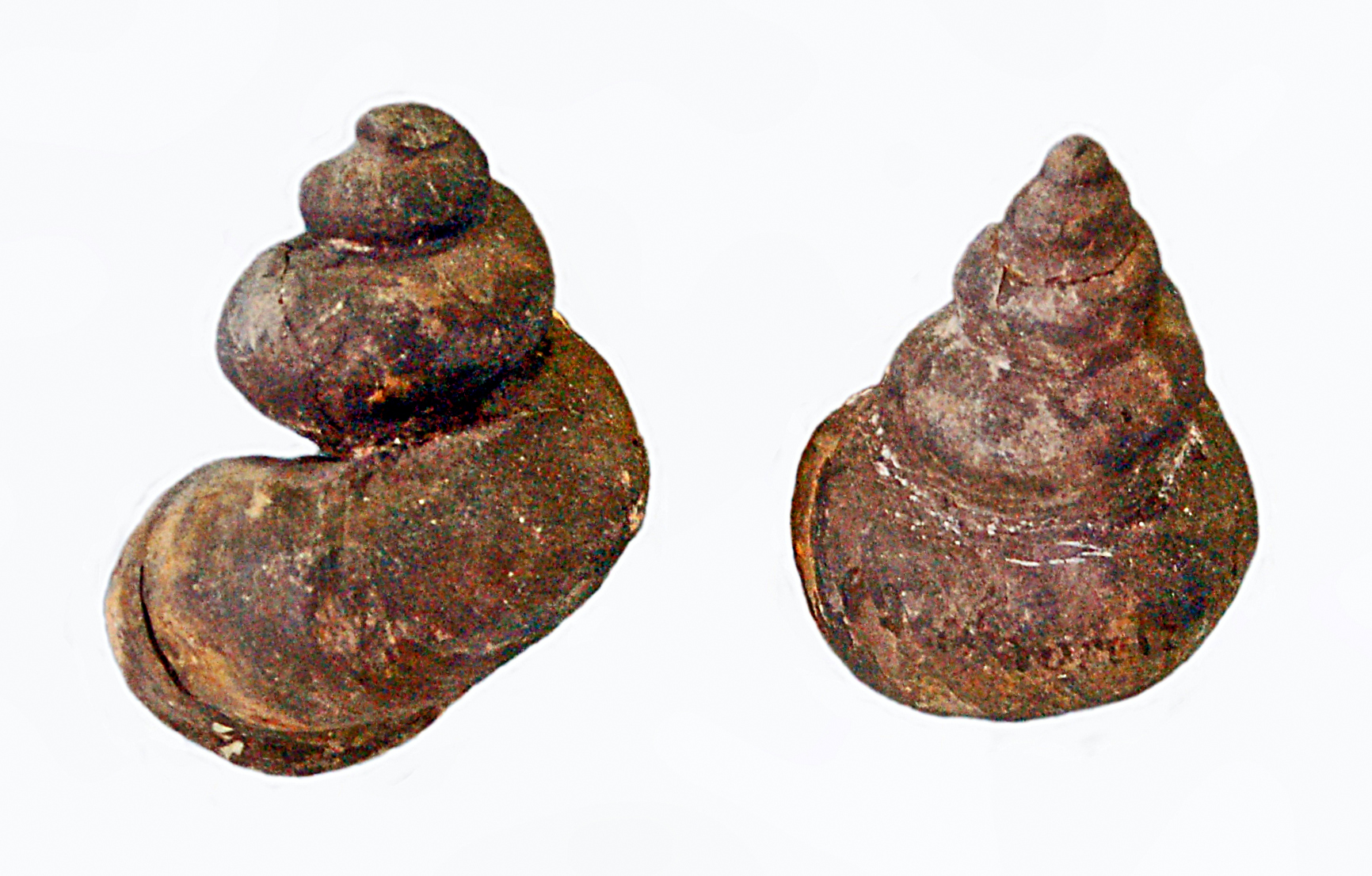
- Holopea praestans from Czech Republic, at the National Museum (Prague)

Scientific classification
- Kingdom: Animalia
- Phylum: Mollusca
- Class: Gastropoda
- Subclass: Vetigastropoda
- Family: †Holopeidae; Cossmann, 1908

Type species
- Turbo petholatus Linnaeus, 1758

Synonyms
- Cycloridae S. A. Miller, 1889

= Holopeidae =

Extinct family of gastropods

†Holopeidae is an extinct family of paleozoic gastropod mollusks. These molluscs were stationary epifaunal suspension feeders.

This family is unassigned to superfamily. This family has no subfamilies.

== Genera ==
Genera in the family Holopeidae include:

- Cyclora
- Eopagodea
- Holopea J. Hall, 1847
- Pachystrophia Perner, 1903
- Ptychonema Perner, 1903
- Raphistomina Ulrich & Scofield, 1897
- Sinutropis Perner, 1903 but in family Euomphalidae
- Umbospira Perner, 1903
