= Clarkesvillia =

Clarkesvillia Temporal range: U Ordovician

Scientific classification
- Domain: Eukaryota
- Kingdom: Animalia
- Phylum: Mollusca
- Class: Cephalopoda
- Subclass: Nautiloidea
- Order: †Discosorida
- Family: †Westonoceratidae
- Genus: †Clarkesvillia; Flower, 1946

Extinct genus of molluscs

Clarkesvillia is a genus of Upper Ordovician westonocerids that differs from Faberoceras in having a more flattened venter and from the later Glyptodendron in having a more ventrally located siphuncle.
