= Kadaroceras =

Kadaroceras Temporal range: Devonian

Scientific classification
- Kingdom: Animalia
- Phylum: Mollusca
- Class: Cephalopoda
- Subclass: Nautiloidea
- Order: †Discosorida
- Genus: †Kadaroceras; Zhuravleva, 1972

Extinct genus of molluscs

Kadaroceras is a genus of discosorids from the Devonian, named by Zhuravleva, 1972, possibly a member of the Discosoridae. Discosorids are nautiloid cephalopods generally characterized by inflated siphuncle segments that expand into the chambers and by connecting rings that vary in composition along their length.

Karadzharoceras and Katageioceras are related genera.
