= Hecatoceras =

Hecatoceras Temporal range: Upper Ordovician

Scientific classification
- Kingdom: Animalia
- Phylum: Mollusca
- Class: Cephalopoda
- Subclass: Nautiloidea
- Order: †Discosorida
- Family: †Westonoceratidae
- Genus: †Hecatoceras; Teichert and Glenister, 1952

Extinct genus of molluscs

Hectoceras is a genus in the nautiloid cephalopod order Discosorida from the Upper Ordovician of Australia (Tasmania), known from a few isolated siphuncle specimens.

The siphuncle specimens, which go with two described species, consist of gradually enlarging, expanded segments in a slender series, suggesting similarly slender shells, which themselves are unknown. The interiors of the siphuncles are filled with nested calcareous deposits that form endocones, conformable to the interior shape, leaving a narrow irregular central tube. Connecting with are apparently somewhat thick. Anomalously the bullettes, where the connecting rings attach to the previous septal openings are unswollen.

The slight endogastric curvature, as interpreted by Teichert and Glenister, suggests inclusion in the Cyrtogomphoceratidae, or ancestral Reudemannoceratidae; however endosiphuncular deposits are otherwise lacking in both these families. The organic deposits within the siphuncle suggests it is more likely Hectoceras is a member of the Westonoceratidae to which it has been assigned.
