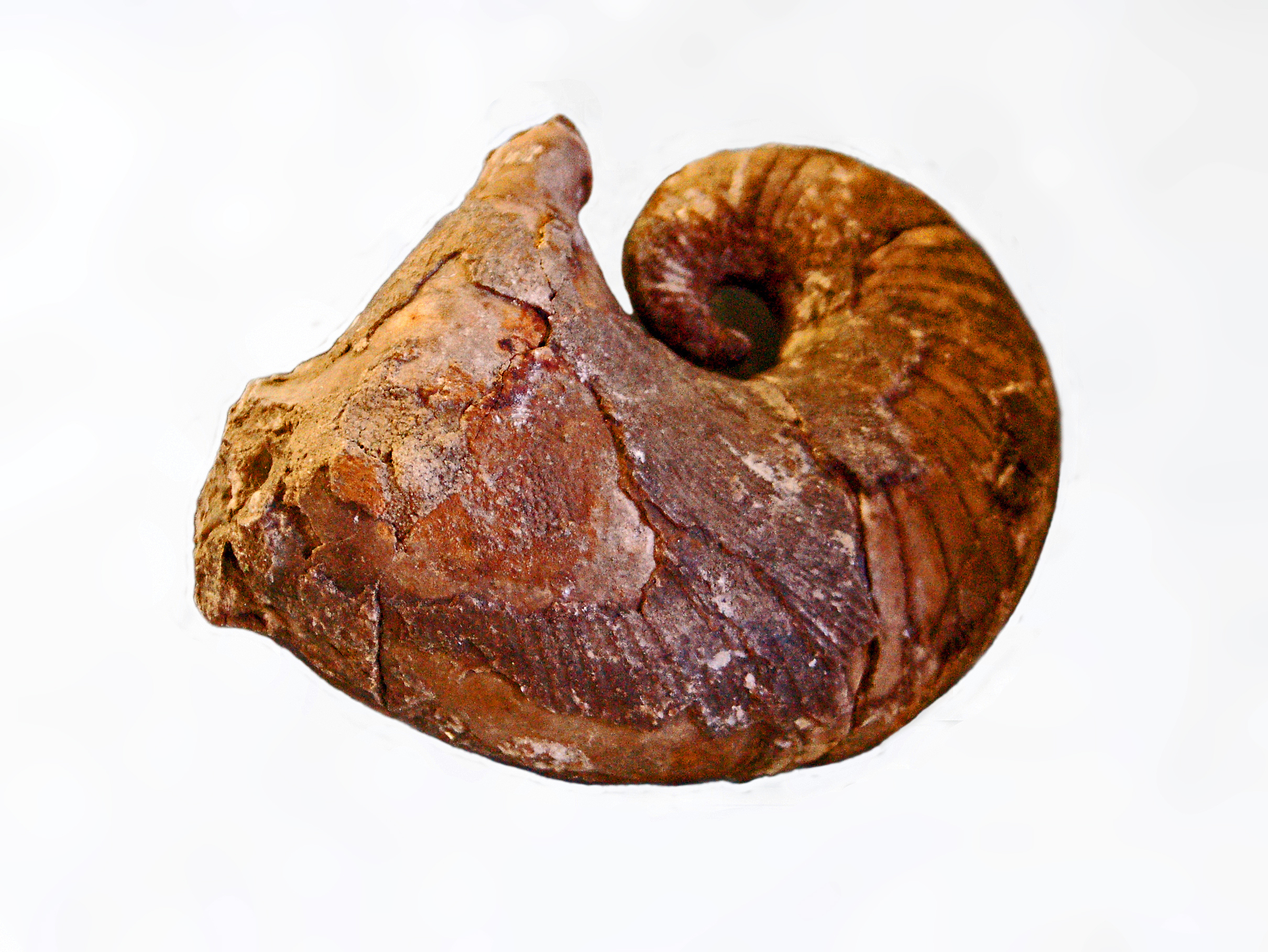
- Phragmoceras broderipi from Beroun, Dlauhà, Prague Basin at the National Museum (Prague)

Scientific classification
- Kingdom: Animalia
- Phylum: Mollusca
- Class: Cephalopoda
- Subclass: Nautiloidea
- Order: †Discosorida
- Family: †Phragmoceratidae; Flower (1957)

Genera
- See text

= Phragmoceratidae =

Phragmoceratidae Temporal range: Wenlock–Pridoli

Extinct family of molluscs

The Phragmoceratidae is a family of extinct nautiloid cephalopods from the Order Discosorida that lived during the latter part of the Silurian.

== Diagnosis ==
Phragmoceratids are characterized by generally compressed, upwardly curved endogastric shells with slit-like apertures for egress and ventral siphuncles with broadly expanded segments, thick connecting rings, and small to vestigial bullettes.

Phragmoceratids are morphologically similar in regards to their constricted apertures to the more cylindrical and orthoconic Mandaloceratidae, also discosorids, and to the oncocerid Hemiphragmoceratidae (Sweet 1964); both which also come from the Silurian.

== Derivation ==
The Phragmoceratidae are derived from the Ordovician Cyrtogomphoceratidae which are also endogastric but with open, unconstricted apertures and well-developed bullettes in the siphuncle.

== Phylogeny ==
The family has its beginning with the Middle Silurian Protophragmoceras, known from a gradually and evenly expanding endogastric shell with an unrestricted aperture, like that of its cyrtogomphoceratid ancestors, deep sharp hyponomic sinus for the water-jet funnel, and ventral siphuncle, phragmoceratid in character.

Protophragmoceras gave rise to the Middle Silurian Phragmoceras, which gave rise to the closely related Middle Silurian Tubiferoceras and to the Upper Silurian Pristeroceras and Phragmocerina. Protophagmoceras also gave rise to the less characteristic but still included Middle Silurian Endoplectoceras and Sthenoceras, which extends into the Lower Devonian.

== Genera ==
Phragmoceras, type genus, is known by its moderately large, strongly curved, rapidly enlarging, endogastric and compressed shell with a vertically constricted aperture that opens up at either end. The siphuncle is close to the concave ventral margin, segments broadly expanded, connecting rings thick, bullettes identifiable.

Tubiferoceras is similar to Phragmocreas except that the dorsal expansion of the aperture sits on a tubular extension and the shell is straighter and more rapidly expanding.

Pristeroceras differs from Phragmoceras in having a crenulated margin to the aperture. Phragmocerina is less compressed than Phragmoceras but with a similar aperture and like Phragmoceras is endogastric in the early stages but becomes straight in the later.

Endoplectoceras is similar to Protophragmoceras except the shell is more slender and has faint trochoidal coiling.

Sthenoceras has a fairly large, smooth endogastric shell, more strongly curved in the early stages, aperture that is only slightly contracted, and siphuncle with variably expanded segments and small bulletes.

Contemporary cephalopods include oncocerids, barrandeocerids, orthocerids, and actinocerids.
