= Centrifugus =

Centrifugus Temporal range: Upper Silurian

Scientific classification
- Kingdom: Animalia
- Phylum: Mollusca
- Class: Gastropoda
- Family: †Euomphalidae
- Genus: †Centrifugus; Bronn, 1934

Extinct species of gastropod

†Centrifugus is an extinct species of fossil sea snail, a marine gastropod mollusk in the family Euomphalidae, which paleontologists place in the order Archaeogastropoda.

This species was originally known from the Upper Silurian of northern Europe (Gotland).

== Description ==
The shell has a nearly flat spire, and is widest across the base, which is marked by a peripheral keel. The upper side of the aperture has a narrow slit, and a selenizone located close to the upper suture. Five strong spiral cords alternating with weaker ones cover the upper surface of the shell.
