= Reudemannoceratidae =

Reudemannoceratidae Temporal range: Middle Ordovician

Scientific classification
- Domain: Eukaryota
- Kingdom: Animalia
- Phylum: Mollusca
- Class: Cephalopoda
- Subclass: Nautiloidea
- Order: †Discosorida
- Family: †Reudemannoceratidae; Flower, 1940

Extinct family of nautiloids

The Reudemannoceratidae are the ancestral and most primitive of the Discosorida, an order of cephalopods from the early Paleozoic. The Reudemannoceratidae produced generally medium-sized endogastric and almost straight shells with the siphuncle slightly ventral from the center.

== Derivation ==
The Reudemannoceratidae first appeared at the beginning of the Middle Ordovician, North American Whiterock Stage, (since renamed to Dapingian by the International Commission on Stratigraphy), and are restricted to the lower part of that series: the middle Ordovician. Their origin is unknown. The siphuncles in early members contain features in the early growth stages reminiscent of the siphuncular bulbs found the archaic Plectronoceratae of the Late Cambrian. but so far no unambiguous Lower Ordovician intermediaries have been found.

== Characters ==
Reudemannoceratids are characterized by having short septal necks in the juvenile portion of the siphuncle, toward the apex of the shell, which later in life grow folded back along the back side of the septa in the characteristic fashion of the Discosorida. The connecting ring is bowed out into the camerae and is divided into the characteristic zones, the vinculum, granular zone, conchiolinous (or chitinous) zone offset by amorphous bands, and the layered bullette attached to the previous septal neck.

== Genera ==
The Reucenammanoceratidae contain three genera. They are Reudemannoceras, Franklinoceras, and Madiganella. Reudemannoceras and Franklinoceras, named by Flower in 1940 and 1957, are found the Champlain Valley in eastern North America. Madiganella, named by Teichert and Glenister in 1952, comes from central Australia.

Reudemannoceras is described as having a somewhat compressed endogastric shell, such that the width is greater than the height, with the venter slightly flattened. Sutures are closely spaced and slope forward from venter to dorsum with the obliquity increasing as growth progressed. The early part of the shell is essentially straight, but afterward expands and is notably curved. The early segments in the siphuncle are bulb shaped and the septal necks are short. In the later part of the shell she segments are expanded and septal necks become recumbent. The connecting rings are thick and have the zoning characteristic of the earlier Discosorids with well-developed bullettes.

Franklinoceras is similar to Reudemannocereras, except that the shell is compressed and the sutures are straight.

Madiganella has a large, slender, straight or nearly straight shell with a siphuncle composed of broad, expanded segments and short, strongly recurved necks. Growth lines indicate a shallow hyponomic sinus.

== Evolution and phylogeny ==
Reudemannoceras gave rise to the Cyrtogomphoceratidae through Ulrichoceras as a result of an evolutionary ventral shift of the siphuncle and the development of large, inflated bullettes. Ulrichoceras is the probable ancestor of the Westonoceratidae as well. Reudemannoceras is also thought to have given rise to Madiganella by an evolutionary straightening of the shell which by the subsequent development of T-shaped constricted apertures gave rise to the Mandaloceratidae. Franklinoceras seems to be an offshoot of Reudemanoceras with no progeny.

== Ecology and lifestyle ==
Reudemannoceratids probably lived on or near the sea floor. Endogastric Reudemannoceras and Franklinoceras are likely to have carried their shells high and to the back, aperture facing downward, as they probed the sea bed for prey. The more advanced and slightly later Madiganella may have been a fair swimmer, as indicated by the hyponomic sinus, and may have been an active stalker with a horizontal orientation.
