= Glyptodendron =

Glyptodendron Temporal range: L Silurian

Scientific classification
- Domain: Eukaryota
- Kingdom: Animalia
- Phylum: Mollusca
- Class: Cephalopoda
- Subclass: Nautiloidea
- Order: †Discosorida
- Family: †Westonoceratidae
- Genus: †Glyptodendron; Claypole, 1878
- Species: †G. eatonense

Binomial name
- †Glyptodendron eatonense Claypole, 1878

Glyptodendron is a Lower Silurian westonocerid characterized by compressed cyrtocones with a narrowly rounded dorsum and greatest width in the ventrolateral region. Sutures slope forward from the dorsum which is on the longitudinally concave side. The siphuncle is slightly ventral from the center. Segments are subspherical in the young; equally broad but shorter in the adult. No endosiphuncular deposits are known. The surface of the shell is covered by obliquely intersecting rows of scale-like pits.

It was first described by E. W. Claypole as part of a "tree-like fossil plant" thought to be similar to Lepidodendron. The type material is from Eaton in Preble County, Ohio.

Its generic etymology is modified from the Greek glypto (γλύφω) for "I engrave" and it "alludes to the depressed areoles" which Claypole erroneously interpreted from the superficial pits across the shell as being similar to those seen in lycopsid plants. Its specific epithet refers to it the locality from which the fossils were recovered by Leven Siler, a student of Professor E. W. Claypole (Antioch College, Yellow Springs, Ohio). The same locality produced typical Silurian-aged fossils of the Niagara Group.

Though originally described as a plant fossil, fifteen years after its description, the type material of Glyptodendron was re-examined by noted paleontologist, August F. Foerste who recognized its true identity as a nautiloid. Foerste thought it might prove to be referable to the better known Cyrtoceras, a previously described nautiloid taxon.

== See also ==
- List of nautiloids
