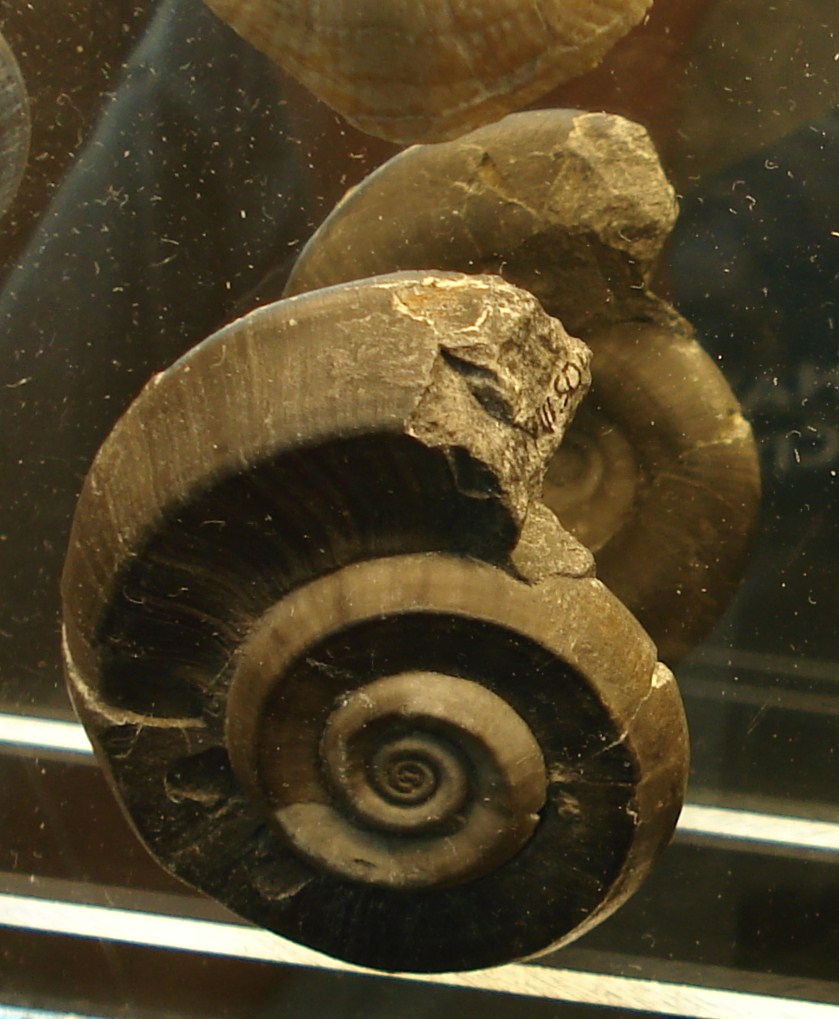
- Euomphalus pentangulatus

Scientific classification
- Kingdom: Animalia
- Phylum: Mollusca
- Class: Gastropoda
- Family: †Euomphalidae
- Genus: †Euomphalus; J. de C. Sowerby, 1814

= Euomphalus =

Euomphalus Temporal range: Silurian–Kungurian

Genus of archaeogastropods

Euomphalus is a genus of fossil marine gastropods known to have lived from the Silurian to the Middle Permian.

== Description ==
Euomphalus is characterized by a closely coiled shell with a depressed to slightly elevated spire and a channel-bearing angulation (a selenizone) on the upper surface of the whorls. The lower surface of the whorls is rounded to angular.

Amphiscapha, Philoxene, and Straparollus are among similar related genera. Serpulospira, also related, differs in having a broadly open spiral in the adult form.

== Taxonomy ==
Euomphalus is the type genus of the family Euomphalidae. Euomphalus pentangulatus (Sowerby, 1814) is its type species.

== Species ==
Currenct species valid or need reassessment

- Euomphalus pentangulatus Sowerby, 1814(type)
- Euomphalus radiatus Menke, 1850: synonym of Heliacus (Heliacus) areola bicanaliculatus (Valenciennes, 1832) represented as Heliacus areola bicanaliculatus (Valenciennes, 1832)
- Euomphalus africanum (Heidelberger, Korn & Ebbighausen, 2009) †
- Euomphalus cornudanus (Shumard, 1859) †
- Euomphalus intermedius (M. Gordon & Yochelson, 1983) †
- Euomphalus kaibabensisChronic, 1952 †
- Euomphalus mapingensis (Grabau, 1936) †
- Euomphalus marginatiformis (B. K. Likharev, 1967) †
- Euomphalus marginatus Eichwald, 1860 †
- Euomphalus moniliferus Romanovsky, 1890 †
- Euomphalus obtusus J. Hall, 1858 †
- Euomphalus peskensis (Mazaev, 1994) †
- Euomphalus pirochiensis (Mazaev, 1994) †
- Euomphalus tenuistriatus X.-G. Zhu, 1995 †

== Species that need a review ==
- Euomphalus archiaci Goldfuss, 1844 †
- Euomphalus basinodosus Kirchner, 1915 †
- Euomphalus bronnii Goldfuss, 1844 †
- Euomphalus circularis J. Phillips, 1841 †
- Euomphalus contrarius Münster, 1841 †
- Euomphalus depressus J. Hall, 1843 †
- Euomphalus discus Goldfuss, 1844 †
- Euomphalus disiunctus Goldfuss, 1844 †
- Euomphalus eurekensis Walcott, 1884 †
- Euomphalus gradatus Koken, 1896 †
- Euomphalus jiangyouensis Y.-T. Pan, 1978 †
- Euomphalus latus Y.-T. Pan, 1978 †
- Euomphalus majiaobaensis Y.-T. Pan, 1978 †
- Euomphalus minimus McCoy, 1847 †
- Euomphalus nitidulus Lindström, 1880 †
- Euomphalus obtusangulus Lindström, 1880 †
- Euomphalus planodorsatus Meek & Worthen, 1861 †
- Euomphalus planorbis d'Archiac & Verneuil, 1842 †
- Euomphalus praecursor Lindström, 1884 †
- Euomphalus pygmaeus Münster, 1841 †
- Euomphalus pygmaeus Dunker, 1848 † invalid; not Münster, 1841)
- Euomphalus rotula Goldfuss, 1844 †
- Euomphalus schnuri d'Archiac & Verneuil, 1842 †
- Euomphalus semiteres Goldfuss, 1844 †
- Euomphalus serpens J. Phillips, 1841 †
- Euomphalus spinosus Goldfuss, 1844 †
- Euomphalus strongi Whitfield, 1878 †
- Euomphalus triquetrus Lindström, 1884 †
- Euomphalus tuba Lindström, 1884 †
- Euomphalus umbilicatus Meek & Worthen, 1861 †
- Euomphalus vermilia Goldfuss, 1844 †
- Euomphalus vermis Whidborne, 1896 †
- Euomphalus verneuillii Goldfuss, 1844 †
- Euomphalus walmstedti Lindström, 1884 †
