= Cylicioscapha =

Cylicioscapha Temporal range: Middle Pennsylvanian - Middle Permian

Scientific classification
- Missing taxonomy template (fix): Cylicioscapha

Extinct genus of gastropods

Cylicioscapha is an extinct genus of fossil mollusk, probably a gastropod, a robust-looking euomphalid from the upper Paleozoic of North America.

== Description ==
The shell is depressed on both the upper and lower sides; the outer rim is flattish, knobby along the upper edge; the aperture, is more or less trapezoidal.
