= Mandaloceratidae =

Mandaloceratidae Temporal range: M -?U Silurian

Scientific classification
- Domain: Eukaryota
- Kingdom: Animalia
- Phylum: Mollusca
- Class: Cephalopoda
- Subclass: Nautiloidea
- Order: †Discosorida
- Family: †Mandaloceratidae; Flower, 1957

Genera
- See text

Extinct family of molluscs

Mandaloceratidae is a family in the nautiloid cephalopod order Discosorida, from the Middle and Upper(?) Silurian characterized by short, essentially straight shells referred to as breviconic, typically with a faintly exogastric shape produced by the profile of the body chamber.

Apertures vary from round to T-shaped, with a long narrow, ventral, hyponomic sinus for the maneuvering funnel. Siphuncles are commonly central or subcentral with generally broad, expanded, segments and usually thin connecting rings.

The narrow hyponomic sinus, which is an opening for the water-jet funnel by which the animal could move, much as with modern squid and octopods, points toward the lower or ventral side. The cross bar of the "T" or the round part of the aperture through which the animal could extend itself is located closer to the back or dorsal part of the shell.

== Phylogeny ==
The Mandaloceratidae are derived from the Reudemannoceratidae through Madiganella. The earliest mandeloceratid is Pseudogomphoceras which gave rise to Ovocerina. Ovocerina gave rise to Cinctoceras, Umbeloceras, Vesperoceras, and Mandaloceras. It also gave rise to the Mesoceratidae representing Mesoceras.

== Genera ==
Mandaloceras is the type genus of the Mandaloceratidae, characterized by straight or somewhat curved shells with a slightly depressed cross section (width greater than height) and a constricted T-shaped aperture. The siphuncle is subcentral and increases rapidly in width during the life of the animal. Segments are broad with thin connecting rings.

Cinctoceras is a large mandaloceratid with a breviconic shell that tends to be dorsally flattened, making its cross section slightly depressed; a constricted T-shape aperture and siphuncle segments that are short and broad.

Ovocerina is a small breviconic mandaloceratid with an exogastric aspect produced by the more convexly rounded lower (ventral) side and a rounded or transversely extended aperture that approaches the T-shaped aperture of Mandaloceras. The siphuncle is displaced slightly, either ventrally or dorsally from the center. Segments, composed of thin connecting rings, are broadly expanded.

Pseudogomphoceras is a large, atypically longiconic mandeloceratid that reflects its reudemannoceratid ancestry. The subcentral siphuncle contains vesicular deposits and a central tube. Otherwise it is like Ovoverina.

Umbelloceras is a small breviconic mandaloceratid with a cross section ranging from slightly depressed to slightly compressed (width > height to width < height) and a T-shaped aperture in which the two lateral branches curve toward the venter.

Vesperoceras is a medium size, generally straight, breviconic mandaloceratid with a broad annular expansion to the anterior part of the phragmocone followed by a constriction at the base of the body chamber. The siphuncle is located midway between the center and venter. Segments are moderately to strongly expanded. The aperture may be open or constricted.

Mandaloceras was named by Hyatt in Zittel 1900. The rest were named by Rousseau Flower, Ovocerina in 1947, Cinctoceras, Pseudogomphoceras, Umbelloceras, and Vesperoceras in Flower and Teichert, 1957. With the exception of Mandaloceras, which is also found in North America, the Mandaloceratidae are restricted to the Silurian of Europe.
