= Mesoceras =

Mesoceras Temporal range: Middle Silurian

Scientific classification
- Kingdom: Animalia
- Phylum: Mollusca
- Class: Cephalopoda
- Subclass: Nautiloidea
- Order: †Discosorida
- Family: †Mesoceratidae; Hyatt, 1884
- Genus: †Mesoceras; Barrande, 1877

Extinct genus of molluscs

Mesoceras is a mid Silurian discosorid from central Europe named by Barrande in 1877, with a short, anteriorly contracted body chamber and an aperture that is a long transverse slit. (Teichert 1964). The cross section is slightly oval with the dorso-ventral dimension slightly less than the lateral. Sutures are straight and transverse, the siphuncle is subcentral.

The relationship of Mesoceras to the other discosorids is unclear (Teichert 1964) but it is most likely derived from the Mandeloceratidae (Flower and Teichert 1957, Teichert 1964), perhaps from Ovacerina
