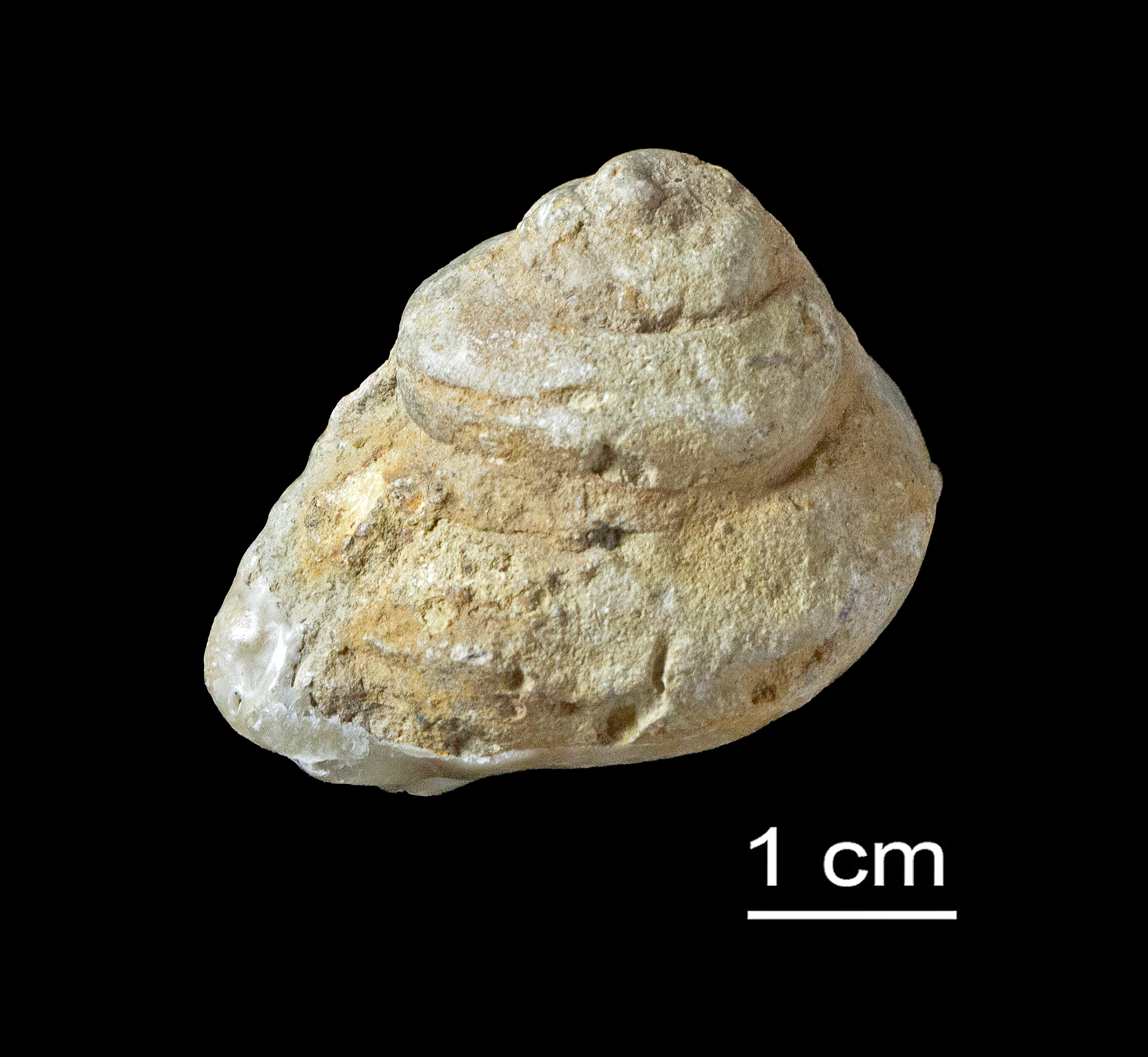
- Shell of † Holopea antiquata (specimen at Estonian Museum of Natural History)

Scientific classification
- Domain: Eukaryota
- Kingdom: Animalia
- Phylum: Mollusca
- Class: Gastropoda
- Subclass: Vetigastropoda
- Family: †Holopeidae
- Genus: †Holopea; J. Hall, 1847

Type species
- Turbo petholatus Linnaeus, 1758

Synonyms
- Cirropsis Perner, 1903; Haplospira Koken, 1897; Litiopsis Salter, 1866; Staurospira Perner, 1907; Tortilla Perner, 1903

= Holopea =

Extinct genus of gastropods

Holopea is an extinct genus of fossil sea snails, Paleozoic gastropod mollusks in the family Holopeidae.

These molluscs were stationary epifaunal suspension feeders. They lived in the Paleozoic Era, Ordovician Period, upper Arenigian age (between 478.6 ± 1.7 and 471.8 ± 1.6 million years ago) to the Carboniferous period, lower Serpukhovian age (from 328.3 (± 1.6) Ma to 318.1 (± 1.3) mya).

== Distribution ==
These fossil gastropods are found in: the Permian of China; the Devonian of Australia, Canada, United States; the Silurian of Australia, Canada, Russia, Sweden, United Kingdom, United States; the Ordovician of Canada, China, the Czech Republic, Estonia, Iran, New Zealand, Norway, Sweden, the United Kingdom, United States; Chazy of Canada; Arenig of Greenland.

== See also ==
- List of marine gastropod genera in the fossil record
- † Holopea antiquata J. Perner, 1903 (synonym: † Turbo balticus E.F.R.K. Koken & J. Perner, 1925)
- † Holopea bomiensis Y.-T. Pan, 1978 (unassessed)
