= Metaxys =

Scientific classification
- Domain: Eukaryota
- Kingdom: Animalia
- Phylum: Arthropoda
- Class: Insecta
- Order: Coleoptera
- Suborder: Adephaga
- Family: Carabidae
- Tribe: Abacetini
- Genus: Metaxys; Chaudoir, 1857

Genus of beetles

Metaxys is a genus of beetle in the family Carabidae first described by Maximilien Chaudoir in 1857.

== Species ==
Metaxys contains the following eighteen species:

- Metaxys amoenulus (Boheman, 1848)
- Metaxys basilewskyi (Straneo, 1953)
- Metaxys biguttatus Chaudoir, 1874
- Metaxys bipustulatus (Dejean, 1831)
- Metaxys bisignatus Chaudoir, 1857
- Metaxys congoensis (Straneo, 1954)
- Metaxys ellipticus (Straneo, 1948)
- Metaxys intermedius (Straneo, 1979)
- Metaxys iridescens (Murray, 1859)
- Metaxys kivuensis Burgeon, 1935
- Metaxys latithorax (Straneo, 1948)
- Metaxys minor (Straneo, 1951)
- Metaxys mirei (Straneo, 1991)
- Metaxys obesulus (Straneo, 1951)
- Metaxys rhodesianus Peringuey, 1908
- Metaxys schoutedeni Burgeon, 1935
- Metaxys sudanensis (Straneo, 1948)
- Metaxys ugandae (Straneo, 1948)
