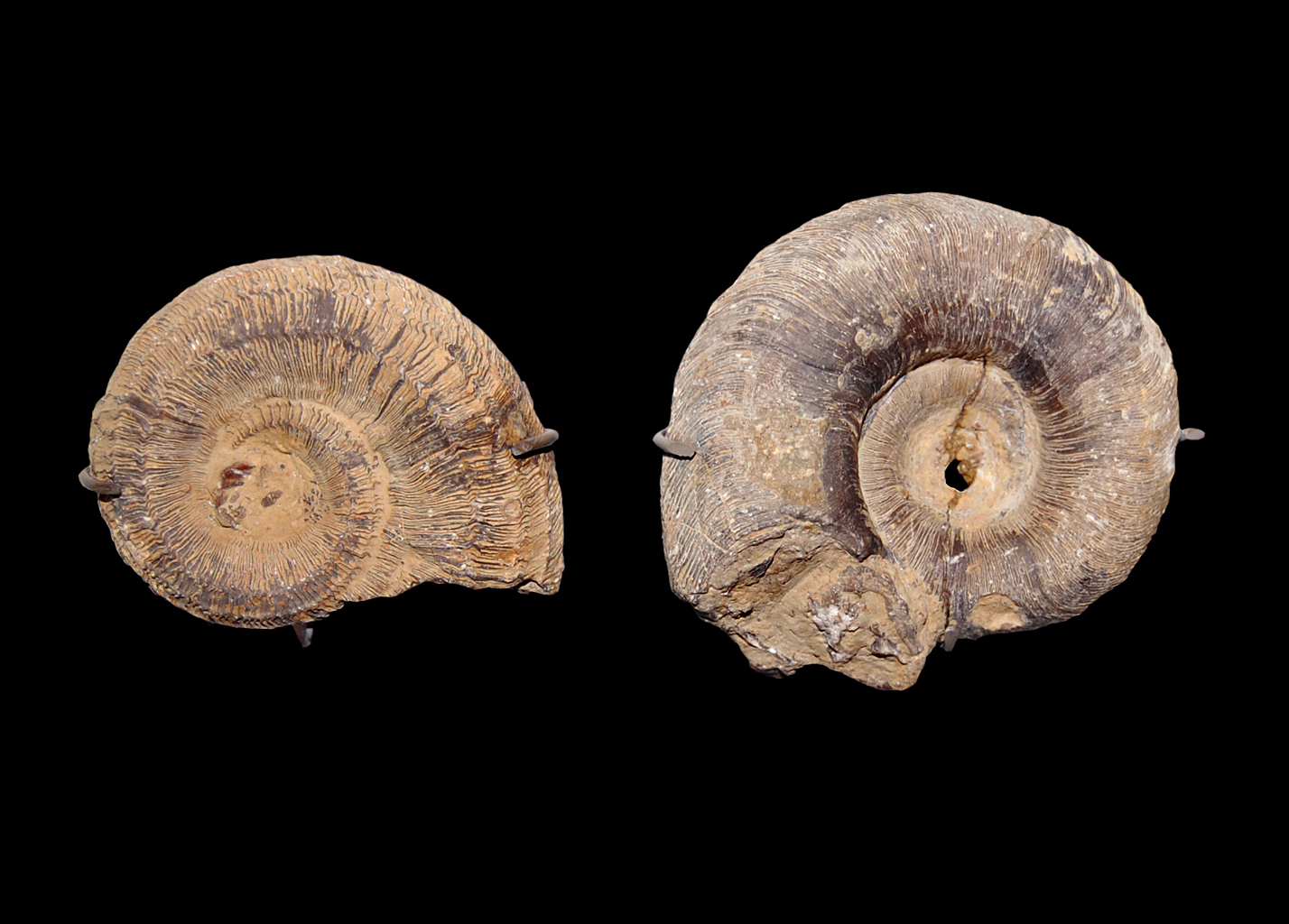

Scientific classification
- Kingdom: Animalia
- Phylum: Mollusca
- Class: Gastropoda
- Family: †Euomphalidae
- Genus: †Poleumita; Clarke & Ruedemann, 1903

Species
- † Poleumita alatum; † Poleumita anabarica; † Poleumita crenulata; † Poleumita discors; † Poleumita gyrans; † Poleumita haliburtoni; † Poleumita hudsonica; † Poleumita myeri; † Poleumita prosseri; † Poleumita rugaelineata; † Poleumita rugosa; † Poleumita scamnata; † Poleumita semiplanus; † Poleumita sulcata; † Poleumita walmstedti

Synonyms
- Polytropina; Polytropis

= Poleumita =

Poleumita Temporal range: Late Silurian

Extinct genus of gastropods

Poleumita is an extinct genus of medium-sized sea snails, fossil marine gastropods in the family Euomphalidae. This genus is known from the Silurian period.
