= Chaunograptus =

Chaunograptus Temporal range: Burgess Shale

Scientific classification
- Kingdom: Animalia
- Phylum: Hemichordata
- Class: Pterobranchia
- Subclass: Graptolithina
- Genus: †Chaunograptus

Genus of marine worm-like animals

Chaunograptus is a genus of putative graptolite known from the Middle Cambrian Burgess Shale. 11 specimens of Chaunograptus are known from the Greater Phyllopod bed, where they comprise 0.02% of the community.

== Species ==
- Chaunograptus contortus
- Chaunograptus gemmatus
- Chaunograptus scandens
