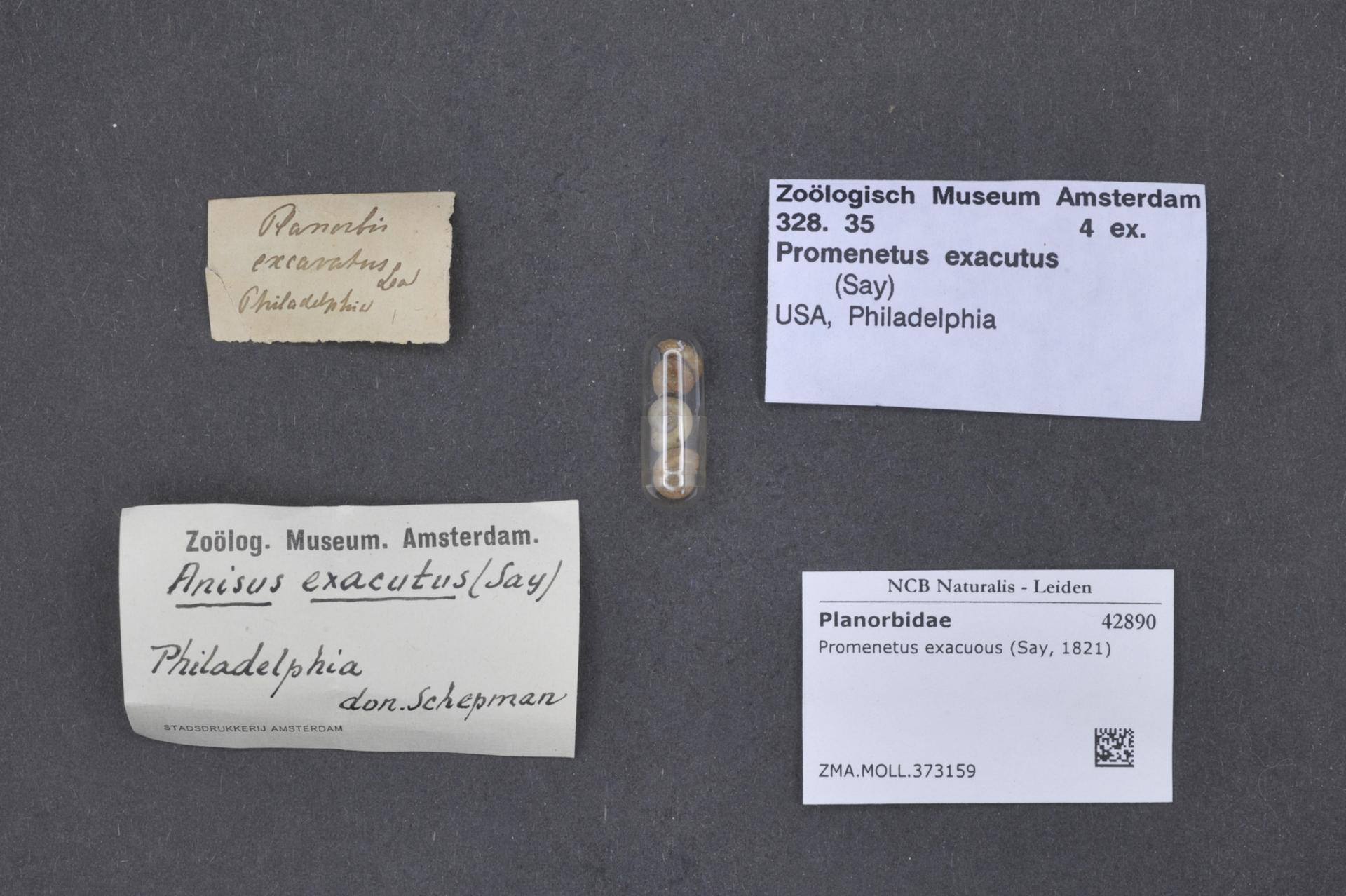

Conservation status
- Secure (NatureServe)

Scientific classification
- Kingdom: Animalia
- Phylum: Mollusca
- Class: Gastropoda
- Superorder: Hygrophila
- Family: Planorbidae
- Genus: Promenetus
- Species: P. exacuous

Binomial name
- Promenetus exacuous (Say, 1821)

= Promenetus exacuous =

Species of mollusc

Promenetus exacuous is a species of gastropods belonging to the family Planorbidae.

The species is found in Northern America.
