= Promenetus =

Scientific classification
- Kingdom: Animalia
- Phylum: Mollusca
- Class: Gastropoda
- Superorder: Hygrophila
- Family: Planorbidae
- Subfamily: Planorbinae
- Tribe: Helisomatini
- Genus: Promenetus; Baker, 1935

Genus of freshwater snails

Promenetus is a genus of gastropods belonging to the family Planorbidae.

The species of this genus are found in Northern America.

Species:

- Promenetus exacuous (Say, 1821)
- Promenetus umbilicatellus (Cockerell, 1887)
