= Sinutropis =

Sinutropis Temporal range: Upper Silurian

Scientific classification
- Kingdom: Animalia
- Phylum: Mollusca
- Class: Gastropoda
- Family: †Euomphalidae
- Genus: †Sinutropis; Perner, 1903

Type species
- † Sinutropis esthetica Perner, 1903

Genus of gastropods

Sinutropis is a genus of fossil sea snails, extinct euomphalid archaeogastropods from the Upper Silurian.

== Description ==
The shell has rounded whorls and a deep rounded sinus on the upper lip of the aperture in place of the typical exhalent angulation of most related genera. Otherwise the shell is not obviously ornamented.

== Species ==
According to the Paleobiology Database, the following species are included in this genus:

- Sinutropis esthetica Perner, 1903
- Sinutropis interrumpens Perner, 1903
- Sinutropis spiralis Rohr, 1988
- Sinutropis tenera Perner, 1903
