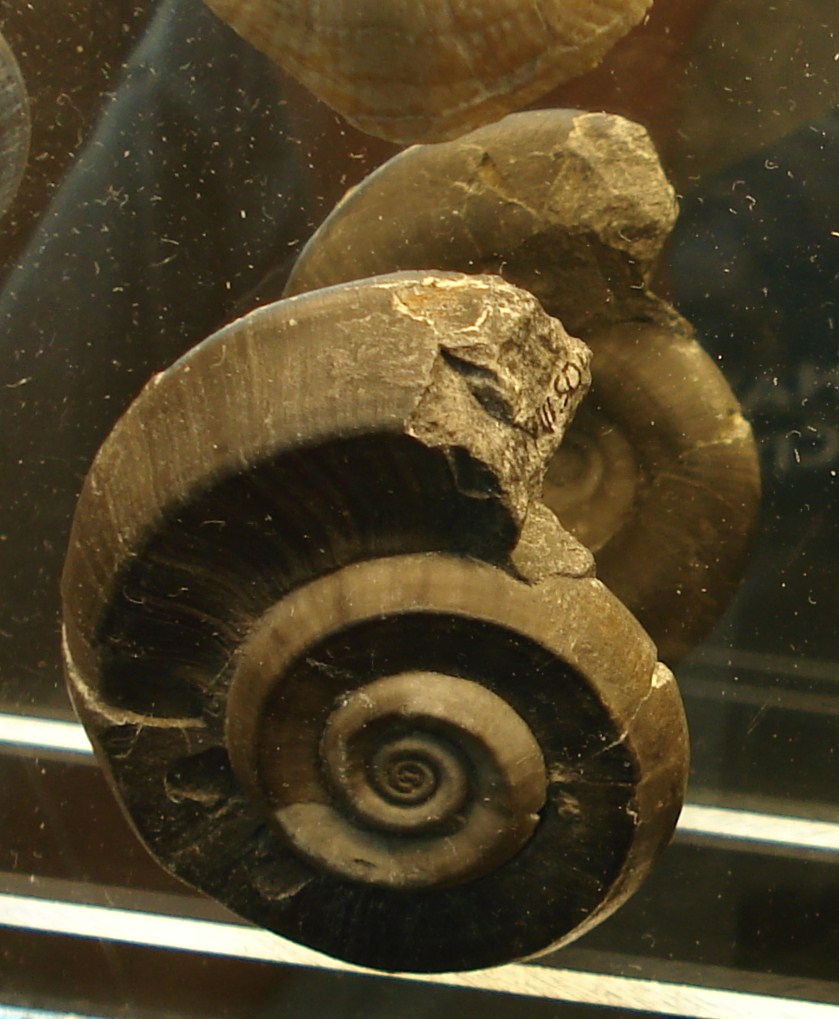
- A specimen of Euomphalus pentangulatus on display at the Paleontological Museum in Munich

Scientific classification
- Kingdom: Animalia
- Phylum: Mollusca
- Class: Gastropoda
- Superfamily: †Euomphaloidea
- Family: †Euomphalidae; White, 1877

Genera
- See text

Synonyms
- Schizostomatidae Bronn, 1849 (inv.); Euomphalopteridae Bronn, 1849 (inv.); Polytropidae Ulrich, 1897 (inv.); Straparollinae Cossmann, 1916; Poleumitidae Wenz, 1938

= Euomphalidae =

Extinct family of gastropods

Euomphalidae is an extinct family of Paleozoic to early Mesozoic marine molluscs which may be gastropods with anisostrophically coiled shells (according to the taxonomy of the Gastropoda by Bouchet & Rocroi, 2005). The shells show a selenizone.

== Genera ==
Genera in the family Euomphalidae include:

- Acanthonema
- Alaionema
- Amphiscapha
- Anisostoma
- Araeonema - synonym: Palaeoturbina
- Austerum
- Bicarina
- Biformispira
- Centrifugus - synonym: Hisingeria
- Coelodiscus C.-C.Jao, 1941 (unaccepted)
- Cylicioscapha
- Discotropis
- Eleutherospira
- Elkoceras
- Euomphalopsis
- Euomphalus J. de C. Sowerby, 1814 - type genus - synonyms: Phymatifer, Schizostoma, Paromphalus.
- Fletcherviewia
- Goldfussoceras
- Hippocampoides
- Kiaeromphalus
- Leptomphalus
- Linsleyella
- Nevadaspira
- Nodeuomphalus
- Novakopteron
- Nummocalcar
- Odontomaria
- Offleyotrochus
- Phanerotinus
- Planotectus
- Platybasis
- Pleuronotus
- Poleumita - synonyms: Polytropina, Polytropis.
- Rhabdotocochlis
- Saturnotropis
- Sinistrispira
- Sinutropis
- Spinicharybdiinae
- Straparollus
- Stusakia
- Tychobrahea
- Weeksia
- Woehrmannia
