= Amphiscapha =

Amphiscapha Temporal range: Penn - L Perm

Scientific classification
- Kingdom: Animalia
- Phylum: Mollusca
- Class: Gastropoda
- Family: †Euomphalidae
- Genus: †Amphiscapha; J. B. Knight, 1942

Extinct genus of gastropods

Amphiscapha is a fossil gastropod mollusk, or less likely a monoplacophoran, genus from the Pennsylvanian and Lower Permian of North and South America, included in the family Euomphalidae. It is sometimes regarded as a subgenus of Straparollus, S. (Amphiscapha) Knight 1942

== Description ==
The shell in this genus is hyper strophic discoidal, with a flat base and a concave upper side. The location of what is presumed to be the exhalent channel is marked by a smooth or rugose ridge along the upper-outer margin, which lies along the edge of a flat to concave outer rim.
