= Westonoceratidae =

Westonoceratidae Temporal range: M Ord - L Sil

Scientific classification
- Kingdom: Animalia
- Phylum: Mollusca
- Class: Cephalopoda
- Subclass: Nautiloidea
- Order: †Discosorida
- Family: †Westonoceratidae; Flower & Teichert 1957

Extinct family of molluscs

Westonoceratidae are exogastric, mostly compressed, Discosorida of moderate size from the Middle Ordovician to the Lower Silurian.

The siphuncle is typically close to the convexly curved outer margin of the phragmocone – the chambered part of the shell – taken to be ventral but may be more central in some genera. Connecting rings are thin to moderately thick with inflated bullettes grasping the previous septal foremina. Parietal deposits within the siphuncle from endocones in advanced genera and cameral deposits are found in some.

The Westonoceratidae are derived from the Cyrtogomphoceratidae through the cyrtogomphoceratid, Ulrichoceras. In turn, the Westonoceratidae gave rise to a small group of discosorids, the Lowoceratidae, which form an intermediary step before the Discosoridae.

Two principal lineages have been identified, both stemming from the genus Teichertoceras, a derivative of Ulrichoceras. One goes simply from Westonoceras to Winnipegoceras. The other goes from Faberoceras to Clarkesvillia to Glyptodendron. Faberoceras may also have given rise to Hecatoceras and Reedsoceras and is the likely source for the Lowoceratidae. Two other genera are included, but are separately derived from Ulrichoceras. These are Sinclairoceras and Simardoceras.
