= Winnipegoceras =

Winnipegoceras Temporal range: M-U Ordovician

Scientific classification
- Kingdom: Animalia
- Phylum: Mollusca
- Class: Cephalopoda
- Subclass: Nautiloidea
- Order: †Discosorida
- Family: †Westonoceratidae
- Genus: †Winnipegoceras; Foerste, 1928

Extinct genus of molluscs

Winnipegoceras is an extinct nautiloid genus from the Ordovician belonging to the Order Discosorida.

== Phylogeny ==
Winnipegoceras is included in the discosorid family Westonoceratidae and is derived from Westonoceras. Westonoceratidae have mostly medium to large, compressed, exogastric shells with moderately sized siphuncles composed of short folded back septal necks and generally thin connecting rings with swollen bullettes and which contain internal linings. (Flower & Teichert 1957; Teichert 1964)

== Description ==
Winnipegoceras, named by Foerste (1922) for fossils found near Winnipeg in Manitoba, Canada, is known by it large, slender, compressed, strongly curved exogastric shells; long slender body chamber and siphuncle that is slightly removed from the venter which is the outer, longitudinally convex margin. Siphuncle segments are strongly narrowed at the septal foremina, bullettes swollen, parietal and other internal deposits rarely preserved. (ibid)

== See also ==
- List of nautiloids
