= Westonoceras =

Westonoceras Temporal range: M & U Ordovician

Scientific classification
- Domain: Eukaryota
- Kingdom: Animalia
- Phylum: Mollusca
- Class: Cephalopoda
- Subclass: Nautiloidea
- Order: †Discosorida
- Family: †Westonoceratidae
- Genus: †Westonoceras; Foerste, 1924

Synonyms
- Westenoceras Foerste, 1924

Extinct genus of nautiloid

Westonoceras is an extinct nautiloid genus from the Discosorida that lived during the Middle and Late Ordovician that has been found in North America, Greenland, and Northern Europe. It is the type genus for the Westonoceratidae

== Description ==
The shell of Westonoceras forms a humped exogastric cyrtocone with its greatest height (gibbosity) at the anterior part of the mature phragmocone and posterior body chamber. The early juvenile portion is slender, gently exogastric or straight and rapidly increasing in size. Curvature increases during development. The dorsum, on the longitudinally concave side, is broadly rounded. The venter, on the longitudinally convex side, is narrow.

The siphuncle is located close to the ventral wall. Segments are box-shaped and strongly expanded. Septal necks are strongly recumbent; connecting rings thick, with inflated bullettes. Parietal deposits grow forward from the septal foremina, commonly forming a continuous internal lining. Cameral deposits are common.

== Phylogeny ==
Westonoceras is derived from Teichertoceras by loss of the initial endogastric curvature of the latter. It have rise to Winnipegoceras in becoming more slender and compressed.

== See also ==
- List of nautiloids
