= Lowoceratidae =

Lowoceratidae Temporal range: Middle Silurian

Scientific classification
- Kingdom: Animalia
- Phylum: Mollusca
- Class: Cephalopoda
- Subclass: Nautiloidea
- Order: †Discosorida
- Family: †Lowoceratidae; Flower, 1940

Extinct family of molluscs

The Lowoceratidae is a small family of discosorids, early nautiloid cephalopods, from the Middle Silurian in which the characteristic bullette is found only in early growth stages. Lowoceratids were first found in Southampton Island in the Canadian arctic.

The Lowoceratidae consists so far of only two genera, Lowoceras and Tuylocras, named by Foerste and Savage in 1927 and combined by Flower in 1940 as the Lowoceratidae. Both are strongly compressed, exogastric brevicones with the ventral side more narrowly rounded than the dorsal. Shells enlarge moderately to the middle of the mature body chamber, then contract gently toward the aperture. The siphuncle in each is slightly removed from the ventral margin. The siphuncle of Tuyloceras, genotype T. percurvatum, starts off with slender, subquadrate segments with thick rings and swollen bullettes, but later in life the segments become expanded, rings thinner, and bullettes simple and unswollen. Lowoceras, genotype L. southamptonense, is like Tuylocrdas, but with endocones in the siphuncle like the later Discosorus. (Flower and Teichert 1957, Teichert 1964)

The Lowoceratidae are derived from the Westonoceratidae (Teichert 1964), most likely from Faberoceras, by the suppression of bullettes in the later growth stages. The Discosoridae are their likely descendants.
