= Faberoceras =

Scientific classification
- Domain: Eukaryota
- Kingdom: Animalia
- Phylum: Mollusca
- Class: Cephalopoda
- Subclass: Nautiloidea
- Order: †Discosorida
- Family: †Westonoceratidae
- Genus: †Faberoceras; Flower, 1946

Faberoceras is an extinct genus of prehistoric nautiloid. The nautiloids are a subclass of shelled cephalopods that were once diverse and numerous but are now represented by only a handful of species.

== See also ==
- List of prehistoric nautiloid genera
