= Discosoridae =

Discosoridae Temporal range: Middle Silurian - Middle Devonian

Scientific classification
- Domain: Eukaryota
- Kingdom: Animalia
- Phylum: Mollusca
- Class: Cephalopoda
- Subclass: Nautiloidea
- Order: †Discosorida
- Family: †Discosoridae; Miller, 1889

Extinct family of molluscs

Discosoridae comprise a family of endogastric discosorids (Cephalopoda, Nautiloidea), with endocones in the siphuncle, ranging from the Middle Silurian to Middle Devonian.

== Shell morphology ==
The shell in the Discosoridae is conical, expanding variably with respect to genus. Curvature tends to be slight with the ventral or siphuncular side slightly concave in profile (the endogastric condition), and the opposite dorsal side arched or convex in profile (another endogastric condition).

The siphuncle is composed of broadly rounded segments the increase rapidly in size toward the aperture, with growth. Expansion is commonly greater than that of the shell itself, and lies ventral of the center. Septal necks are short, brims long and recumbent. Connecting rings are thin and poorly known. Bullettes at the apical end of the connecting rings, which grasp the periphery of the previous septal foramina and connect to the inside of the previous septal necks, are never swollen.

Endocones are formed by overlapping parietal deposits that line in inner side of the siphuncle in the apical part of the shell. The internal contour is wavy, in contrast to the straight conical contours of the endocerid endocones, following the general configuration of the siphuncle. The narrow endosiphotube, left within the adapical portion, may contain diaphragms.

Complete shells are rare. Most of the information regarding the family comes from isolated siphuncles

== Origin ==
The Discosoridae are thought to be derived from the Lowoceratidae, a small family of variably exogastric discosorids, probably from Lowoceras the straighter of the two.

== Genera ==
Genera belonging to the Discosoridae include:

Discosorus, type
Alpeboceras
Endodiscosorus
Kayoceras
Stokesovers
and possibly Konglungenoceras unless Cyrtogomphoceratidae.
