= Discosorida =

Discosorida Temporal range: mid Ordovician–late Devonian

Scientific classification
- Kingdom: Animalia
- Phylum: Mollusca
- Class: Cephalopoda
- Subclass: Nautiloidea
- Order: †Discosorida

Extinct order of molluscs

Discosorida are an order of cephalopods that lived from the beginning of the Middle Ordovician, through the Silurian, and into the Devonian. Discosorids are unique in the structure and formation of the siphuncle, the tube that runs through and connects the camerae (chambers) in cephalopods, which unlike those in other orders is zoned longitudinally along the segments rather than laterally. Siphuncle structure indicated that the Discosorida evolved directly from the Plectronoceratida rather than through the more developed Ellesmerocerida, as did the other orders. Finally and most diagnostic, discosorids developed a reinforcing, grommet-like structure in the septal opening of the siphuncle known as the bullette, formed by a thickening of the connecting ring as it draped around the folded back septal neck.

== Evolution ==
The origin of the Discosorida is unknown, thought at one time to be directly from the Plectronocerida. Evolution within the order begins with the lower Middle Ordovician Reudemannoceratidae and from there diverges into three main lineages. Questionable discosorids have been reported as early as the Middle Tremadocian - near the start of the Ordovician, however the first bona fide examples date to the Middle Ordovician.

The diversification of the Discosorida, in terms of genera, peaked at the beginning in the Middle Ordovician (modern Darriwilian stage) followed by a decline in the Upper Ordovician (modern Sandbian and Katian stages) only to peak again in the Middle Silurian. Afterwards their diversity declined drastically and remained low until their end in the late Devonian. Some were endogastrically curved, with the lower, siphuncle side concave, others were exogastrically curved with the same side convex. In some, the aperture was a simple opening. In others, it became contracted into a pattern of slits. In earlier, Ordovician forms, the bullette became quite large and readily noticeable. In later forms, the bullette became reduced, in some to the point of being vestigial.

The Discosoridae, one of the last families to evolve, found in Silurian and questionably in Devonian rocks, are characterized by a rapidly expanding siphuncle with segments that extend into the adjacent chambers, and parietal deposits within the siphuncle that overlap to form endocones.

== Taxonomy ==
The Discosorida include these families, more or less in phylogenetic sequence beginning with the oldest:

Reudemannoceratidae
Cyrtogomphoceratidae
Westonoceratidae
Phragmoceratidae
Lowoceratidae
Discosoridae
Mandaloceratidae
Mesoceratidae

These form three basin evolutionary lineages. The first, formed by the Reudemannoceratidae, Cyrtogomphoceratidae, and Phragmoceratidae, are fundamentally endogastric with the siphuncle near the inside or longitudinally concave curvature. The second, formed by the Westonoceratidae, Lowoceratidae, and Discosoridae, are fundamentally exogastric with the siphuncle near the outside or longitudinally convex curvature, although the Discosoridae are somewhat different. The third, consisting of the Mandaloceratidae and Mesoceratidae are basically straight (orthoconic). Families differ primarily in the structural details of the siphuncle and in the nature of the aperture.

== Ecology ==
Discosorids were probably benthic forms that crawled over the bottom in search of food or safety, or hovered close to the bottom. The general orientation during life was most likely head down, with the aperture of the shell facing the general direction of the sea floor and shell carried above. Nothing is known of what the animal itself may have looked like; how many tentacles they had and relative length or how well they may have seen.

== Related taxa ==
In general form the Discosorida resembled the Oncocerida, which lived about the same time, but evolved from a completely different stock. The two convergent groups differ in their internal detail.
