= 2025 in paleomalacology =

Several new taxa of fossil molluscs were described during the year 2025, which also saw other significant discoveries and events related to molluscan paleontology.

== Ammonites ==
Name	Novelty	Status	Authors	Age	Type locality	Location	Notes	Image
Acuticlymenia	Gen. et sp. nov	Valid	Becker	Devonian (Famennian)	Achguig Formation	Morocco	A member of the family Rectoclymeniidae. The type species is A. tafilensis.	
Anapachydiscus haegerti	Sp. nov	Valid	McLachlan	Late Cretaceous (Campanian)	Northumberland Formation	Canada (British Columbia)	A member of the family Pachydiscidae.	
Argolites nodosus	Sp. nov	Valid	Vörös in Vörös et al.	Middle Triassic (Ladinian)	Buchenstein Formation	Hungary	A member of Ceratitoidea belonging to the family Danubitidae.	
Arpadites bercsenyii	Sp. nov	Valid	Vörös in Vörös et al.	Middle Triassic (Ladinian)	Buchenstein Formation	Hungary	A member of Ceratitoidea belonging to the family Danubitidae.	
Bajocia paiardinii	Sp. nov		Chandler & Cresta	Middle Jurassic (Bajocian)		Italy	A member of the family Stephanoceratidae.	
Beudanticeras vinei	Sp. nov	Valid	Day in Jell & Cook			Australia		
Beulia langei	Sp. nov	Valid	Becker	Devonian		Germany	A member of the family Hoeveliidae.	
Boreophylloceras subtile	Sp. nov	Valid	Igolnikov	Early Cretaceous		Russia (Krasnoyarsk Krai)		
Bouleiceras goyi	Sp. nov		Pavia	Early Jurassic (Toarcian)	Uanei Formation	Somalia		
Bouleiceras lanceolatum	Sp. nov		Pavia	Early Jurassic (Toarcian)	Uanei Formation	Somalia		
Costaclymenia constricta	Sp. nov	Valid	Becker	Devonian (Famennian)	Achguig Formation	Morocco	A member of the family Costaclymeniidae.	
Cravenoceras ulytauense	Sp. nov	Valid	Nikolaeva	Carboniferous		Kazakhstan		
Cyrtoclymenia riemkensis	Sp. nov	Valid	Becker	Devonian			A member of the family Cyrtoclymeniidae.	
Cyrtoclymenia variseptata	Sp. nov	Valid	Becker	Devonian (Famennian)	Achguig Formation	Morocco	A member of the family Cyrtoclymeniidae.	
Cyrtoclymenia vermillionensis	Sp. nov	Valid	Becker	Devonian			A member of the family Cyrtoclymeniidae.	
Demarezites quirozii	Sp. nov	Valid	Alanis-Pavón et al.	Permian	Las Delicias Formation	Mexico	A member of the family Cyclolobidae.	
Desmoceras (Pseudouhligella) sanrikucum	Sp. nov	Valid	Matsukawa & Shibata	Early Cretaceous	Hiraiga Formation	Japan		
Desmoceras (Pseudouhligella) trigonum	Sp. nov	Valid	Yoshinaga, Shigeta & Maeda	Early Cretaceous (Albian)	Enokuchi Formation	Japan		
Douvilleiceras bifurcatum	Sp. nov	Valid	Matsukawa & Shibata	Early Cretaceous	Hiraiga Formation	Japan		
Eckhardites atmensis	Sp. nov	Valid	Mitta in Mitta, Zenina & Meleshin	Middle Jurassic (Bathonian)		Russia	A member of the family Cardioceratidae. Published online in 2026, but the issue date is listed as December 2025.	
Ephamulina monotuberculata	Sp. nov	Valid	Matsukawa & Shibata	Early Cretaceous (Aptian)	Hiraiga Formation	Japan	A member of the family Anisoceratidae.	
Eteohemimicroceras	Gen. et comb. nov	Valid	Meister et al.	Early Jurassic (Sinemurian)		France; Germany; United Kingdom	A member of the family Eoderoceratidae. The type species is "Microceras" serpentinum Trueman & Williams (1927); genus also includes "Ammonites" subplanicosta Oppel (1856), "Ammonites" vitreus Simpson (1855), "Bifericeras" juengsti Guérin-Franiatte & Hoffmann (1984) and "Ammonites" lohbergensis Emerson (1870).	
Eubostrychoceras perplexum	Sp. nov	Valid	Aiba	Late Cretaceous (Santonian)	Haborogawa Formation	Japan	A member of the family Nostoceratidae.	
Goniatites amarensis	Sp. nov	Valid	Korn & Ebbighausen	Carboniferous (Viséan)		Morocco	A member of the family Goniatitidae.	
Herbigites	Gen. et sp. nov		Becker	Devonian (Givetian)		Morocco	A member of Pharciceratoidea. The type species is H. mdourensis.	
Hourqueigella	Gen. et comb. nov		Frau	Early Cretaceous (Aptian)		France	A member of the family Acrioceratidae; a new genus for "Anisoceras" carcitanense Matheron (1880).	
Hybonoticeras neumayri	Sp. nov	Valid	Grigore	Late Jurassic (Kimmeridgian)		Romania	A member of the family Aspidoceratidae.	
Hybopeltoceras olorizi	Sp. nov		Sarti et al.	Late Jurassic (Tithonian)	Bugarone Formation	Italy	A member of the family Aspidoceratidae.	
Idiohamites pacificum	Sp. nov	Valid	Matsukawa & Shibata	Early Cretaceous	Hiraiga Formation	Japan	A member of the family Anisoceratidae.	
Itierella	Gen. et sp. nov	Valid	Pictet, Hugon & Pierangelini	Early Cretaceous (Valanginian)	Grand Essert Formation	France	A member of the family Neocomitidae. The type species is I. melognensis.	
Jaeniceras	Gen. et comb. nov	Valid	Parent, Ramos-Agustino & García-Alacid	Late Jurassic (Tithonian)		Spain	A member of the family Ataxioceratidae. The type species is "Perisphinctes" ponti Fallot & Termier (1923); genus also includes "Djurjuriceras" anularium Olóriz (1978) and "Djurjuriceras" armonicum Olóriz (1978).	
Jurienella	Gen. et comb. nov	Valid	Pictet & Bulot	Early Cretaceous (Hauterivian)		France; Switzerland	A member of the family Neocomitidae. The type species is "Breistrofferella" peyroulensis Atrops, Autran & Reboulet (1996).	
Katrabocaites	Gen. et comb. et sp. nov	Valid	Vörös in Vörös et al.	Middle Triassic (Ladinian)		Hungary; Croatia?	A member of the family Trachyceratidae. The type species is "Anolcites" laczkoi Diener (1899); genus also includes new species K. montisregis.	
Lanceoclymenia	Gen. et comb. et sp. et nom. nov	Valid	Becker	Devonian		Germany; Poland	A member of the family Rectoclymeniidae. The type species is "Clymenia" subflexuosa Münster (1840); genus also includes L. dziki (a replacement name for Cyrtoclymenia acuta Czarnocki, 1989) and a new species L. kaufmanni.	
Lechites (Lechites) komorii	Sp. nov	Valid	Matsukawa & Shibata	Early Cretaceous	Hiraiga Formation	Japan	A member of the family Baculitidae.	
Limoclymenia	Gen. et comb. nov	Valid	Becker	Devonian		Germany	A member of the family Cymaclymeniidae. The type species is "Cyrtoclymenia" tetragona Schmidt (1924).	
Lineaclymenia	Gen. et comb. nov	Valid	Becker	Devonian		Kazakhstan	A member of the family Cyrtoclymeniidae. The type species is "Protactoclymenia" cara Nikolaeva & Bogoslovsky (2005).	
Martiniclymenia	Gen. et sp. nov	Valid	Becker	Devonian (Famennian)	Achguig Formation	Morocco	A member of the family Platyclymeniidae. The type species is M. tenens.	
Menabites (Delawarella) landmani	Sp. nov	Valid	Sealey & Lucas	Late Cretaceous (Campanian)	Mancos Shale	United States (New Mexico)	A member of the family Collignoniceratidae.	
Mereoceras	Gen. et comb. et sp. nov	Valid	Korn	Carboniferous (Bashkirian)		Spain	A member of Schistoceratoidea. Genus includes "Paralegoceras" percostatum Schmidt (1955) and a new species M. cantabricum.	
Merocanites consequius	Sp. nov	Valid	Korn	Carboniferous (Viséan)	Zrigat Formation	Morocco	A member of the family Prolecanitidae.	
Nummoclymenia	Gen. et sp. nov	Valid	Becker	Devonian			A member of the family Cyrtoclymeniidae. The type species is N. planata.	
Orientosirenites insolitus	Sp. nov	Valid	Konstantinov	Late Triassic (Carnian)		Russia (Sakha Republic)	A member of the family Sirenitidae.	
Oufranoceras	Gen. et sp. nov		Becker	Devonian (Givetian)		Morocco	A member of the family Taouzitidae. The type species is O. perliratum.	
Owenites golozubovi	Sp. nov	Valid	Zakharov et al.	Early Triassic (Olenekian)		Russia (Primorsky Krai)		
Paracheloniceras kazuoi	Sp. nov	Valid	Matsukawa & Shibata	Early Cretaceous	Hiraiga Formation	Japan	A member of the family Douvilleiceratidae.	
Paracyrtoclymenia	Gen. et comb. et sp. nov	Valid	Becker	Devonian		United States	A member of the family Cyrtoclymeniidae. The type species is "Cyrtoclymenia" strigata House (1962); genus also includes P. campanulata (Richter, 1848), as well as new species P. hagenensis.	
Paradamesites	Gen. et comb. et sp. nov	Valid	Nishimura & Maeda	Late Cretaceous (Turonian–Campanian)		Angola; India; Japan; Madagascar; Russia (Sakhalin Oblast); South Africa; Spain	A member of Desmoceratinae. The type species is "Ammonites" sugata Forbes (1846); genus also includes new species P. rectus, as well as P. compactus (Hoepen, 1921), P. rabei (Collignon, 1961), P. tsianalokyensis (Collignon, 1961).	
Paradicostella	Gen. et sp. nov	Valid	Pictet, Hugon & Pierangelini	Early Cretaceous (Valanginian)	Grand Essert Formation	France	A member of the family Neocomitidae. The type species is P. hautevillelompnesensis.	
Paranolcites	Gen. et sp. nov	Valid	Vörös in Vörös et al.	Middle Triassic (Ladinian)	Buchenstein Formation	Hungary	A member of the family Trachyceratidae. The type species is P. budaii.	
Phyllopachyceras iwatense	Sp. nov	Valid	Matsukawa & Shibata	Early Cretaceous (Aptian)	Miyako Group	Japan		
Pinterites	Gen. et comb. nov	Valid	Vörös in Vörös et al.	Middle Triassic (Ladinian)	Esino Limestone	Hungary	A member of the family Trachyceratidae. The type species is "Trachyceras" laricum Mojsisovics (1882).	
Plicoclymenia	Gen. et comb. nov	Valid	Becker	Devonian		Germany	A member of the family Cyrtoclymeniidae. The type species is "Clymenia" cincta Münster (1839); genus also includes "Clymenia" plicata Münster (1839), "Clymenia" fasciata Phillips (1841) and a new species P. cadiconica.	
Preflorianites lelikovi	Sp. nov	Valid	Zakharov et al.	Early Triassic (Olenekian)		Russia (Primorsky Krai)		
Prorsiclymenia	Gen. et comb. nov	Valid	Becker	Devonian		Germany	A member of the family Cyrtoclymeniidae. The type species is "Clymenia" involuta Wedekind (1908); genus also includes P. crassa (Wedekind, 1914).	
Protactoclymenia franconica	Sp. nov	Valid	Becker	Devonian		Germany	A member of the family Cyrtoclymeniidae.	
Protopharciceras	Gen. et comb. nov		Becker	Devonian (Givetian)		Morocco	A member of Pharciceratoidea. The type species is "Pharciceras" bidentatum Petter (1959).	
Pseudolithancylus	Gen. et sp. nov	Valid	Matsukawa & Shibata	Early Cretaceous	Hiraiga Formation	Japan	A member of the family Ancyloceratidae. The type species is P. tohokuense.	
Puzosia (Puzosia) shimizui	Sp. nov	Valid	Matsukawa & Shibata	Early Cretaceous	Miyako Group	Japan		
Rectoclymenia intercostata	Sp. nov	Valid	Becker	Devonian			A member of the family Rectoclymeniidae.	
Rhenoclymenia	Gen. et comb. nov	Valid	Becker	Devonian		Germany	A member of the family Cyrtoclymeniidae. The type species is "Clymenia" phillipsi Wedekind (1908).	
Sanctaclymenia	Gen. et comb. et sp. nov	Valid	Becker	Devonian		Germany; Morocco; Poland	A member of the family Cymaclymeniidae. The type species is "Rectoclymenia" retrusa Czarnocki (1989); genus also includes new species S. extrema.	
Schmidtoclymenia	Gen. et comb. nov	Valid	Becker	Devonian		Germany	A new genus for "Cyrtoclymenia" acuta Schmidt (1924).	
Sigmoclymenia	Gen. et comb. et sp. nov	Valid	Becker	Devonian (Famennian)		Germany; Kazakhstan; Spain	A member of the family Cymaclymeniidae. The type species is "Falciclymenia" mirabilis Nikolaeva & Bogoslovsky (2005); genus also includes "F." falcifera Brügge (1973) and "F." cyrtostriata Kullmann (1960), as well as new species S. brueggei Becker (2025).	
Xenoglyphioceras	Gen. et sp. nov	Valid	Korn	Carboniferous (Viséan)	Zrigat Formation	Morocco	A member of the family Ferganoceratidae. The type species is X. eidos.	
Yakutosirenites selivanovae	Sp. nov	Valid	Konstantinov	Late Triassic (Carnian)		Russia (Sakha Republic)	A member of the family Sirenitidae.	

=== Ammonite research ===
- * A study on factors influencing the spatial distribution of ammonites in the aftermath of the Permian–Triassic extinction event is published by Guenser et al. (2025).
- Đaković, Mrdak & Gawlick (2025) describe three assemblages of Anisian ammonoids from the Komarani and Bulog formations (Montenegro), including fossils of Ptychites rugifer, Megaphyllites obolus, Parakellnerites rothpletzi, Apleuroceras decrescens, Proteusites labiatus, Tropigastrites lahontanus, Proarcestes pannonicus, Proarcestes subtridentinus and Aristoptychites sp. extending known geographical ranges of these taxa.
- Guo et al. (2025) study the evolution of complexity of ammonoid sututres, providing evidence of morphological similarity of sutures lasting longer in earlier-occurring ammonite groups than in later-occurring ones.
- Description and study on the biostratigraphy of the ammonite assemblage from the Jurassic strata from Sierra de Reyes (Mendoza Province, Argentina) is published by Riccardi, Gulisano & Gutierrez-Pleimling (2025).
- A study on the biostratigraphy of the ammonite faunas from the Aalenian Achdorf Formation (Germany) is published by Dietze et al. (2025).
- A study on the composition of the Middle Jurassic ammonite fauna from the Shal Formation (Iran) is published by Majidifard & Wilmsen (2025).
- A study on the morphology and growth of Rehmannia richei is published by Douas Bengoudira et al. (2025).
- An ammonite specimen belonging to the genus Rehmannia, preserving paired Praetriaptychus aptychi within its body chamber and likely close to their original position, is described from the Jurassic (probably Callovian) strata from Quintanas de Hormiguera (Palencia, Spain) by Martínez, Ureta & García-Frank (2025).
- Jantschke et al. (2025) report the discovery of a diverse ammonite assemblage from the Oxfordian strata of the Sengenthal Formation (Germany).
- Evidence of preservation of ovaries with egg remains is reported in a specimen of Neochetoceras cf. praecursor from the Kimmeridgian strata in the Solnhofen region (Germany) by Klug et al. (2025).
- Taxonomic revision of the collection of Kimmeridgian ammonites from four sections in the Kachchh Basin (India) is published by Pandey et al. (2025).
- Schweigert, Scherzinger & Schlampp (2025) revise the type species of the genus Progeronia, "Perisphinctes" progeron, and consider it to be a nomen dubium.
- Vašíček & Skupien (2025) revise the composition of the haploceratid assemblage from the Jurassic–Cretaceous transition from the Štramberk Limestone (Czech Republic).
- Cadena, Bustos & Lehmann (2025) describe bochianitid fossils from the Valanginian and Hauterivian strata of the Rosablanca Formation (Colombia), extending known range of Bochianites neocomiensis and Janenschites oosteri to the northern part of South America.
- Conti et al. (2025) report a mass occurrence of ammonites from a leptoceratoidid-dominated assemblage from the Barremian Maiolica Formation (Italy), including both heteromorphic and normal coiled specimens whose coexistence might have been enabled by water column stratification.
- Fosso Menkem et al. (2025) describe fossil material of Albian ammonites from the Kribi-Campo sub-Basin (Cameroon), assign the fossil-bearing deposits to the Mundeck Formation, and interpret the studied fossils as evidence of a full connection between the North and South Atlantic during the lower Albian.
- Wani (2025) studies morphology and ontogeny of Pachydesmoceras denisonianum on the basis of data from a conch from the Cretaceous Karai Formation (India), interpreted as indicating that constrictions and septal spacings are not always directly linked in the studied ammonite.
- Xing et al. (2025) describe a new invertebrate assemblage from the Cretaceous amber from Myanmar, preserving ammonites alongside terrestrial arthropods.
- The first North American record of Masiaposites is reported from the Turonian strata of the Mancos Shale (New Mexico, United States) by Lucas et al. (2025).
- Shigeta, Jenks & Eichhorn (2025) study the shell development of Neogastroplites muelleri throughout its ontogeny, and link the intraspecific variation of shells of members of this species to large differences in the morphology of the initial chambers, influencing later shell growth.
- Tanabe & Misaki (2025) describe two new lower jaws of pachydiscids from the Coniacian to Santonian strata of the Yezo Group (Japan), and study the morphological characteristics of the jaw apparatuses of pachydiscids significant for taxonomy and ecological reconstructions.
- A study on the ontogenetic shell development of Yabeiceras orientale, Y. cf. manasoaense, Forresteria yezoensis and F. muramotoi is published by Inose & Watanabe (2025).
- A study on shell breakages in specimens of Hoploscaphites nicolletii from the Upper Cretaceous Fox Hills Formation (South Dakota, United States), interpreted as evidence of lethal attacks by durophagous predators, is published by Tajika et al. (2025).
- Description of fossil material of Placenticeras costatum and P. meeki from the Maastrichtian strata from the Raton Basin (New Mexico, United States), representing the youngest confirmed records of members of the genus Placenticeras worldwide, is published by Sealey & Lucas (2025).
- Tajika et al. (2025) study the variation in the whorl expansion rate within multiple Late Cretaceous ammonite species, and find no evidence of a strong correlation between the studied variation and species duration or geographic distribution.
- Peterman et al. (2025) study the hydromechanical properties of ornamentation of ammonite shells, and find that ornamentation patterns with intermediate coarseness, reducing rocking behavior without significant reduction of swimming efficiency, became more abundant during the Mesozoic, likely as a result of hydromechanical selective pressures.
- Machalski et al. (2025) describe new ammonite specimens from the Rødvig Formation (Denmark) representing the genera Hoploscaphites, Baculites and Fresvillia, and interpret the majority of the studied specimens as survivors of the Cretaceous–Paleogene extinction event.

== Other cephalopods ==
Name	Novelty	Status	Authors	Age	Type locality	Location	Notes	Images
Aetorhynchus	Gen. et sp. nov		Ikegami et al.	Late Cretaceous (Cenomanian)	Yezo Group	Japan	A squid belonging to the group Oegopsida and the family Paleothysanoteuthidae. The type species is A. incisus.	
Aifinautilus	Gen. et 2 sp. nov	Valid	Korn & Hairapetian	Permian (Wuchiapingian)	Hambast Formation	Iran	A member of Nautilida belonging to the superfamily Grypoceratoidea and the family Ocunautilidae. The type species is A. icanus Korn & Hairapetian; genus also includes A. hebes Korn & Ghaderi.	
Alibashinautilus	Gen. et 2 sp. nov	Valid	Korn & Ghaderi	Permian (Wuchiapingian and Changhsingian)	Julfa Formation	Iran	A member of the family Rhiphaeoceratidae. The type species is A. vetus; genus also includes A. ambiguus .	
Amblyscuthes	Gen. et 2 sp. nov		Ikegami et al.	Late Cretaceous (Cenomanian to Campanian)	Yezo Group	Japan	A squid belonging to the group Oegopsida and the family Scuthoteuthidae. The type species is A. apterus; genus also includes A. pyrgoides.	
Angulithes rayi	Sp. nov		Ghosh, Bose & Das	Eocene	Jaisalmer Basin	India	A member of Nautiloidea.	
Aspasmoteuthis	Gen. et sp. nov		Ikegami et al.	Late Cretaceous (Coniacian)	Yezo Group	Japan	A squid belonging to the group Oegopsida and the family Pachypteroteuthidae. The type species is A. peltatus.	
Astathogephyra	Gen. et 2 sp. nov		Ikegami et al.	Late Cretaceous (Cenomanian to Coniacian)	Yezo Group	Japan	A squid belonging to the group Oegopsida and the family Pachypteroteuthidae. The type species is A. metis; genus also includes A. himatium.	
Azarinautilus	Gen. et 2 sp. nov	Valid	Korn & Ghaderi	Permian (Wuchiapingian)	Julfa Formation	Iran	A member of Nautilida belonging to the superfamily Grypoceratoidea and the family Ocunautilidae. The type species is A. nahidae Korn & Ghaderi; genus also includes A. phorminx Korn & Hairapetian.	
Baghuknautilus	Gen. et sp. nov	Valid	Korn & Hairapetian	Permian (Wuchiapingian)	Hambast Formation	Iran	A member of Nautilida belonging to the superfamily Liroceratoidea and the family Julfanautilidae. The type species is B. aplomorphus.	
Bathmidoteuthis	Gen. et sp. nov		Ikegami et al.	Late Cretaceous (Cenomanian to Campanian)	Yezo Group	Japan	A squid belonging to the group Oegopsida and the family Haboroteuthidae. The type species is B. altus.	
Beloitoceras uuemoisense	Sp. nov	Valid	Kröger	Ordovician (Katian)	Adila Formation	Estonia	A member of the family Oncoceratidae.	
Camptoteuthis	Gen. et 2 sp. nov		Ikegami et al.	Late Cretaceous (Cenomanian to Turonian)	Yezo Group	Japan	A squid belonging to family Loliginidae. The type species is C. acrorhynchus; genus also includes C. cunabuli.	
Catantopteryx	Gen. et sp. nov		Ikegami et al.	Late Cretaceous (Cenomanian to Turonian)	Yezo Group	Japan	A squid belonging to the group Oegopsida and the family Pachypteroteuthidae. The type species is C. altilis.	
Celeroliroceras	Sp. nov	Valid	Korn & Ghaderi	Permian (Wuchiapingian)	Julfa Formation	Iran	A member of the family Liroceratidae. The type species C. celere.	
Columenoceras kyushuense	Sp. nov	Valid	Niko	Silurian (Ludlow)	Gionyama Formation	Japan	A member of the family Geisonoceratidae.	
Corotainoceras	Gen. et sp. nov	Valid	Korn & Ghaderi	Permian (Wuchiapingian)	Julfa Formation	Iran	A member of the family Tainoceratidae. The type species is C. inerme.	
Curtoceras meyeri	Sp. nov	Valid	Aubrechtová & Korn	Ordovician		Germany		
Cycloceras ofunatoense	Sp. nov	Valid	Niko & Ehiro	Permian (Changhsingian)	Toyoma Formation	Japan		
Cyrtorizoceras hariense	Sp. nov	Valid	Kröger	Ordovician (Katian)	Kõrgessaare Formation	Estonia	A member of the family Oncoceratidae.	
Danoceras oviforme	Sp. nov	Valid	Kröger	Ordovician (Katian)	Kõrgessaare Formation	Estonia	A member of the family Diestoceratidae.	
Danoceras piersalense	Comb. nov	Valid	(Teichert)	Ordovician	Moe Formation	Estonia	A member of the family Diestoceratidae; moved from "Dowlingoceras" piersalense Teichert (1930).	
Danoceras vohilaidense	Sp. nov	Valid	Kröger	Ordovician (Katian)	Adila Formation	Estonia	A member of the family Diestoceratidae.	
Deckeroceras balticum	Sp. nov	Valid	Kröger	Ordovician (Katian)	Adila Formation	Estonia	A member of the family Uranoceratidae.	
Discoceras paopense	Sp. nov	Valid	Kröger	Ordovician (Katian)	Kõrgessaare Formation	Estonia	A member of the family Trocholitidae.	
Domatoceras canonium	Sp. nov	Valid	Korn & Ghaderi	Permian (Wuchiapingian)	Hambast Formation	Iran		
Domatoceras elegantulum	Sp. nov	Valid	Korn & Ghaderi	Permian (Wuchiapingian)	Julfa Formation	Iran		
Domatoceras floweri	Sp. nov	Valid	Sealey & Lucas	Permian	San Andres Formation	United States (New Mexico)		
Domatoceras multituberculatum	Sp. nov	Valid	Korn & Ghaderi	Permian (Wuchiapingian)	Julfa Formation	Iran		
Domatoceras myloide	Sp. nov	Valid	Korn & Ghaderi	Permian (Wuchiapingian)	Hambast Formation	Iran		
Domatoceras ocomphalum	Sp. nov	Valid	Korn & Ghaderi	Permian (Wuchiapingian)	Hambast Formation	Iran		
Dowlingoceras tornense	Sp. nov	Valid	Kröger	Ordovician (Katian)	Adila Formation	Estonia	A member of the family Diestoceratidae.	
Ephippiorthoceras vormsiense	Sp. nov	Valid	Kröger	Ordovician (Katian)	Adila Formation	Estonia	A member of the family Proteoceratidae.	
Epitainoceras	Gen. et sp. et comb. nov	Valid	Korn & Hairapetian	Permian (Wuchiapingian)	Hambast Formation	Azerbaijan; Iran	A member of the family Tainoceratidae. The type species is E. lutense; genus also includes "Nautilus dorso" plicatus Abich (1878).	
Fididomatoceras	Gen. et sp. et comb. nov	Valid	Korn & Ghaderi	Permian (Wuchiapingian)	Julfa Formation	Azerbaijan; Iran	A member of Nautilida belonging to the superfamily Grypoceratoidea and the family Domatoceratidae. The type species is F. intracostatum; genus also includes "Domatoceras" gracile Shimansky (1965).	
Foordiceras ascetum	Sp. nov	Valid	Korn & Hairapetian	Permian (Wuchiapingian)	Hambast Formation	Iran	A member of Nautilida belonging to the superfamily Pleuronautiloidea and the family Foordiceratidae.	
Foordiceras decacanthum	Sp. nov	Valid	Korn & Hairapetian	Permian (Wuchiapingian)	Hambast Formation	Iran	A member of Nautilida belonging to the superfamily Pleuronautiloidea and the family Foordiceratidae.	
Foordiceras eicosacanthum	Sp. nov	Valid	Korn & Hairapetian	Permian (Wuchiapingian)	Hambast Formation	Iran	A member of Nautilida belonging to the superfamily Pleuronautiloidea and the family Foordiceratidae.	
Gerontoteuthis	Gen. et sp. nov		Ikegami et al.	Late Cretaceous (Cenomanian)	Yezo Group	Japan	A squid belonging to the group Oegopsida and the family Pachypteroteuthidae. The type species is G. acutissimus.	
Gorbormoceras	Gen. et sp. nov	Valid	Kröger	Ordovician (Katian)	Adila Formation	Estonia	A member of Actinocerida belonging to the family Ormoceratidae. The type species is G. vohilaidense.	
Gorbyoceras clathratoannulatum	Comb. nov	Valid	(Roemer)	Ordovician		Poland	A member of the family Proteoceratidae; moved from "Orthoceras" clathrato-annulatum Roemer (1861).	
Grossiscapula	Gen. et sp. nov		Ikegami et al.	Late Cretaceous (Maastrichtian)	Yezo Group	Japan	A squid belonging to the group Oegopsida and the family Scuthoteuthidae. The type species is G. angusta.	
Hiiumoceras	Gen. et sp. nov	Valid	Kröger	Ordovician (Katian)	Kõrgessaare Formation	Estonia	A member of the family Graciloceratidae. The type species is H. hiiuense.	
Hoplitopteryx	Gen. et sp. nov		Ikegami et al.	Late Cretaceous (Turonian)	Yezo Group	Japan	A squid belonging to the group Oegopsida and the family Haboroteuthidae. The type species is H. solida.	
Hosholmoceras	Gen. et sp. nov	Valid	Kröger	Ordovician (Katian)	Adila Formation	Estonia	A member of the family Cyrtogomphoceratidae. The type species is H. ovalis.	
Isorthoceras luhai	Comb. nov	Valid	(Stumbur)	Ordovician		Estonia	A member of the family Proteoceratidae; moved from "Orthoceras" luhai Stumbur (1956).	
Isorthoceras saaremense	Comb. nov	Valid	(Balashov)	Ordovician		Estonia	A member of the family Proteoceratidae; moved from "Hedstroemoceras" saaremense Balashov (1959).	
Julfanautilus	Gen. et 2 sp. nov	Valid	Korn & Ghaderi	Permian (Wuchiapingian)	Julfa Formation	Iran	A member of Nautilida belonging to the superfamily Liroceratoidea and the family Julfanautilidae. The type species is J. ashourii; genus also includes J. hairapetiani.	
Juroteuthis	Gen. et sp. nov		Ikegami et al.	Late Cretaceous (Turonian to Coniacian)	Yezo Group	Japan	A squid belonging to the group Oegopsida and the family Pachypteroteuthidae. The type species is J. arrectus.	
Kiaeroceras kaebliki	Sp. nov	Valid	Kröger	Ordovician (Katian)	Kõrgessaare Formation	Estonia	A member of the family Cyrtogomphoceratidae.	
Kiaeroceras ormsoense	Sp. nov	Valid	Kröger	Ordovician (Katian)	Kõrgessaare Formation	Estonia	A member of the family Cyrtogomphoceratidae.	
Kiaeroceras urgense	Sp. nov	Valid	Kröger	Ordovician (Katian)	Kõrgessaare Formation	Estonia	A member of the family Cyrtogomphoceratidae.	
Lepidoceras	Gen. et comb. nov	Valid	Manda & Turek	Silurian (Homerian to Ludfordian)	Kopanina Formation	Czech Republic	A member of the family Dawsonoceratidae. The type species is "Cyrtoceras" lepidum Barrande (1866).	
Liroceras choopani	Sp. nov	Valid	Korn & Ghaderi	Permian (Wuchiapingian)	Julfa Formation	Iran		
Liroceras leptum	Sp. nov	Valid	Korn & Hairapetian	Permian (Wuchiapingian)	Hambast Formation	Iran		
Lotharingibelus	Gen. et comb. nov	Valid	Weis et al.	Early Jurassic (Toarcian)		Belgium; France; Germany; Luxembourg	A belemnite belonging to the family Megateuthididae. The type species is "Belemnites" meta Blainville (1827); genus also includes "Belemnites" subgiganteus Branco (1879).	
Lutonautilus	Gen. et 3 sp. nov	Valid	Korn & Hairapetian	Permian (Wuchiapingian)	Hambast Formation	Iran	A member of Nautilida belonging to the family Pleuronautilidae. The type species is L. cratus; genus also includes L. elachus and L. cymus.	
Ocunautilus	Gen. et 3 sp. nov	Valid	Korn & Hairapetian	Permian (Wuchiapingian)	Hambast Formation	Iran	A member of Nautilida belonging to the superfamily Grypoceratoidea and the family Ocunautilidae. The type species is O. diplodocus; genus also includes O. coelodesmus and O. tachytrephus.	
Orthoteuthis	Gen. et sp. nov		Ikegami et al.	Late Cretaceous (Coniacian)	Yezo Group	Japan	A squid belonging to the group Oegopsida and the family Pachypteroteuthidae. The type species is O. subaru.	
Pachygephyra	Gen. et sp. nov		Ikegami et al.	Late Cretaceous (Santonian)	Yezo Group	Japan	A squid belonging to the group Oegopsida and the family Haboroteuthidae. The type species is P. callisto.	
Pachypteroteuthis	Gen. et 4 sp. nov		Ikegami et al.	Late Cretaceous (Cenomanian to Campanian)	Yezo Group	Japan	A squid belonging to the group Oegopsida, the type genus of the new family Pachypteroteuthidae. The type species is P. adiacens; genus also includes P. mortarii, P. magnus and P. sulcatus.	
Paleothysanoteuthis	Gen. et sp. nov		Ikegami et al.	Late Cretaceous (Santonian)	Yezo Group	Japan	A squid belonging to the group Oegopsida, the type genus of the new family Paleothysanoteuthidae. The type species is P. complicatus.	
Paraliroceras macrogaster	Sp. nov	Valid	Korn & Hairapetian	Permian (Wuchiapingian)	Hambast Formation	Iran	A member of the family Liroceratidae.	
Pellucidoceras	Gen. et comb. nov	Valid	Manda & Turek	Silurian	Kopanina Formation	Czech Republic Sweden United States (New York)	A member of Pseudorthoceratida. The type species is "Orthoceras" decipiens Barrande (1866); genus also includes P. columnare (Marklin in Boll, 1857), P. morrisi (Barrande, 1868), P. trusitum (Clarke & Ruedemann, 1903) and P. visitatum (Barrande, 1866).	
Peripetoceras parum	Sp. nov	Valid	Korn & Ghaderi	Permian (Wuchiapingian)	Julfa Formation	Iran		
Permodomatoceras hamdii	Sp. nov	Valid	Korn & Ghaderi	Permian (Wuchiapingian)	Julfa Formation	Iran	A member of Nautilida belonging to the superfamily Grypoceratoidea and the family Domatoceratidae.	
Permonautilus adelphidus	Sp. nov	Valid	Korn & Hairapetian	Permian (Wuchiapingian)	Hambast Formation	Iran		
Placomoteuthis	Gen. et sp. nov		Ikegami et al.	Late Cretaceous (Maastrichtian)	Yezo Group	Japan	A squid belonging to the group Oegopsida and the family Haboroteuthidae. The type species is P. hercules.	
Pseudovampyroteuthis	Gen. et sp. nov		Ikegami et al.	Late Cretaceous (Cenomanian)	Yezo Group	Japan	A squid belonging to the group Oegopsida and the family Pachypteroteuthidae. The type species is P. hecate.	
Psiloteuthis	Gen. et 4 sp. nov		Ikegami et al.	Late Cretaceous (Cenomanian to Maastrichtian)	Yezo Group	Japan	A squid belonging to family Loliginidae. The type species is P. naucrates; genus also includes P. atalante, P. sculptus and P. transitus.	
Redpathoceras saxbyense	Sp. nov	Valid	Kröger	Ordovician (Katian)	Kõrgessaare Formation	Estonia	A member of Ascocerida belonging to the family Probillingsitidae.	
Richardsonoceras priscum	Comb. nov	Valid	(Eichwald)	Ordovician (Katian)	Kõrgessaare Formation	Estonia	A member of the family Oncoceratidae; moved from "Cyrtoceras" priscum Eichwald (1860).	
Rizosceras teres	Sp. nov	Valid	Kröger	Ordovician (Katian)	Kõrgessaare Formation	Estonia	A member of the family Oncoceratidae.	
Sactorthoceras pustulatum	Sp. nov	Valid	Aubrechtová, Turek & Evans	Ordovician		Czech Republic		
Saxbyoceras	Gen. et sp. nov	Valid	Kröger	Ordovician (Katian)	Kõrgessaare Formation	Estonia	A member of the family Apsidoceratidae. The type species is S. kingpooli.	
Schuchertoceras deformis	Comb. nov	Valid	(Eichwald)	Ordovician (Katian)	Kõrgessaare Formation	Estonia	A member of the family Ascoceratidae; moved from "Ascoceras" deforme Eichwald (1860).	
Scuthoteuthis	Gen. et 4 sp. nov		Ikegami et al.	Late Cretaceous (Cenomanian to Campanian)	Yezo Group	Japan	A squid belonging to the group Oegopsida, the type genus of the new family Scuthoteuthidae. The type species is S. kawataro; genus also includes S. fragilis, S. falcatus and S. tenuis.	
Sepultipons	Gen. et 3 sp. nov		Ikegami et al.	Late Cretaceous (Turonian to Maastrichtian)	Yezo Group	Japan	A squid belonging to the group Oegopsida and the family Pachypteroteuthidae. The type species is S. castor; genus also includes S. pollux and S. gradus.	
Serometacoceras	Gen. et comb. et 5 sp. nov	Valid	Korn & Ghaderi	Permian (Capitanian to Changhsingian)		Armenia; Azerbaijan; China; Iran; Pakistan	A member of Nautilida belonging to the superfamily Pleuronautiloidea and the family Metacoceratidae. The type species is "Pleuronautilus" verae von Arthaber (1900); genus also includes new species S. cingulum Korn & Ghaderi, S. inflatum Korn & Ghaderi, S. parvituberculatum Korn & Ghaderi, S. arasense Korn & Ghaderi and S. pentagonum Korn & Hairapetian, as well as additional nautilid species from Transcaucasia, Iran, Pakistan and China.	
Shahrezanautilus	Gen. et 2 sp. nov	Valid	Korn & Hairapetian	Permian (Wuchiapingian)	Hambast Formation	Iran	A member of Nautilida belonging to the superfamily Liroceratoidea and the family Julfanautilidae. The type species is S. weyeri; genus also includes S. ghaderii.	
Stearoceras milleri	Sp. nov	Valid	Sealey & Lucas	Permian	San Andres Formation	United States (New Mexico)		
Strandoceras kalevipoegi	Sp. nov	Valid	Kröger	Ordovician (Katian)	Kõrgessaare Formation	Estonia	A member of the family Cyrtogomphoceratidae.	
Strandoceras kohilense	Sp. nov	Valid	Kröger	Ordovician (Katian)	Kõrgessaare Formation	Estonia	A member of the family Cyrtogomphoceratidae.	
Strandoceras muhvi	Sp. nov	Valid	Kröger	Ordovician (Katian)	Kõrgessaare Formation	Estonia	A member of the family Cyrtogomphoceratidae.	
Strandoceras sulevipoegi	Sp. nov	Valid	Kröger	Ordovician (Katian)		Estonia	A member of the family Cyrtogomphoceratidae.	
Streptopteryx	Gen. et 2 sp. nov		Ikegami et al.	Late Cretaceous (Cenomanian to Maastrichtian)	Yezo Group	Japan	A squid belonging to family Loliginidae. The type species is S. glabra; genus also includes S. bidentata.	
Striatocycloceras hosholmense	Sp. nov	Valid	Kröger	Ordovician (Katian)	Adila Formation	Estonia	A member of the family Orthoceratidae.	
Tafadnatoceras elfechtense	Sp. nov	Valid	Fang et al.	Ordovician (Katian)	Upper Tiouririne Formation	Morocco	A member of the family Stereoplasmoceratidae.	
Tainionautilus deinceps	Sp. nov	Valid	Korn & Ghaderi	Permian (Changhsingian)	Ali Bashi Formation	Iran		
Tainoceras admonens	Sp. nov	Valid	Korn & Ghaderi	Permian (Wuchiapingian)	Julfa Formation	Iran		
Tainoceras hystatum	Sp. nov	Valid	Korn & Hairapetian	Permian (Changhsingian)	Hambast Formation	Iran		
Tainoceras latecostatum	Sp. nov	Valid	Korn & Ghaderi	Permian (Wuchiapingian)	Julfa Formation	Iran		
Tainoceras unitum	Sp. nov	Valid	Korn & Ghaderi	Permian (Changhsingian)	Ali Bashi Formation	Iran		
Tainoceras vashutinense	Sp. nov	Valid	Monakhov & Leonova	Carboniferous	Moscow Syneclise	Russia		
Tardunautilus	Gen. et 3 sp. nov	Valid	Korn & Ghaderi	Permian (Wuchiapingian)	Ali Bashi Formation	Iran	A member of Nautilida belonging to the superfamily Pleuronautiloidea and the family Foordiceratidae. The type species is T. nimius Korn & Ghaderi; genus also includes T. minor Korn & Ghaderi and T. aperimos Korn & Hairapetian.	
Thalassasboides	Gen. et 3 sp. nov		Ikegami et al.	Late Cretaceous (Cenomanian to Campanian)	Yezo Group	Japan	A squid belonging to the group Oegopsida and the family Pachypteroteuthidae. The type species is T. watatsumi; genus also includes T. pulchellus and T. acutus.	
Trocholites baldri	Sp. nov	Valid	Aubrechtová & Korn	Ordovician		Germany		
Trocholites freyjae	Sp. nov	Valid	Aubrechtová & Korn	Ordovician		Estonia; Germany; Sweden		
Trocholites glacialis	Sp. nov	Valid	Aubrechtová & Korn	Ordovician		Germany; Poland		
Trocholites kadakaensis	Sp. nov	Valid	Aubrechtová & Korn	Ordovician (Darriwilian)	Väo Formation	Estonia		
Trocholites luna	Sp. nov	Valid	Aubrechtová & Korn	Ordovician		Germany		
Trocholites splendor	Sp. nov	Valid	Aubrechtová & Korn	Ordovician		Poland		
Trocholites triangulus	Sp. nov	Valid	Aubrechtová & Korn	Ordovician		Germany		
Trocholites tureki	Sp. nov	Valid	Aubrechtová & Korn	Ordovician		Estonia; Sweden		
Trocholites vodickai	Sp. nov	Valid	Aubrechtová & Korn	Ordovician		Germany; Poland		
Trocholites vortex	Sp. nov	Valid	Aubrechtová & Korn	Ordovician		Germany		
Trocholites zaryensis	Sp. nov	Valid	Aubrechtová & Korn	Ordovician (probably Darriwilian)		Poland		
Wennanoceras remotum	Sp. nov		Song et al.	Ordovician		China		
Wutinoceras multiseptum	Sp. nov		Song et al.	Ordovician		China	A member of Actinocerida belonging to the family Wutinoceratidae.	
Xiaohenautilus chatelaini	Sp. nov	Valid	Jenks et al.	Early Triassic	Dinwoody Formation	United States (Nevada)	A member of the family Grypoceratidae.	

=== Other cephalopod research ===
- A study on the body size evolution of cephalopods with orthoconic conchs, nautilids, ammonoids and neocoleoids is published by Klug et al. (2025).
- Song et al. (2025) identify a new cephalopod assemblage from the Ordovician (Katian) Koumenzi Formation (Qinghai, China).
- Pohle et al. (2025) present a new model for the formation of cameral deposits within shells of orthoceratoids on the basis of the study of specimens of Trematoceras elegans from the San Cassiano Formation (Italy).
- Korn (2025) revises the classification of Carboniferous and Permian members of Nautilida, and names new families Dasbergoceratidae, Epistroboceratidae, Stenopoceratidae, Foordiceratidae, Metacoceratidae and Planetoceratidae.
- Redescription of Phacoceras oxystomum is published by Korn (2025).
- A large nautilid specimen belonging to the genus Cenoceras, preserved with damage interpreted as most likely to be a bite mark produced by a pliosaurid, is described from the Bathonian strata in Poland by Jain et al. (2025).
- Efremenko & Dzyuba (2025) study the composition of Early Cretaceous belemnite assemblages from the Anabar area in eastern Siberia (Russia), reporting evidence of changes of composition of the studied communities resulting from changes in the depth of their basin and migrations of belemnites of European origins.
- Evidence of differences in preservation of soft tissues of specimens of Dorateuthis syriaca from different Cretaceous Lagerstätten from Lebanon is presented by Rowe et al. (2025).

== Bivalves ==
Name	Novelty	Status	Authors	Age	Type locality	Location	Notes	Images
Acesta californica	Sp. nov	Valid	Powell & Rugh	Eocene	Ardath Shale	United States (California)	A species of Acesta.	
Anhapoa	Gen. et sp. nov		Baumann et al.	Early Cretaceous (Berriasian)	Salvador Formation	Brazil	A member of the family Iridinidae. Genus includes new species A. munizi.	
Anomia vakram	Sp. nov		Venu Gopal & Chattopadhyay & Dutta	Oligocene		India	A species of Anomia.	
Aulacomyella ? ludbrookae	Sp. nov	Valid	Day in Jell & Cook			Australia		
Austromyophorella gallowayi	Sp. nov	Valid	Day in Jell & Cook			Australia		
Betanicania	Gen. et comb. nov	Valid	Janssen & Stein	Miocene		Germany	A member of the family Astartidae. The type species is "Astarte" pygmaea Münster (1837).	
Callista ramparensis	Sp. nov		Venu Gopal & Chattopadhyay & Dutta	Miocene		India	A species of Callista.	
Camptonectes aramacensis	Sp. nov	Valid	Day in Jell & Cook			Australia		
Corbicellopsis exoni	Sp. nov	Valid	Day in Jell & Cook			Australia		
Crassatella originalis	Sp. nov	Valid	Berezovsky, Gašparič & Kovalchuk	Oligocene		Ukraine	A species of Crassatella.	
Devonomya	Gen. et sp. nov	Valid	Queiroz et al.	Devonian	Ponta Grossa Formation	Brazil	Genus includes new species D. gondwanica.	
Duplexium	Gen. et sp. nov		Baumann et al.	Early Cretaceous (Berriasian)	Salvador Formation	Brazil	A member of the family Iridinidae. Genus includes new species D. jatobensis.	
Enigmonia silossa	Sp. nov	Valid	Pacaud et al.	Eocene (Bartonian)		France	A species of Enigmonia.	
Ennucula keaseyensis	Sp. nov	Valid	Hickman	Paleogene	Keasey Formation	United States (Oregon)	A species of Ennucula.	
Ezocallista toyamaensis	Sp. nov	Valid	Amano in Amano, Hamuro & Hamuro	Miocene	Kurosedani Formation	Japan	A member of the family Veneridae.	
Fissilunula coreenaensis	Sp. nov	Valid	Day in Jell & Cook			Australia		
Goumardonaia	Gen. et comb. nov		Franklin et al.	Cretaceous		Mali; Morocco	A member of Trigoniida belonging to the family Plicatounionidae. The type species is "Plicatounio" radieri Goumard (1956).	
Kemkemnaia	Gen. et sp. nov		Franklin et al.	Cretaceous	Kem Kem Group (Ifezouane Formation)	Morocco	A member of Trigoniida belonging to the family Desertellidae. The type species is K. parvum.	
Laevicanotia	Gen. et comb. nov	Valid	Day in Jell & Cook			Australia	The type species is "Gari" elliptica Whitehouse (1925).	
Leionucula doncasterensis	Sp. nov	Valid	Day in Jell & Cook			Australia		
Ledella favus	Sp. nov	Valid	Hoffman & Little in Little et al.	Pleistocene	Krishna-Godavari Basin	Bay of Bengal, offshore eastern India	A member of the family Nuculanidae.	
Lopatinia prima	Sp. nov	Valid	Kosenko et al.	Late Jurassic (Oxfordian–Kimmeridgian)		Russia	A member of the family Cucullaeidae.	
Maccoyella allaruensis	Sp. nov	Valid	Day in Jell & Cook			Australia		
Maccoyella muttaburraensis	Sp. nov	Valid	Day in Jell & Cook			Australia		
Malletia soledadensis	Sp. nov	Valid	Powell & Rugh	Eocene	Ardath Shale	United States (California)	A member of the family Malletiidae.	
Mazaevella	Gen. et comb. nov	Valid	Shilekhin, Biakov & Vdovichenko	Carboniferous-Permian (Gzhelian-Sakmarian)		Russia	A member of Pectinida belonging to the family Annuliconchidae. The type species is "Annuliconcha" placunensis Nelzina (1958). Published online in 2026, but the issue date is listed as December 2025.	
Meleagrinella merivalensis	Sp. nov	Valid	Day in Jell & Cook			Australia		
Monopteria heaneyi	Sp. nov	Valid	Yancey	Carboniferous (Gzhelian)	Holder Formation	United States (New Mexico)	A member of Myalinida belonging to the family Monopteriidae.	
Monopteria magna	Sp. nov	Valid	Yancey	Carboniferous (Gzhelian)	Graham Formation	United States (Texas)	A member of Myalinida belonging to the family Monopteriidae.	
Mytilopsis parodizi	Sp. nov	Valid	Pérez, Griffin & Manceñido	Miocene	Paraná Formation	Argentina	A species of Mytilopsis.	
Neovenericor camachoi	Sp. nov		Pérez, Cuitiño & Soto	Miocene	Gaiman Formation	Argentina	A member of the family Carditidae.	
Nucula cascadensis	Sp. nov	Valid	Hickman	Paleogene	Keasey Formation	United States (Oregon)	A species of Nucula.	
Palaeomoera milligani	Sp. nov	Valid	Day in Jell & Cook			Australia		
Peredmondia	Gen. et comb. nov	Valid	Hodges	Triassic		Italy	The type species is "Anomia" favrii Stoppani (1863).	
Pholadomya arguta	Sp. nov	Valid	Berezovsky, Gašparič & Kovalchuk	Oligocene		Ukraine	A species of Pholadomya.	
Potomida schneideri	Sp. nov	Valid	Mandic in Neubauer, Mandic & Sebe	Miocene	Szászvár Formation	Hungary	A species of Potomida.	
Pristigloma mistensis	Sp. nov	Valid	Hickman	Paleogene	Keasey Formation	United States (Oregon)	A member of the family Pristiglomidae.	
Pseudonicania	Gen. et comb. nov	Valid	Janssen & Stein	Miocene		Germany	A member of the family Astartidae. The type species is "Astarte" gracilis Münster (1837).	
Pycnodonte (Phygraea) matsubarai	Sp. nov	Valid	Amano in Amano, Hamuro & Hamuro	Miocene	Kurosedani Formation	Japan	A member of the family Gryphaeidae.	
Rhynchostreon cauveryensis	Sp. nov	Valid	Chattopadhyay et al.	Late Cretaceous (Maastrichtian)	Kallnakurichchi Formation	India	A member of the family Gryphaeidae.	
Sarepta nascif	Sp. nov	Valid	Hickman	Paleogene	Keasey Formation	United States (Oregon)	A member of the family Sareptidae.	
Sarepta oregonensis	Sp. nov	Valid	Hickman	Paleogene	Keasey Formation	United States (Oregon)	A member of the family Sareptidae.	
Streblochondria dalianensis	Sp. nov		Han et al.		Taiyuan Formation	China	A member of Pectinida belonging to the family Streblochondriidae.	
Streblopermia	Gen. et sp. nov	Valid	Biakov	Permian (Changhsingian)		Russia	A pectinoid bivalve. Genus includes new species S. minima.	
Thracia acris	Sp. nov	Valid	Berezovsky, Gašparič & Kovalchuk	Oligocene		Ukraine	A species of Thracia.	
Trigonipraxis boeckhi	Comb. nov	Valid	(Wenz)	Miocene		Hungary	A member of the family Dreissenidae; moved from "Congeria" boeckhi Wenz (1931)	
Tucetona bharati	Sp. nov		Venu Gopal & Chattopadhyay & Dutta	Oligocene		India	A species of Tucetona.	
Tucetona tsudai	Sp. nov	Valid	Amano in Amano, Hamuro & Hamuro	Miocene	Kurosedani Formation	Japan	A species of Tucetona.	
Unio radleyi	Sp. nov		Franklin et al.	Cretaceous	Kem Kem Group (Ifezouane Formation)	Morocco	A species of Unio.	
Vesicomya prashadi	Sp. nov	Valid	Hoffman & Little in Little et al.	Pleistocene	Krishna-Godavari Basin	Bay of Bengal, offshore eastern India	A member of the family Vesicomyidae.	
Willipteria	Gen. et sp. et comb. nov	Valid	Yancey	Carboniferous (Gzhelian) and Permian	Graham Formation	United States (Texas)	Possibly a member of the family Pterineidae. The type species is W. nestelli; genus also includes "Leptodesma" falcata Boyd & Newell (2001).	
Yoldia lehmanni	Nom. nov	Valid	Janssen & Stein	Miocene		Germany	A species of Yoldia; a replacement name for Leda subrostrata Lehmann (1885).	
Yoldiella pampauensis	Sp. nov	Valid	Janssen & Stein	Miocene		Germany		
Yoldiella twistringensis	Sp. nov	Valid	Janssen & Stein	Miocene		Germany		
Yoldiella umbostriata	Sp. nov	Valid	Hoffman & Little in Little et al.	Pleistocene	Krishna-Godavari Basin	Bay of Bengal, offshore eastern India	A member of the family Yoldiidae.	
Zaletrigonia mackundaensis	Sp. nov	Valid	Day in Jell & Cook			Australia		

=== Bivalve research ===
- Gavirneni, Ivany & Reddin (2025) calculate resting metabolic rates for fossil bivalves, and find bivalves with higher mass-specific metabolic rates to be overall more vulnerable to extinction throughout the evolutionary history of the group.
- Revision of Ordovician bivalves from the Montagne Noire (France) is published by Polechová (2025).
- Shi et al. (2025) report the first discovery of silicified bivalve fossils from the Permian (Kungurian−Roadian) strata of the Wandrawandian Siltstone (Australia), and reconstruct the taphonomic history of these fossils.
- Yang et al. (2025) report the first discovery of alatoconchid fossil material from the middle Permian strata of the Maokou Formation (Hubei, China).
- Zhao et al. (2025) study the chronological framework of accumulation of alatoconchid fossils from the Permian Maokou Formation (China), and constrain the extinction of alatoconchids to approximately 262.8 million years ago.
- Miao et al. (2025) study the fossil record of Triassic marine bivalves, and report evidence of recovery of taxonomic richness after the Permian–Triassic extinction event during the Early Triassic, and of recovery of ecological diversity in the Middle Triassic.
- A study on Early Triassic bivalve communities from the Liuzhi and Bozhou sections in Guizhou (China), providing evidence of increase of species diversity in associations dominated by members of the genus Claraia, but also evidence of broad ecological uniformity in the aftermath of the Permian–Triassic extinction event, is published by Yang et al. (2025).
- Hautmann (2025) interprets Triassic bivalve Pseudocorbula as a basal member of the superfamily Arcticoidea within the group Venerida, and names a new subfamily Pseudocorbulinae within the family Isocyprinidae.
- Evidence from the study of unionoid bivalve specimens from the Triassic of Poland and from the Cretaceous of Brazil and the United Kingdom, indicative of evolution of advanced anatomical traits of gills after the Triassic, is presented by Skawina & Ghilardi (2025).
- Evidence indicating that pattern of changes of diversity of pectinoid bivalves from the Caucasus throughout the Jurassic period differed from the global pattern is presented by Ruban (2025).
- Isaji (2025) redescribes "Unio" ogamigoensis and "Archaeounio" kagaensis, transfers the former species to the genus Margaritifera and the latter one to the genus Nakamuranaia, and determines the habitat preferences of the two species, interpreting M. ogamigoensis as living in rapidly flowing streams and N. kagaensis as living in shallow lakes on floodplains.
- Neubauer et al. (2025) identify the pectinid genus Velata Quenstedt (1857) as validly named and a senior synonym of Eopecten, and identify the type species of the genus Velata, "Spondylus" tuberculosus Goldfuss (1835), as a junior synonym of Velata abjecta (Phillips, 1829).
- A study on the shell microstructure, ecology and biostratigraphic utility of Liostrea birmanica, based on fossil from the Middle Jurassic Daoban Formation (China), is published by Li et al. (2025).
- Simões et al. (2025) describe a new mollusc-dominated assemblage from the uppermost Romualdo Formation (Brazil), including freshwater bivalves previously known only from the underlying Crato Formation.
- Silva et al. (2025) describe new fossil material of bivalves from Lower Cretaceous deposits in northeastern Brazil, expanding known range of the genera Araripenaia, Cratonaia and Monginellopsis beyond the Crato and Romualdo formations.
- Skelton & Gili (2025) interpret the fossil evidence as indicating that congregations of rudist bivalves had more in common in oyster reefs or colonizations of carbonate banks by members of the genus Pinna than with tropical coral reefs.
- Rineau et al. (2025) report the first discovery of fossils of members of the rudist genus Sellaea from the Albian strata of the Basque-Cantabrian Basin (Spain).
- Mougola et al. (2025) report on the composition of the bivalve assemblage from the Upper Cretaceous (Coniacian–Santonian) strata from Cap Estérias, including first records of three bivalve genera and twelve species from the Gabon Coastal Basin described to date.
- Evidence of changes of composition of Late Cretaceous bivalve communities from the Ariyalur Sub-basin (India), interpreted as likely related to changing substrate conditions, is presented by Mukhopadhyay et al. (2025).
- Lucas et al. (2025) report evidence of preservation of shell color patterns in two specimens of Cataceramus glendivensis from the Maastrichtian Pierre Shale (New Mexico, United States).
- Evidence from the study of the fossil record of marine bivalves, indicating that the Cretaceous–Paleogene extinction event resulted in disruption of biodiversity of marine bivalves but did not fully determine their present-day diversity, is presented by Edie, Collins & Jablonski (2025).
- Villegas-Martín et al. (2025) identify a fossil wood specimens from the La Meseta Formation (Antarctica), preserved with a boring interpreted as likely produced by a large-bodied member of the genus Kuphus, and representing possible evidence of wood colonization by large-bodied shipworms in the Antarctic Peninsula during the Eocene.
- Bojarski, Cierocka & Szwedo (2025) report the discovery of more than 90 inclusions of piddocks in the Miocene Mexican amber, representing various developmental stages and at least five distinct morphotypes.
- Slattery et al. (2025) study the impact of different climate regimes on the evolution of members of the genus Nucula from the Late Cretaceous to the Quaternary, and find evidence that morphological change of the studied bivalves coincided with more stable climate conditions.

== Gastropods ==
Name	Novelty	Status	Authors	Age	Type locality	Location	Notes	Images
Acirsa fusiformis	Sp. nov	Valid	Harzhauser & Landau	Miocene	Dej Formation	Austria; Romania	A species of Acirsa.	
Acirsa koskeridouae	Sp. nov	Valid	Harzhauser & Landau	Miocene	Baden Formation	Austria	A species of Acirsa.	
Acmaea claibornica	Sp. nov	Valid	Garvie	Eocene		United States (Texas)	A species of Acmaea.	
Acrilloscala austriaca	Sp. nov	Valid	Harzhauser & Landau	Miocene	Baden Formation	Austria	A wentletrap belonging to the subfamily Epitoniinae.	
Acrilloscala fortior	Sp. nov	Valid	Harzhauser & Landau	Miocene	Grund Formation	Austria	A wentletrap belonging to the subfamily Epitoniinae.	
Acrilloscala propugnaculum	Sp. nov	Valid	Harzhauser & Landau	Miocene	Grund Formation	Austria; Hungary; Poland; Romania	A wentletrap belonging to the subfamily Epitoniinae.	
Acrocoelum richardsi	Sp. nov	Valid	Govoni in Govoni et al.	Paleocene	Brightseat Formation	United States (Maryland)		
Acteon danicus	Sp. nov	Valid	Govoni in Govoni et al.	Paleocene	Brightseat Formation	United States (Maryland)	A species of Acteon.	
Adeuomphalus intermedius	Sp. nov	Valid	Lozouet	Oligocene		France	A species of Adeuomphalus.	
Adiscoacrilla anticoppii	Sp. nov	Valid	Harzhauser & Landau	Miocene	Grund Formation	Austria	A wentletrap belonging to the subfamily Epitoniinae.	
Adiscoacrilla walaszczyki	Sp. nov	Valid	Harzhauser & Landau	Miocene	Baden Formation	Austria; Poland	A wentletrap belonging to the subfamily Epitoniinae.	
Admete trigostomoides	Sp. nov	Valid	Bouchard et al.	Pleistocene (Gelasian)		France	A species of Admete.	
Alaba laevae	Sp. nov	Valid	Garvie	Eocene		United States (Alabama)	A species of Alaba.	
Alvania acutissimispira	Sp. nov	Valid	Landau, Amati & Harzhauser	Pliocene		Spain	A species of Alvania.	
Alvania axistriata	Sp. nov	Valid	Hoffman & Little in Little et al.	Pleistocene	Krishna-Godavari Basin	Bay of Bengal, offshore eastern India	A species of Alvania.	
Alvania baluki	Nom. nov	Valid	Kovács & Stein	Miocene		Poland	A species of Alvania; a replacement name for Alvania tenuicostata Bałuk (1975).	
Alvania bicingulina	Sp. nov	Valid	Landau, Amati & Harzhauser	Pliocene		Spain	A species of Alvania.	
Alvania cimicoiberica	Sp. nov	Valid	Landau, Amati & Harzhauser	Pliocene		Spain	A species of Alvania.	
Alvania hispanica	Sp. nov	Valid	Landau, Amati & Harzhauser	Pliocene		Spain	A species of Alvania.	
Alvania iberopliocenica	Sp. nov	Valid	Landau, Amati & Harzhauser	Pliocene		Spain	A species of Alvania.	
Alvania lachrymiformis	Sp. nov	Valid	Landau, Amati & Harzhauser	Pliocene		Spain	A species of Alvania.	
Alvania lobilloensis	Sp. nov	Valid	Landau, Amati & Harzhauser	Pliocene		Spain	A species of Alvania.	
Alvania nemethi	Sp. nov	Valid	Kovács & Stein	Miocene	Lajta Limestone Formation	Hungary	A species of Alvania.	
Alvania ohleorum	Sp. nov	Valid	Janssen & Stein	Miocene		Germany	A species of Alvania.	
Alvania selsoifensis	Sp. nov	Valid	Bouchard et al.	Pleistocene (Gelasian)		France	A species of Alvania.	
Alvania vandervalki	Sp. nov	Valid	Landau, Amati & Harzhauser	Pliocene		Spain	A species of Alvania.	
Alvania veleriniana	Sp. nov	Valid	Landau, Amati & Harzhauser	Pliocene		Spain	A species of Alvania.	
Alvania viciani	Sp. nov	Valid	Kovács & Stein	Miocene	Lajta Limestone Formation	Hungary	A species of Alvania.	
Amaea grunerti	Sp. nov	Valid	Harzhauser & Landau	Miocene	Ottnang Formation	Austria; Hungary	A species of Amaea.	
Amalda gobanus	Sp. nov	Valid	Vrinat	Eocene		France	A species of Amalda.	
Ampezzopleura brauneckensis	Sp. nov	Valid	Nützel, Nose & Hautmann	Late Triassic (Rhaetian)	Kössen Formation	Germany	A member of the family Zygopleuridae.	
Amphissa alabamensis	Sp. nov	Valid	Garvie	Eocene	Gosport Sand	United States (Alabama)	A species of Amphissa.	
Anatoma sahlingi	Sp. nov	Valid	Hoffman & Little in Little et al.	Pleistocene	Krishna-Godavari Basin	Bay of Bengal, offshore eastern India	A species of Anatoma.	
Anbullina minor	Sp. nov	Valid	Garvie	Eocene		United States (Texas)	A member of the family Ancillariidae.	
Ancillus wechesensis	Sp. nov	Valid	Garvie	Eocene	Cane River Formation	United States (Texas)	A member of the family Ancillariidae.	
Anguloacrilla	Gen. et comb. et 3 sp. nov	Valid	Harzhauser & Landau	Miocene		Austria; Bulgaria; Czech Republic; Hungary; Romania; Turkey; France?	A wentletrap belonging to the subfamily Epitoniinae. The type species is "Scalaria (Acrilla)" kimakowiczi Boettger (1896), genus also includes new species A. schwarzhansi, A. karamanensis and A. lima.	
Anteberthais	Gen. et sp. nov	Valid	Lozouet	Eocene		France	A member of the family Vanikoridae. The type species is A. incerta.	
Anticlimax gardnerae	Sp. nov	Valid	Govoni in Govoni et al.	Paleocene	Brightseat Formation	United States (Maryland)	A species of Anticlimax.	
Anticlimax traceyi	Sp. nov	Valid	Garvie	Eocene		United States (Texas)	A species of Anticlimax.	
Aporrhais schiecki	Sp. nov	Valid	Janssen & Stein	Miocene		Germany	A species of Aporrhais.	
Aptyxiella bajocensis	Sp. nov		Saha et al.	Jurassic		India		
Architectonica (Granosolarium) umbilicrassa	Sp. nov	Valid	Garvie	Eocene	Cook Mountain Formation	United States (Texas)	A member of the family Architectonicidae.	
Aspella teter	Sp. nov	Valid	Harzhauser, Landau & Merle	Miocene	Baden Formation	Austria; Hungary; Poland	A species of Aspella.	
Asymmetrorbis	Gen. et sp. nov	Valid	Neubauer in Neubauer, Mandic & Sebe	Miocene	Kiskunhalas Formation	Hungary	A member of the family Planorbidae. The type species is A. pseudovitrina.	
Ataphrus (Endianaulax) dhosaensis	Sp. nov		Saha et al.	Jurassic		India		
Athleta acutinodula	Sp. nov	Valid	Belliard & Gain	Eocene		France	A species of Athleta.	
Athleta fournigaulti	Sp. nov	Valid	Belliard & Gain	Eocene		France	A species of Athleta.	
Atys tumidus	Sp. nov	Valid	Garvie	Eocene	Cook Mountain Formation	United States (Texas)	A species of Atys.	
Austrocarina nitidus	Sp. nov	Valid	Garvie	Eocene	Cook Mountain Formation	United States (Texas)	A species of Austrocarina.	
Austroharpa pasi	Sp. nov	Valid	Hawke & Guyonneau	Pliocene to Pleistocene		Australia	A species of Austroharpa.	
Awateria meta	Sp. nov	Valid	Garvie	Eocene	Weches Formation	United States (Texas)	A species of Awateria.	
Aylacostoma pachyspirum	Sp. nov		Simone & Ramos	Neogene	Solimões Formation	Brazil	A species of Aylacostoma.	
Bayania elegans	Sp. nov	Valid	Garvie	Eocene		United States (Alabama)		
Bayania funicula	Sp. nov	Valid	Garvie	Eocene		United States (Alabama)		
Bellardithala borzsonyensis	Sp. nov	Valid	Biskupič & Kovács	Miocene	Lajta Limestone Formation	Hungary	A member of the family Costellariidae.	
Bellardithala fenestrata	Sp. nov	Valid	Biskupič	Miocene (Serravallian)	Sandberg Formation	Slovakia	A member of the family Costellariidae.	
Bistolida agriotheria	Sp. nov	Valid	Lorenz	Neogene		Indonesia	A species of Bistolida.	
Bistolida archistolida	Sp. nov	Valid	Lorenz	Neogene		Indonesia	A species of Bistolida.	
Bistolida gilbertlii	Sp. nov	Valid	Lorenz	Neogene		Indonesia	A species of Bistolida.	
Bistolida marcoi	Sp. nov	Valid	Lorenz	Neogene		Indonesia	A species of Bistolida.	
Bistolida nodulosa	Sp. nov	Valid	Lorenz	Neogene		Indonesia	A species of Bistolida.	
Bittium amibouei	Sp. nov	Valid	Harzhauser, Guzhov & Landau	Miocene	Baden Formation	Austria; Slovakia	A species of Bittium.	
Bittium badzoshviliae	Sp. nov	Valid	Harzhauser, Guzhov & Landau	Miocene		Abkhazia; Azerbaijan; Georgia; Russia (Chechnya; Krasnodar Krai; Rostov Oblast)	A species of Bittium.	
Bittium foedum	Sp. nov	Valid	Harzhauser, Guzhov & Landau	Miocene	Fels Formation	Austria	A species of Bittium.	
Bittium grinzingense	Sp. nov	Valid	Harzhauser, Guzhov & Landau	Miocene	Baden Formation	Austria; Czech Republic; Hungary; Romania; Slovakia	A species of Bittium.	
Bittium krenni	Sp. nov	Valid	Harzhauser, Guzhov & Landau	Miocene	Dej Formation	Czech Republic; Hungary; Romania; Slovakia; Ukraine	A species of Bittium.	
Bittium merklini	Sp. nov	Valid	Harzhauser, Guzhov & Landau	Miocene		Ukraine	A species of Bittium.	
Bittium nabokovorum	Nom. nov	Valid	Guzhov in Harzhauser, Guzhov & Landau	Miocene		Crimea; Russia (Adygea; Krasnodar Krai); Turkey	A species of Bittium; a replacement name for Bittium binodulosum Guzhov.	
Bittium praescabrum	Sp. nov	Valid	Harzhauser, Guzhov & Landau	Miocene	Baden Formation	Austria	A species of Bittium.	
Bittium rossicum	Sp. nov	Valid	Harzhauser, Guzhov & Landau	Miocene		Georgia; Kazakhstan; Russia (Adygea; Karachay-Cherkessia; Krasnodar Krai; Stavropol Krai); Turkey; Ukraine	A species of Bittium.	
Bittium tani	Sp. nov	Valid	Harzhauser, Guzhov & Landau	Miocene	Baden Formation	Austria; Bosnia and Herzegovina; Hungary; Poland; Romania; Slovakia; Ukraine	A species of Bittium.	
Bittium walaszczyki	Sp. nov	Valid	Harzhauser, Guzhov & Landau	Miocene	Korytnica Basin	Poland; Romania	A species of Bittium.	
Blasicrura inornata	Sp. nov	Valid	Lorenz	Neogene		Indonesia	A species of Blasicrura.	
Buckmanina bhakriensis	Sp. nov		Saha et al.	Jurassic		India		
Calliostoma normanensis	Sp. nov	Valid	Bouchard et al.	Pleistocene (Gelasian)		France	A species of Calliostoma.	
Calyptraea aldrichi	Sp. nov	Valid	Govoni in Govoni et al.	Paleocene	Brightseat Formation	United States (Maryland)	A species of Calyptraea.	
Canariella canteriaensis	Sp. nov	Valid	Groh, Hutterer & Neiber	Pliocene		Spain (Canary Islands)	A species of Canariella.	
Canariella gosteliae	Sp. nov	Valid	Groh, Hutterer & Neiber	Pliocene		Spain (Canary Islands)	A species of Canariella.	
Canariella guidoi	Sp. nov	Valid	Groh, Hutterer & Neiber	Pliocene		Spain (Canary Islands)	A species of Canariella.	
Canariella jansseni	Sp. nov	Valid	Groh, Hutterer & Neiber	Pliocene		Spain (Canary Islands)	A species of Canariella.	
Canariella vegaviejaensis	Sp. nov	Valid	Groh, Hutterer & Neiber	Pliocene		Spain (Canary Islands)	A species of Canariella.	
Cancellicula hoepfneri	Sp. nov	Valid	Janssen & Stein	Miocene		Germany	A species of Cancellicula.	
Cantharus houstonensis	Sp. nov	Valid	Garvie	Eocene		United States (Texas)	A species of Cantharus.	
Cantharus uitta	Sp. nov	Valid	Garvie	Eocene		United States (Texas)	A species of Cantharus.	
Capulus coqueremons	Sp. nov	Valid	Garvie	Eocene		United States (Texas)	A species of Capulus.	
Careliopsis malchowi	Sp. nov	Valid	Janssen & Stein	Miocene		Germany	A species of Careliopsis.	
Cathymorula exilissima	Sp. nov	Valid	Harzhauser, Landau & Merle	Miocene	Grund Formation	Austria; Poland	A member of the family Muricidae.	
Caveola elongata	Sp. nov	Valid	Garvie	Eocene	Cook Mountain Formation	United States (Texas)	A member of Tonnoidea belonging to the family Mataxidae.	
Ceratostoma? steiningeri	Sp. nov	Valid	Harzhauser, Landau & Merle	Miocene	Gauderndorf Formation	Austria	Possibly a species of Ceratostoma.	
Cerithidium iljinae	Sp. nov	Valid	Harzhauser, Guzhov & Landau	Miocene		Russia (Krasnodar Krai)	A species of Cerithidium.	
Chilonopsis lanceoloideus	Sp. nov	Valid	Gerlach et al.	Holocene		Saint Helena	A species of Chilonopsis.	
Cirsonella aperta	Sp. nov	Valid	Hoffman & Little in Little et al.	Pleistocene	Krishna-Godavari Basin	Bay of Bengal, offshore eastern India	A species of Cirsonella.	
Cirsotrema microperforata	Sp. nov	Valid	Harzhauser & Landau	Miocene	Baden Formation	Austria	A species of Cirsotrema.	
Cirsotrema nudum	Sp. nov	Valid	Harzhauser & Landau	Miocene	Grund Formation	Austria	A species of Cirsotrema.	
Cirsotrema pollerspoecki	Sp. nov	Valid	Harzhauser & Landau	Miocene		Austria; Germany	A species of Cirsotrema.	
Cirsotrema schneideri	Sp. nov	Valid	Harzhauser & Landau	Miocene	Ottnang Formation	Austria	A species of Cirsotrema.	
Clanculus nigellensis	Sp. nov	Valid	Gain & Belliard	Eocene		France	A species of Clanculus.	
Clypidina fragilis	Sp. nov	Valid	Garvie	Eocene		United States (Texas)	A species of Clypidina.	
Coanollonia eocaenica	Sp. nov	Valid	Garvie	Eocene		United States (Texas)		
Cochlespira nuda	Sp. nov	Valid	Garvie	Eocene		United States (Texas)	A species of Cochlespira.	
Cochliolepis problematica	Sp. nov	Valid	Garvie	Eocene		United States (Texas)	A species of Cochliolepis.	
Cochlis cuniculata	Sp. nov	Valid	Harzhauser, Landau & Guzhov	Miocene	Lajta Formation	Hungary	A species of Cochlis.	
Cochlis degregorioi	Sp. nov	Valid	Harzhauser, Landau & Guzhov	Miocene	Grund Formation	Austria	A species of Cochlis.	
Cochlis gebhardti	Sp. nov	Valid	Harzhauser, Landau & Guzhov	Miocene	Loibersdorf Formation	Austria	A species of Cochlis.	
Cochlis micromillepunctata	Sp. nov	Valid	Harzhauser, Landau & Guzhov	Miocene	Baden Formation	Austria; Bosnia and Herzegovina; Bulgaria; Croatia; Czech Republic; Hungary; Poland; Romania	A species of Cochlis.	
Cochlis neoobscura	Sp. nov	Valid	Harzhauser, Landau & Guzhov	Miocene	Baden Formation	Austria	A species of Cochlis.	
Cochlis paragigantica	Sp. nov	Valid	Harzhauser, Landau & Guzhov	Miocene	Grund Formation	Austria	A species of Cochlis.	
Cochlis pseudoprotracta	Sp. nov	Valid	Harzhauser, Landau & Guzhov	Miocene	Baden Formation	Austria; Bulgaria; Hungary; Poland; Slovenia	A species of Cochlis.	
Cochlis velerinensis	Sp. nov	Valid	Landau & Harzhauser	Pliocene		Spain	A species of Cochlis.	
Cochlis zachosi	Sp. nov	Valid	Harzhauser, Landau & Guzhov	Miocene	Grund Formation	Austria	A species of Cochlis.	
Clathrus corrugatus	Sp. nov	Valid	Harzhauser & Landau	Miocene	Korneuburg Formation	Austria	A wentletrap belonging to the subfamily Epitoniinae.	
Coffeacypraea	Gen. et comb. nov	Valid	Nützel & Schneider in Nützel et al.	Late Jurassic (Tithonian)	Crisanti Formation	Italy; Czech Republic?	A member of the family Cypraeidae. The type species is "Cypraea" tithonica Di Stefano (1882); genus also includes "Cypraea" gemmellaroi Di Stefano (1882).	
Conasprella dingdenensis	Sp. nov	Valid	Roosen & Langeveld	Miocene		Germany	A species of Conasprella.	
Conomodulus altispira	Sp. nov	Valid	Landau & Breitenberger	Miocene (Langhian)		Indonesia	A species of Conomodulus.	
Conomodulus forticostatus	Sp. nov	Valid	Landau & Breitenberger	Miocene (Langhian)		Indonesia	A species of Conomodulus.	
Conradconfusus claibornensis	Sp. nov	Valid	Garvie	Eocene	Gosport Sand	United States (Alabama)	A member of the family Fasciolariidae.	
Contradusta contraviola	Sp. nov	Valid	Lorenz	Neogene		Indonesia	A species of Contradusta.	
Contradusta neocincta	Sp. nov	Valid	Lorenz	Neogene		Indonesia	A species of Contradusta.	
Contradusta pouweri	Sp. nov	Valid	Lorenz	Neogene		Indonesia	A species of Contradusta.	
Contradusta quasiviola	Sp. nov	Valid	Lorenz	Neogene		Indonesia	A species of Contradusta.	
Coptostoma nacogdochensis	Sp. nov	Valid	Garvie	Eocene	Cane River Formation	United States (Texas)	A member of the family Cancellariidae.	
Coralliophila acuta	Sp. nov	Valid	Harzhauser, Landau & Merle	Miocene	Dej Formation	Hungary; Romania	A species of Coralliophila.	
Coralliophila badensis	Sp. nov	Valid	Harzhauser, Landau & Merle	Miocene	Baden Formation	Austria; Romania	A species of Coralliophila.	
Coralliophila elegantula	Sp. nov	Valid	Harzhauser, Landau & Merle	Miocene	Dej Formation	Romania	A species of Coralliophila.	
Coralliophila hoplites	Sp. nov	Valid	Harzhauser, Landau & Merle	Miocene	Baden Formation	Czech Republic	A species of Coralliophila.	
Coralliophila megaglobosa	Sp. nov	Valid	Harzhauser, Landau & Merle	Miocene	Dej Formation	Romania	A species of Coralliophila.	
Coralliophila wegmuelleri	Sp. nov	Valid	Harzhauser, Landau & Merle	Miocene		Switzerland	A species of Coralliophila.	
Cordieria crassisculpta	Sp. nov	Valid	Garvie	Eocene	Cook Mountain Formation	United States (Texas)	A species of Cordieria.	
Coroniopsis gramensis	Sp. nov	Valid	Janssen & Stein	Miocene		Germany		
Coroniopsis langenfeldiana	Sp. nov	Valid	Janssen & Stein	Miocene		Germany		
Cosediella	Gen. et comb. nov	Valid	Pacaud & Hugo	Eocene (Lutetian)		France; United Kingdom	A member of the family Colloniidae. The type species is C. phorculoides (Cossmann & Pissarro, 1902).	
Crassimurex (Eopaziella) zoltani	Sp. nov	Valid	Harzhauser, Landau & Merle	Miocene	Dej Formation	Romania	A species of Crassimurex.	
Creonella obscuriplica	Sp. nov	Valid	Govoni in Govoni et al.	Paleocene	Brightseat Formation	United States (Maryland)		
Cryptocypraea mirabilis	Sp. nov	Valid	Lorenz	Neogene		Indonesia	A member of the family Cypraeidae.	
Cryptospira elenae	Sp. nov	Valid	Celzard	Eocene (Bartonian)		Italy	A species of Cryptospira.	
Cyclostremiscus sohli	Sp. nov	Valid	Govoni in Govoni et al.	Paleocene	Brightseat Formation	United States (Maryland)	A species of Cyclostremiscus.	
Cyclozyga diversarevolvi	Sp. nov	Valid	Anderson, Shares & Boardman	Carboniferous	Wayland Shale	United States (Texas)	A member of the family Pseudozygopleuridae.	
Cyclozyga promohumera	Sp. nov	Valid	Anderson, Shares & Boardman	Carboniferous	Finis Shale	United States (Texas)	A member of the family Pseudozygopleuridae.	
Cylindriscala bellissima	Sp. nov	Valid	Harzhauser & Landau	Miocene	Baden Formation	Austria	A species of Cylindriscala.	
Cylindriscala rugata	Sp. nov	Valid	Harzhauser & Landau	Miocene	Baden Formation	Czech Republic	A species of Cylindriscala.	
Cymbiola puspae	Sp. nov	Valid	Dharma in Dharma & Lorenz	Miocene		Indonesia	A species of Cymbiola.	
Daphnellopsis bouilloni	Sp. nov	Valid	Gain, Belliard & Le Renard	Eocene		France	A species of Daphnellopsis.	
Daphnellopsis traceyi	Sp. nov	Valid	Gain, Belliard & Le Renard	Eocene		France	A species of Daphnellopsis.	
Dikoleps? magnarota	Sp. nov	Valid	Hoffman & Little in Little et al.	Pleistocene	Krishna-Godavari Basin	Bay of Bengal, offshore eastern India	Possibly a species of Dikoleps.	
Dirocerithium parvabrazensis	Sp. nov	Valid	Garvie	Eocene		United States (Texas)		
Discohelix ravii	Sp. nov		Saha et al.	Late Jurassic (Oxfordian)		India		
Dorsanum elongatum	Sp. nov	Valid	Garvie	Eocene	Cook Mountain Formation	United States (Texas)	A species of Dorsanum.	
Dyris amazonensis	Sp. nov		Guimarães et al.	Miocene	Solimões Formation	Brazil		
Eclogavena clava	Sp. nov	Valid	Lorenz	Neogene		Indonesia	A species of Eclogavena.	
Eclogavena melanospira	Sp. nov	Valid	Lorenz	Neogene		Indonesia	A species of Eclogavena.	
Elimia texana	Sp. nov	Valid	Garvie	Eocene		United States (Texas)	A species of Elimia.	
Eoclathurella coqueremons	Sp. nov	Valid	Garvie	Eocene	Cook Mountain Formation	United States (Texas)	A member of Conoidea of uncertain affinities.	
Eoclathurella elegantissima	Sp. nov	Valid	Garvie	Eocene	Cane River Formation	United States (Texas)	A member of Conoidea of uncertain affinities.	
Eoclathurella tenuis	Sp. nov	Valid	Garvie	Eocene	Cook Mountain Formation	United States (Texas)	A member of Conoidea of uncertain affinities.	
Eocymia	Gen. et sp. nov	Valid	Garvie	Eocene		United States (Alabama)	A member of the family Muricidae. The type species is E. claibornica.	
Eocypraea cantellii	Sp. nov	Valid	Celzard & Alberti	Eocene		Italy		
Eocypraea discrepans	Sp. nov	Valid	Pacaud, Loubry & Cazes	Eocene		France		
Eocypraea inadspecta	Sp. nov	Valid	Pacaud, Loubry & Cazes	Eocene		France		
Eocypraea insignis	Sp. nov	Valid	Pacaud, Loubry & Cazes	Eocene		France		
Eocypraea praetermissa	Sp. nov	Valid	Pacaud, Loubry & Cazes	Eocene		France		
Eocypraea teres	Sp. nov	Valid	Pacaud, Loubry & Cazes	Eocene		France		
Eodaphne brazosensis	Sp. nov	Valid	Garvie	Eocene	Cook Mountain Formation	United States (Texas)	A member of Conoidea of uncertain affinities.	
Eotrivia paucivincta	Sp. nov	Valid	Celzard & Alberti	Eocene		Italy		
Erronea caricana	Sp. nov	Valid	Lorenz	Neogene		Indonesia	A species of Erronea.	
Erronea erdmanni	Sp. nov	Valid	Lorenz	Neogene		Indonesia	A species of Erronea.	
Erronea pidana	Sp. nov	Valid	Lorenz	Neogene		Indonesia	A species of Erronea.	
Erronea quasionyx	Sp. nov	Valid	Lorenz	Neogene		Indonesia	A species of Erronea.	
Eucyclus jadsaensis	Sp. nov		Saha et al.	Jurassic		India		
Eucypraedia hawkei	Sp. nov	Valid	Celzard	Miocene	Cadell Marl	Australia		
Eucypraedia monsmaladensis	Sp. nov	Valid	Checchi & Zamberlan	Eocene (Ypresian-Lutetian)		Italy		
Eudaronia orthensis	Sp. nov	Valid	Lozouet	Eocene		France	A species of Eudaronia.	
Eulima brightseatensis	Sp. nov	Valid	Govoni in Govoni et al.	Paleocene	Brightseat Formation	United States (Maryland)	A species of Eulima.	
Eulimella parvabrazensis	Sp. nov	Valid	Garvie	Eocene	Cook Mountain Formation	United States (Texas)	A species of Eulimella.	
Eulimella texana	Sp. nov	Valid	Garvie	Eocene	Cook Mountain Formation	United States (Texas)	A species of Eulimella.	
Eunaticina martingrossi	Nom. nov	Valid	Harzhauser, Landau & Guzhov	Miocene		Austria; Bulgaria; Romania; Spain	A species of Eunaticina; a replacement name for Natica hoernesi Hilber (1879).	
Euspira albrechti	Sp. nov	Valid	Janssen & Stein	Miocene		Germany	A species of Euspira.	
Euspira amitrovi	Sp. nov	Valid	Harzhauser, Landau & Guzhov	Miocene		Georgia; Russia (Adygea; Karachay-Cherkessia; Krasnodar Krai; Stavropol Krai)	A species of Euspira.	
Euspira incus	Sp. nov	Valid	Harzhauser, Landau & Guzhov	Miocene	Dej Formation	Romania	A species of Euspira.	
Euspira merlei	Sp. nov	Valid	Harzhauser, Landau & Guzhov	Miocene	Dej Formation	Austria; Romania	A species of Euspira.	
Euspira moravica	Sp. nov	Valid	Harzhauser, Landau & Guzhov	Miocene		Czech Republic	A species of Euspira.	
Euspira schumacheri	Sp. nov	Valid	Janssen & Stein	Miocene		Germany	A species of Euspira.	
Euspira vinitor	Sp. nov	Valid	Harzhauser, Landau & Guzhov	Miocene	Grund Formation	Austria	A species of Euspira.	
Euspira vohlandae	Sp. nov	Valid	Harzhauser, Landau & Guzhov	Miocene	Ritzing Formation	Austria	A species of Euspira.	
Euspira wagramensis	Sp. nov	Valid	Harzhauser, Landau & Guzhov	Miocene	Fels Formation	Austria	A species of Euspira.	
Euthria galopimi	Sp. nov	Valid	Landau, da Silva & Harzhauser	Pliocene		Portugal	A species of Euthria.	
Euthria lockleyi	Sp. nov	Valid	Landau, da Silva & Harzhauser	Pliocene		Portugal	A species of Euthria.	
Exilia kantori	Sp. nov	Valid	Garvie	Eocene	Weches Formation	United States (Texas)	A species of Exilia.	
Exilia wechesensis	Sp. nov	Valid	Garvie	Eocene	Weches Formation	United States (Texas)	A species of Exilia.	
Falsifusus nacogdochensis	Sp. nov	Valid	Garvie	Eocene	Cane River Formation	United States (Texas)	A member of the family Columbariidae.	
Falsifusus spiralis	Sp. nov	Valid	Garvie	Eocene	Cook Mountain Formation	United States (Texas)	A member of the family Columbariidae.	
Falsifusus sublimis	Sp. nov	Valid	Garvie	Eocene	Weches Formation	United States (Texas)	A member of the family Columbariidae.	
Favartia kovacsi	Sp. nov	Valid	Harzhauser, Landau & Merle	Miocene	Baden Formation	Austria	A species of Favartia.	
Ficulomorpha eocaenica	Sp. nov	Valid	Garvie	Eocene	Gosport Sand	United States (Alabama)	A member of the family Volutidae.	
Figovina	Gen. et sp. et comb. nov	Valid	Harzhauser, Landau & Guzhov	Miocene		Austria; Bulgaria; Czech Republic; Hungary; Moldova; Poland; Romania; Slovakia; Ukraine	A member of the family Naticidae. The type species is F. yasenivensis; genus also includes "Natica" szobiensis Strausz (1959) and "Natica helicina" sarmatica Friedberg (1938; raised to the rank of the species F. sarmatica.	
Fissurellidea eogentis	Sp. nov	Valid	Garvie	Eocene		United States (Texas)	A species of Fissurellidea.	
Fusinus pseudopagoda	Sp. nov	Valid	Garvie	Eocene	Cook Mountain Formation	United States (Texas)	A species of Fusinus.	
Gamizyga lenterotunda	Sp. nov	Valid	Anderson, Shares & Boardman	Carboniferous	Palo Pinto (Wynn) Limestone	United States (Texas)	A member of the family Pseudozygopleuridae.	
Gemmula complanata	Sp. nov	Valid	Garvie	Eocene	Weches Formation	United States (Texas)	A species of Gemmula.	
Germanigemmula	Gen. et 2 sp. nov	Valid	Janssen & Stein	Miocene		Germany	A member of the family Turridae. Genus includes new species G. noduliperdens and G. pseudobadensis.	
Gregorioiscala ascialis	Sp. nov	Valid	Harzhauser & Landau	Miocene		Czech Republic	A species of Gregorioiscala.	
Gyraulus ianus	Sp. nov	Valid	Neubauer in Neubauer, Mandic & Sebe	Miocene	Kiskunhalas Formation	Hungary	A species of Gyraulus.	
Gyraulus magyari	Sp. nov	Valid	Neubauer in Neubauer, Mandic & Sebe	Miocene	Kiskunhalas Formation	Hungary	A species of Gyraulus.	
Gyraulus pseudodalmaticus	Sp. nov	Valid	Neubauer in Neubauer, Mandic & Sebe	Miocene	Kiskunhalas Formation	Hungary	A species of Gyraulus.	
Haliotis plioetrusca	Sp. nov	Valid	Dominici et al.	Pliocene		Italy	A species of Haliotis.	
Harpa atascosita	Sp. nov	Valid	Garvie	Eocene	Weches Formation	United States (Texas)	A species of Harpa.	
Hastula (Bulbihastula) iuga	Sp. nov	Valid	Garvie	Eocene	Cook Mountain Formation	United States (Texas)	A species of Hastula.	
Heligmotoma nacogdochensis	Sp. nov	Valid	Garvie	Eocene	Weches Formation	United States (Texas)	A member of the family Melongenidae.	
Hemiacirsa abiaeformis	Sp. nov	Valid	Harzhauser & Landau	Miocene	Baden Formation	Austria; Hungary	A wentletrap belonging to the subfamily Epitoniinae.	
Hemiacirsa incusa	Sp. nov	Valid	Harzhauser & Landau	Miocene	Baden Formation	Austria	A wentletrap belonging to the subfamily Epitoniinae.	
Hemiacirsa superelongata	Sp. nov	Valid	Harzhauser & Landau	Miocene	Dej Formation	Romania	A wentletrap belonging to the subfamily Epitoniinae.	
Hemicerithium caucasicum	Sp. nov	Valid	Harzhauser, Guzhov & Landau	Miocene		Crimea; Georgia; Russia (Adygea; Krasnodar Krai; Stavropol Krai); Turkey		
Hemicerithium kovacsi	Sp. nov	Valid	Harzhauser, Guzhov & Landau	Oligocene/Miocene		Hungary		
Hemicycla puntallana	Sp. nov	Valid	Hutterer			Spain (Canary Islands)	A species of Hemicycla.	
Hemisinus amazonicus	Sp. nov		Simone & Ramos	Neogene	Solimões Formation	Brazil	A species of Hemisinus.	
Hesperiturris acuticosta	Sp. nov	Valid	Garvie	Eocene	Cane River Formation	United States (Texas)	A member of the family Turridae.	
Hexaplex nudus	Sp. nov	Valid	Garvie	Eocene	Cook Mountain Formation	United States (Texas)	A species of Hexaplex.	
Hexaplex tejasensis	Sp. nov	Valid	Garvie	Eocene	Weches Formation	United States (Texas)	A species of Hexaplex.	
Hirtoscala ceruchus	Sp. nov	Valid	Harzhauser & Landau	Miocene	Loibersdorf Formation	Austria	A wentletrap belonging to the subfamily Epitoniinae.	
Hirtoscala cornucopiae	Sp. nov	Valid	Harzhauser & Landau	Miocene	Pińczów Formation	Austria; Poland	A wentletrap belonging to the subfamily Epitoniinae.	
Hirtoscala diplommatinaformis	Sp. nov	Valid	Harzhauser & Landau	Miocene		Czech Republic	A wentletrap belonging to the subfamily Epitoniinae.	
Hirtoscala hastata	Sp. nov	Valid	Harzhauser & Landau	Miocene	Baden Formation	Austria; Poland	A wentletrap belonging to the subfamily Epitoniinae.	
Hirtoscala holcovae	Sp. nov	Valid	Harzhauser & Landau	Miocene	Grund Formation	Austria; Hungary	A wentletrap belonging to the subfamily Epitoniinae.	
Hirtoscala pharos	Sp. nov	Valid	Harzhauser & Landau	Miocene	Dej Formation	Bosnia and Herzegovina; Bulgaria; Romania	A wentletrap belonging to the subfamily Epitoniinae.	
Hirtoscala steiningeri	Sp. nov	Valid	Harzhauser & Landau	Miocene	Loibersdorf Formation	Austria	A wentletrap belonging to the subfamily Epitoniinae.	
Hirtoscala uncinata	Sp. nov	Valid	Harzhauser & Landau	Miocene	Loibersdorf Formation	Austria	A wentletrap belonging to the subfamily Epitoniinae.	
Hopeiella kuitunensis	Sp. nov	Valid	Zhu	Paleogene	Anjihaihe Formation	China	A member of the family Bulinidae.	
Hyaloscala occidentalis	Sp. nov	Valid	Harzhauser & Landau	Miocene	Baden Formation	Austria	A wentletrap belonging to the subfamily Epitoniinae.	
Hyaloscala rainesi	Sp. nov	Valid	Harzhauser & Landau	Miocene	Baden Formation	Austria	A wentletrap belonging to the subfamily Epitoniinae.	
Hyaloscala rustica	Sp. nov	Valid	Harzhauser & Landau	Miocene	Baden Formation	Austria	A wentletrap belonging to the subfamily Epitoniinae.	
Indolithes viae	Sp. nov	Valid	Celzard	Miocene		Indonesia	A member of the family Clavilithidae.	
Islamia juliomarcosi	Sp. nov	Valid	Talaván-Serna	Neogene		Spain	A species of Islamia.	
Javacypraea	Gen. et 2 sp. nov	Valid	Lorenz	Neogene		Indonesia	A member of the family Cypraeidae. Genus includes new species J. epulsaepuli and J. hernia.	
Javamitra	Gen. et sp. nov	Valid	Dharma & Lorenz	Miocene		Indonesia	A member of the family Mitridae. The type species is J. frangkyloi.	
Jeanclaudella	Nom. nov	Valid	Monari & Conti	Middle Jurassic		Italy	A member of the family Eucyclidae; a replacement name for Aaleniella Conti & Fischer (1981).	
Jurilda stoppanii	Comb. nov	Valid	(Winkler)	Late Triassic (Rhaetian)		Germany	A member of the family Mathildidae; moved from Turritella stoppanii Winkler (1861).	
Kapalmerella mortoni protomortoni	Ssp. nov	Valid	Govoni in Govoni et al.	Paleocene	Brightseat Formation	United States (Maryland)		
Kestocenebra vermeiji	Sp. nov	Valid	Harzhauser, Landau & Merle	Miocene	Grund Formation	Austria; Czech Republic	A member of the family Muricidae.	
Knightinella? olonae	Sp. nov	Valid	Pieroni	Middle Triassic (Anisian)		Italy	A member of the family Trochonematidae.	
Lacinia pygmaea	Sp. nov	Valid	Govoni in Govoni et al.	Paleocene	Brightseat Formation	United States (Maryland)		
Lasserria	Gen. et sp. nov	Valid	Lozouet	Eocene		France	A member of the family Cerithiidae. The type species is L. cauneillensis.	
Latirus brevilenis	Sp. nov	Valid	Garvie	Eocene	Weches Formation	United States (Texas)	A species of Latirus.	
Leptosurcula alabamensis	Sp. nov	Valid	Garvie	Eocene	Gosport Sand	United States (Alabama)	A member of the family Clavatulidae.	
Leptosurcula nodofenestra	Sp. nov	Valid	Garvie	Eocene	Cook Mountain Formation	United States (Texas)	A member of the family Clavatulidae.	
Leucozonia barcoi	Sp. nov	Valid	Brunetti & Della Bella	Pliocene		Spain	A species of Leucozonia.	
Levella aturensis	Sp. nov	Valid	Lozouet	Oligocene		France	A member of the family Trochaclididae.	
Levifusus corcellae	Sp. nov	Valid	Gain	Eocene (Ypresian)		France		
Levifusus gracilis	Sp. nov	Valid	Garvie	Eocene	Weches Formation	United States (Texas)		
Levifusus irrasus lineatus	Ssp. nov	Valid	Garvie	Eocene	Cook Mountain Formation	United States (Mississippi)		
Librariscala costatissima	Sp. nov	Valid	Harzhauser & Landau	Miocene	Baden Formation	Austria; Turkey	A wentletrap belonging to the subfamily Epitoniinae.	
Liodorbis	Gen. et sp. nov	Valid	Lozouet	Eocene (Priabonian)		France	A possible member of the family Skeneidae. The type species is L. priabonica.	
Lippistes eocaenica	Sp. nov	Valid	Garvie	Eocene		United States (Texas)		
Lodderena chattica	Sp. nov	Valid	Lozouet	Oligocene		France	A species of Lodderena.	
Luria maxisabella	Sp. nov	Valid	Lorenz	Neogene		Indonesia	A species of Luria.	
Luria minisabella	Sp. nov	Valid	Lorenz	Neogene		Indonesia	A species of Luria.	
Lymnaea (Peregriana) krstici	Sp. nov		Kovalenko	Pliocene		Serbia	A member of the family Lymnaeidae.	
Lyncina cinagarensis	Sp. nov	Valid	Lorenz	Neogene		Indonesia	A species of Lyncina.	
Lyncina rundoi	Sp. nov	Valid	Lorenz	Neogene		Indonesia	A species of Lyncina.	
Lyocyclus lutetianus	Sp. nov	Valid	Lozouet	Eocene		France	A species of Lyocyclus.	
Lyocyclus priabonicus	Sp. nov	Valid	Lozouet	Eocene		France	A species of Lyocyclus.	
Lyocyclus sublutetianus	Sp. nov	Valid	Lozouet	Eocene		France	A species of Lyocyclus.	
Lyocyclus vanikoroiformis	Sp. nov	Valid	Lozouet	Eocene		France	A species of Lyocyclus.	
Macromphalina parvicostata	Sp. nov	Valid	Garvie	Eocene		United States (Texas)	A species of Macromphalina.	
Macromphalina parviexempla	Sp. nov	Valid	Garvie	Eocene		United States (Texas)	A species of Macromphalina.	
Magadis ultima	Sp. nov	Valid	Lozouet	Eocene		France	A member of the family Phenacolepadidae.	
Marmorovula	Gen. et 2 sp. nov	Valid	Celzard & Lorenz	Miocene		Indonesia	A member of the family Ovulidae. Genus includes M. volvens and M. subapicata.	
Mathilda (Fimbriatella) crebricosta	Sp. nov	Valid	Govoni in Govoni et al.	Paleocene	Brightseat Formation	United States (Maryland)	A species of Mathilda.	
Mathilda (Fimbriatella) marylandensis	Sp. nov	Valid	Govoni in Govoni et al.	Paleocene	Brightseat Formation	United States (Maryland)	A species of Mathilda.	
Mathilda (Mathilda) kauffmani	Sp. nov	Valid	Govoni in Govoni et al.	Paleocene	Brightseat Formation	United States (Maryland)	A species of Mathilda.	
Mazescala alata	Sp. nov	Valid	Harzhauser & Landau	Miocene	Baden Formation	Austria	A wentletrap belonging to the subfamily Epitoniinae.	
Meioceras smithvillensis	Sp. nov	Valid	Garvie	Eocene		United States (Texas)	A species of Meioceras.	
Melanella carinata	Sp. nov	Valid	Garvie	Eocene		United States (Texas)	A species of Melanella.	
Mesopelex godavariensis	Sp. nov	Valid	Hoffman & Little in Little et al.	Pleistocene	Krishna-Godavari Basin	Bay of Bengal, offshore eastern India	A species of Mesopelex.	
Metriomphalus (Metriomphalus) bhanu	Sp. nov		Saha et al.	Jurassic		India		
Metula lacombei	Sp. nov	Valid	Lozouet & van Cuyck	Oligocene		France	A species of Metula.	
Microcancilla parvastavensis	Sp. nov	Valid	Garvie	Eocene	Gosport Sand	United States (Alabama)	A species of Microcancilla.	
Microdrillia elongata	Sp. nov	Valid	Garvie	Eocene	Cook Mountain Formation	United States (Texas)	A species of Microdrillia.	
Microdrillia faba	Sp. nov	Valid	Garvie	Eocene	Gosport Sand	United States (Alabama)	A species of Microdrillia.	
Microstelma hoedemakersi	Sp. nov	Valid	Lozouet	Eocene		France	A species of Microstelma.	
Microsurcula praeintacta	Sp. nov	Valid	Garvie	Eocene	Weches Formation	United States (Texas)	A member of the family Raphitomidae.	
Microsurcula stromboida	Sp. nov	Valid	Garvie	Eocene	Cane River Formation	United States (Texas)	A member of the family Raphitomidae.	
Monsneritina gourguesi	Sp. nov	Valid	Symonds & Gain	Eocene		France		
Morum solus	Sp. nov	Valid	Hawke & Guyonneau	Pliocene to Pleistocene		Australia	A species of Morum.	
Murexiella squamosa	Sp. nov	Valid	Garvie	Eocene	Gosport Sand	United States (Alabama)	A member of the family Muricidae.	
Murexsul iuvenilis	Sp. nov	Valid	Garvie	Eocene	Cook Mountain Formation	United States (Texas)	A species of Murexsul.	
Muricopsis hystrix	Sp. nov	Valid	Harzhauser, Landau & Merle	Miocene	Dej Formation	Bulgaria; Hungary; Romania	A species of Muricopsis.	
Nanggulania americana	Sp. nov	Valid	Garvie	Eocene		United States (Texas)		
Naria bojongensis	Sp. nov	Valid	Lorenz	Neogene		Indonesia	A species of Naria.	
Naria miliariocellata	Sp. nov	Valid	Lorenz	Neogene		Indonesia	A species of Naria.	
Naria polypora	Sp. nov	Valid	Lorenz	Neogene		Indonesia	A species of Naria.	
Naria serratorhina	Sp. nov	Valid	Lorenz	Neogene		Indonesia	A species of Naria.	
Naria ventristriata	Sp. nov	Valid	Lorenz	Neogene		Indonesia	A species of Naria.	
Naticarius lucapedrialii	Sp. nov	Valid	Harzhauser, Landau & Guzhov	Miocene	Dej Formation	Bulgaria; Romania	A species of Naticarius.	
Neoberingius minamichitaensis	Sp. nov	Valid	Kawase	Miocene	Yamami Formation	Japan	A member of the family Buccinidae.	
Neverita elongata	Sp. nov	Valid	Garvie	Eocene		United States (Texas)	A species of Neverita.	
Neverita potomacensis	Sp. nov	Valid	Govoni in Govoni et al.	Paleocene	Brightseat Formation	United States (Maryland)	A species of Neverita.	
Nitidiscala baluki	Sp. nov	Valid	Harzhauser & Landau	Miocene	Dej Formation	Romania	A wentletrap belonging to the subfamily Epitoniinae.	
Nitidiscala bonfittoi	Sp. nov	Valid	Harzhauser & Landau	Miocene	Dej Formation	Poland; Romania; Slovakia	A wentletrap belonging to the subfamily Epitoniinae.	
Nitidiscala browni	Sp. nov	Valid	Harzhauser & Landau	Miocene	Dej Formation	Romania	A wentletrap belonging to the subfamily Epitoniinae.	
Nitidiscala connexicosta	Sp. nov	Valid	Harzhauser & Landau	Miocene		Czech Republic	A wentletrap belonging to the subfamily Epitoniinae.	
Nozeba nervii	Sp. nov	Valid	Pacaud	Paleocene (Danian)		Belgium	A species of Nozeba.	
Ocenebra breitenbergeri	Sp. nov	Valid	Harzhauser, Landau & Merle	Miocene	Tırtar Formation	Turkey	A species of Ocenebra.	
Ocenebra littoralis	Nom. nov	Valid	Harzhauser, Landau & Merle	Miocene	Loibersdorf Formation	Austria	A species of Ocenebra; a replacement name for Murex (Ocinebrina) erinaceus sublaevis Schaffer (1912).	
Ocenebra scorpio	Sp. nov	Valid	Harzhauser, Landau & Merle	Miocene	Grund Formation	Austria	A species of Ocenebra.	
Ocinebrina bellissima	Sp. nov	Valid	Harzhauser, Landau & Merle	Miocene	Dej Formation	Romania	A species of Ocinebrina.	
Ocinebrina s.l. praescalaris	Sp. nov	Valid	Harzhauser, Landau & Merle	Miocene	Baden Formation	Austria; Czech Republic	A member of the family Muricidae.	
Ocinebrinopsis	Gen. et comb. et 4 sp. nov	Valid	Harzhauser, Landau & Merle	Miocene		Austria; Bosnia and Herzegovina; Bulgaria; Czech Republic; France; Hungary; Italy; Moldova; Poland; Romania; Slovakia; Turkey; Ukraine	A member of the family Muricidae. The type species is "Ocenebra" orientalis Friedberg (1928); genus also includes "Ocinebrina" bertai Kovács (2020), "Murex" crassilabiatus Hilber (1879), "Murex (Occenebra)" credneri Hoernes & Auinger (1885), "Ocinebrina" deaki Kovács, Leél-Őssy & Vicián (2023), "Murex (Occenebra) sublavatus" var. grundensis Hoernes & Auinger (1885; raised to the rank of the species O. grundensis), "Tritonium" striatum Eichwald (1830), "Pollia" weinsteigensis Hoernes & Auinger (1890), "Fusus" coelatus (Dujardini, 1837) and "Murex" dertonensis Bellardi (1873), as well as new species O. aperta, O. dominicii, O. gregaria and O. subnuda.	
Ondina hinschi	Sp. nov	Valid	Janssen & Stein	Miocene		Germany	A species of Ondina.	
Onustus coqueremons	Sp. nov	Valid	Garvie	Eocene		United States (Texas)	A species of Onustus.	
Opaliopsis compacta	Sp. nov	Valid	Harzhauser & Landau	Miocene	Baden Formation	Czech Republic	A wentletrap belonging to the subfamily Nystiellinae.	
Ossacythara	Gen. et sp. nov	Valid	Garvie	Eocene		United States (Texas)	A member of the family Clathurellidae. The type species is O. wechesensis.	
Ovatipsa miocoloba	Sp. nov	Valid	Lorenz	Neogene		Indonesia	A species of Ovatipsa.	
Oxycypraea bicaudata	Sp. nov	Valid	Celzard & Alberti	Eocene		Italy		
Palaeoellobium	Gen. et sp. nov	Valid	Merle, Néraudeau & Tafforeau	Cretaceous (Albian-Cenomanian)	Charentese amber	France	A member of the family Ellobiidae. The type species is P. decampsi.	
Paleofusus wechesensis	Sp. nov	Valid	Garvie	Eocene	Weches Formation	United States (Texas)	A member of the family Melongenidae.	
Palmadusta universalis	Sp. nov	Valid	Lorenz	Neogene		Indonesia	A species of Palmadusta.	
Papillina dumosa wechesensis	Ssp. nov	Valid	Garvie	Eocene	Weches Formation	United States (Texas)	A member of the family Clavilithidae.	
Papuliscala aquaensis	Sp. nov	Valid	Harzhauser & Landau	Miocene	Baden Formation	Austria	A species of Papuliscala.	
Papuliscala hoffmani	Sp. nov	Valid	Harzhauser & Landau	Miocene	Baden Formation	Czech Republic	A species of Papuliscala.	
Papuliscala maysi	Sp. nov	Valid	Harzhauser & Landau	Miocene	Baden Formation	Czech Republic; Poland	A species of Papuliscala.	
Papuliscala parvicancellata	Sp. nov	Valid	Harzhauser & Landau	Miocene	Baden Formation	Austria; Poland	A species of Papuliscala.	
Papuliscala praeelongata	Sp. nov	Valid	Harzhauser & Landau	Miocene	Baden Formation	Czech Republic	A species of Papuliscala.	
Paralepetopsis bathyalus	Sp. nov	Valid	Hoffman & Little in Little et al.	Pleistocene	Krishna-Godavari Basin	Bay of Bengal, offshore eastern India	A species of Paralepetopsis.	
Pareuchelus multicarinatus	Sp. nov	Valid	Demyanov & Pacaud in Berezovsky, Demyanov & Pacaud	Eocene		Ukraine	A member of the family Liotiidae.	
Parthenina havekosti	Sp. nov	Valid	Janssen & Stein	Miocene		Germany	A species of Parthenina.	
Parthenina longiformis	Sp. nov	Valid	Garvie	Eocene	Cook Mountain Formation	United States (Texas)	A species of Parthenina.	
Parviscala abdita	Sp. nov	Valid	Harzhauser & Landau	Miocene	Baden Formation	Austria	A wentletrap belonging to the subfamily Epitoniinae.	
Parviscala badensis	Sp. nov	Valid	Harzhauser & Landau	Miocene	Baden Formation	Austria	A wentletrap belonging to the subfamily Epitoniinae.	
Parviscala lacinia	Sp. nov	Valid	Harzhauser & Landau	Miocene	Dej Formation	Austria; Bosnia and Herzegovina; Hungary; Romania; Ukraine	A wentletrap belonging to the subfamily Epitoniinae.	
Parviscala paratethyca	Sp. nov	Valid	Harzhauser & Landau	Miocene	Baden Formation	Austria	A wentletrap belonging to the subfamily Epitoniinae.	
Parviturbo hinxensis	Sp. nov	Valid	Lozouet	Miocene		France	A species of Parviturbo.	
Pasitheola marylandensis	Sp. nov	Valid	Govoni in Govoni et al.	Paleocene	Brightseat Formation	United States (Maryland)		
Payraudeautia profunda	Sp. nov	Valid	Harzhauser, Landau & Guzhov	Miocene	Baden Formation	Austria; Bulgaria; Czech Republic; Hungary; Poland; Romania; Slovakia	A species of Payraudeautia.	
Pazinotus aster	Sp. nov	Valid	Harzhauser, Landau & Merle	Miocene	Baden Formation	Austria; Czech Republic; Hungary; Poland	A species of Pazinotus.	
Pazinotus pulcher	Sp. nov	Valid	Harzhauser, Landau & Merle	Miocene	Baden Formation	Austria	A species of Pazinotus.	
Phalium (Semicassis) wechesensis	Sp. nov	Valid	Garvie	Eocene		United States (Texas)		
Phandella gosportensis	Sp. nov	Valid	Garvie	Eocene	Gosport Sand	United States (Alabama)		
Phyllonotus multilaminus	Sp. nov	Valid	Garvie	Eocene	Cook Mountain Formation	United States (Texas)	A species of Phyllonotus.	
Physa aequua	Sp. nov	Valid	Garvie	Eocene	Weches Formation	United States (Texas)	A species of Physa.	
Pithocerithium mediolanionense	Nom. nov	Valid	Harzhauser, Guzhov & Landau	Miocene		Austria; Croatia	A replacement name for Cerithium imperfectum Sieber (1937).	
Plagioconus mermuysi	Sp. nov	Valid	Roosen & Langeveld	Miocene		Netherlands	A cone snail.	
Planotectus chiusarellae	Sp. nov	Valid	Pieroni	Middle Triassic (Anisian)		Italy	A member of the family Euomphalidae.	
Pleurofusia imminutia	Sp. nov	Valid	Garvie	Eocene	Weches Formation	United States (Texas)		
Plocezyga ampla	Sp. nov	Valid	Anderson, Shares & Boardman	Carboniferous	East Mountain Shale	United States (Texas)	A member of the family Pseudozygopleuridae.	
Plocezyga pingurestis	Sp. nov	Valid	Anderson, Shares & Boardman	Carboniferous	Wayland Shale	United States (Texas)	A member of the family Pseudozygopleuridae.	
Plocezyga procera	Sp. nov	Valid	Anderson, Shares & Boardman	Carboniferous	Wayland Shale	United States (Texas)	A member of the family Pseudozygopleuridae.	
Polinices symondsi	Sp. nov	Valid	Garvie	Eocene		United States (Texas)	A species of Polinices.	
Porcellusia	Nom. nov	Valid	Dolin	Miocene		France; Italy	A member of the family Cypraeidae; a replacement name for Kayella Dolin (2024).	
Priscoficus lenis	Sp. nov	Valid	Garvie	Eocene		United States (Mississippi)		
Proconulus jhikadiensis	Sp. nov		Saha et al.	Jurassic		India		
Protoarchivolva	Gen. et sp. nov	Valid	Celzard & Alberti	Eocene		Italy	A member of the family Ovulidae. Genus includes new species P. aurorae.	
Protorotella gigas	Sp. nov	Valid	Amano in Amano et al.	Miocene	Sazen Formation	Japan	A member of the family Trochidae.	
Protosurcula obesus	Sp. nov	Valid	Garvie	Eocene	Weches Formation	United States (Texas)	A member of Conoidea of uncertain affinities.	
Pseudocirsope feorra	Sp. nov	Valid	Govoni in Govoni et al.	Paleocene	Brightseat Formation	United States (Maryland)		
Pseudolinices	Gen. et comb. nov	Valid	Harzhauser, Landau & Guzhov	Miocene and Pliocene		Austria; Bosnia and Herzegovina; Bulgaria; Croatia; Czech Republic; France; Georgia; Hungary; Italy; Moldova; Poland; Portugal; Romania; Serbia; Slovakia; Spain; Turkey; Ukraine	A member of the family Naticidae. The type species is "Natica" empina De Gregorio (1885); genus also includes "Natica (Polinices)" proredempta Sacco (1890), "Natica" redempta Michelotti (1847), "Natica (Polynices)" pseudoredempta Friedberg (1923) and "Natica (Polynices)" staszici Friedberg (1923).	
Pseudoliva longicostata	Sp. nov	Valid	Govoni in Govoni et al.	Paleocene	Brightseat Formation	United States (Maryland)	A species of Pseudoliva.	
Pseudomalaxis gosportensis	Sp. nov	Valid	Garvie	Eocene	Gosport Sand	United States (Alabama)	A member of the family Architectonicidae.	
Pseudotorinia bieleri	Sp. nov	Valid	Garvie	Eocene	Weches Formation	United States (Texas)	A species of Pseudotorinia.	
Pseudovertagus canudai	Sp. nov	Valid	Kase, Fernando & Aguilar	Pleistocene	Tuktuk Formation	Philippines	A species of Pseudovertagus.	
Pterotheca xiushanensis	Sp. nov	Valid	Li et al.	Silurian (Telychian)	Xiushan Formation	China		
Pterotheca yongshunensis	Sp. nov	Valid	Li et al.	Silurian (Telychian)	Xiushan Formation	China		
Pterynopsis guzhovi	Nom. nov	Valid	Harzhauser, Landau & Merle	Miocene		Ukraine	A species of Pterynopsis; a replacement name for Murex affinis Eichwald (1830).	
Pterynotus robustus	Sp. nov	Valid	Garvie	Eocene	Cane River Formation	United States (Texas)	A species of Pterynotus.	
Ptychosalpinx texana	Sp. nov	Valid	Garvie	Eocene		United States (Texas)	A species of Ptychosalpinx.	
Punctiscala moravica	Sp. nov	Valid	Harzhauser & Landau	Miocene	Baden Formation	Czech Republic	A wentletrap belonging to the subfamily Epitoniinae.	
Puposyrnola palus	Sp. nov	Valid	Garvie	Eocene	Cane River Formation	United States (Texas)	A species of Puposyrnola.	
Puposyrnola toulmini	Sp. nov	Valid	Govoni in Govoni et al.	Paleocene	Brightseat Formation	United States (Maryland)	A species of Puposyrnola.	
Purpurina mahalanobisi	Sp. nov		Saha et al.	Jurassic		India		
Pusia crassiornata	Sp. nov	Valid	Biskupič & Kovács	Miocene	Lajta Limestone Formation	Hungary	A species of Pusia.	
Pusia palmulleri	Sp. nov	Valid	Biskupič & Kovács	Miocene	Lajta Limestone Formation	Hungary	A species of Pusia.	
Pusia pseudomoravica	Sp. nov	Valid	Biskupič & Kovács	Miocene	Lajta Limestone Formation	Hungary	A species of Pusia.	
Pustularia primavera	Sp. nov	Valid	Lorenz	Neogene		Indonesia	A species of Pustularia.	
Pyrgula sopianae	Sp. nov	Valid	Neubauer in Neubauer, Mandic & Sebe	Miocene	Szászvár Formation	Hungary	A species of Pyrgula.	
Ranella murus	Sp. nov	Valid	Garvie	Eocene		United States (Texas)	A species of Ranella.	
Rhizorus spinosus	Sp. nov	Valid	Garvie	Eocene	Weches Formation	United States (Texas)	A member of the family Rhizoridae.	
Ringicula goerneri	Sp. nov	Valid	Janssen & Stein	Miocene		Germany	A species of Ringicula.	
Robbanacca	Gen. et comb. nov	Valid	Harzhauser, Landau & Guzhov	Miocene		Slovakia	A member of the family Naticidae. The type species is "Polinices" cerovaensis Harzhauser in Harzhauser, Mandic & Schlögl (2011).	
Scala polonica	Sp. nov	Valid	Harzhauser & Landau	Miocene	Pińczów Formation	Poland	A wentletrap belonging to the subfamily Epitoniinae.	
Scaphander (Priscaphander) potomacensis	Sp. nov	Valid	Govoni in Govoni et al.	Paleocene	Brightseat Formation	United States (Maryland)	A species of Scaphander.	
Scaphander punctatus	Sp. nov	Valid	Garvie	Eocene	Gosport Sand	United States (Alabama)	A species of Scaphander.	
Scaphella burlesonensis	Sp. nov	Valid	Garvie	Eocene	Cook Mountain Formation	United States (Texas)	A species of Scaphella.	
Scobinella (Moniliopsis) elegansa	Sp. nov	Valid	Garvie	Eocene	Weches Formation	United States (Texas)	A member of Conoidea belonging to the family Borsoniidae.	
Sconsia wrigleyi	Sp. nov	Valid	Garvie	Eocene		United States (Texas)	A species of Sconsia.	
Searlesia duplicata	Sp. nov	Valid	Garvie	Eocene	Weches Formation	United States (Texas)	A member of Buccinoidea of uncertain affinities.	
Seguenzia lahitetensis	Sp. nov	Valid	Lozouet	Miocene		France	A species of Seguenzia.	
Seguenzia macrodentata	Sp. nov	Valid	Lozouet	Eocene		France	A species of Seguenzia.	
Seila quinquecarinata	Sp. nov	Valid	Bouchard et al.	Pleistocene (Gelasian)		France	A species of Seila.	
Sheppardiconcha turritella	Sp. nov		Simone & Ramos	Neogene	Solimões Formation	Brazil	A member of the family Pachychilidae.	
Sigaretotrema vindobonense	Sp. nov	Valid	Harzhauser, Landau & Guzhov	Miocene	Baden Formation	Austria	A member of the family Naticidae.	
Sigmesalia gnoma	Sp. nov	Valid	Govoni in Govoni et al.	Paleocene	Brightseat Formation	United States (Maryland)		
Sigmesalia palmerae	Sp. nov	Valid	Govoni in Govoni et al.	Paleocene	Brightseat Formation	United States (Maryland)		
Sinoplanorbis junggarensis	Sp. nov	Valid	Zhu	Paleogene	Anjihaihe Formation	China	A member of the family Bulinidae.	
Sinum magnificum	Sp. nov	Valid	Harzhauser, Landau & Guzhov	Miocene	Grund Formation	Austria	A species of Sinum.	
Siphonalia (Katherinalia) multiformis	Sp. nov	Valid	Garvie	Eocene	Cook Mountain Formation	United States (Texas)	A species of Siphonalia.	
Siphonalia (Katherinalia) neptuniformis	Sp. nov	Valid	Garvie	Eocene	Cook Mountain Formation	United States (Texas)	A species of Siphonalia.	
Siphonalia potomacensis	Sp. nov	Valid	Govoni in Govoni et al.	Paleocene	Brightseat Formation	United States (Maryland)	A species of Siphonalia.	
Skenea castinensis	Sp. nov	Valid	Lozouet	Oligocene		France	A species of Skenea.	
Skenea enricoi	Sp. nov	Valid	Bongiardino et al.	Pliocene		Italy	A species of Skenea.	
Skenea touzini	Sp. nov	Valid	Lozouet	Oligocene		France	A species of Skenea.	
Solariorbis laurelae	Sp. nov	Valid	Govoni in Govoni et al.	Paleocene	Brightseat Formation	United States (Maryland)	A species of Solariorbis.	
Staphylaea intercostata	Sp. nov	Valid	Lorenz	Neogene		Indonesia	A species of Staphylaea.	
Staphylaea kevini	Sp. nov	Valid	Lorenz	Neogene		Indonesia	A species of Staphylaea.	
Sthenorytis simoni	Sp. nov	Valid	Harzhauser & Landau	Miocene		Germany	A wentletrap belonging to the subfamily Epitoniinae.	
Subuliscala breitenbergeri	Sp. nov	Valid	Harzhauser & Landau	Miocene	Grund Formation	Austria; Hungary	A wentletrap belonging to the subfamily Epitoniinae.	
Subuliscala pseudobanoni	Sp. nov	Valid	Harzhauser & Landau	Miocene	Grund Formation	Austria	A wentletrap belonging to the subfamily Epitoniinae.	
Surculamella	Gen. et sp. nov	Valid	Garvie	Eocene		United States (Texas)	A member of the superfamily Conoidea belonging to the family Surculitidae. The type species is S. parvabrazensis.	
Surculites montgomeriensis	Sp. nov	Valid	Garvie	Eocene	Moodys Branch Formation	United States (Louisiana)	A member of Conoidea belonging to the family Surculitidae.	
Talostolida moretzsohni	Sp. nov	Valid	Lorenz	Neogene		Indonesia	A species of Talostolida.	
Tectonatica scutaria	Nom. nov	Valid	Harzhauser, Landau & Guzhov	Miocene		Austria; Romania	A species of Tectonatica; a replacement name for Natica transgrediens elata Schaffer (1912).	
Teinostoma (Megatyloma) gosportensis	Sp. nov	Valid	Garvie	Eocene	Gosport Sand	United States (Alabama)		
Tethynices	Gen. et comb. nov	Valid	Harzhauser, Landau & Guzhov	Miocene, possibly also Pliocene/Pleistocene		Czech Republic; Italy; Japan?	A member of the family Naticidae. The type species is "Natica" plicatulaeformis Kittl (1887); genus also includes "Natica (Naticina) catena" var. prohelicina Sacco (1890; raised to the rank of the species T. prohelicina) and possibly "Pliconacca" atricapilla sensu Majima (1989).	
Theodiscella	Nom. nov	Valid	Harzhauser, Guzhov & Landau	Miocene to Pleistocene		Austria; Azerbaijan; Bulgaria; Czech Republic; Georgia; Hungary; Italy; Moldova; Poland; Romania; Russia (Adygea; Chechnya; Karachay-Cherkessia; Stavropol Krai); Slovakia; Spain; Turkey; Ukraine	A member of the family Potamididae; a replacement name for Theodisca Harzhauser, Guzhov & Landau (2023).	
Thericium argillosum	Sp. nov	Valid	Biskupič	Miocene	Hrušky Formation	Slovakia	A member of the family Cerithiidae.	
Thericium basilicum	Sp. nov	Valid	Harzhauser, Guzhov & Landau	Miocene		Moldova		
Thericium bursucense	Sp. nov	Valid	Harzhauser, Guzhov & Landau	Miocene		Moldova		
Thericium chamaeleo	Sp. nov	Valid	Harzhauser, Guzhov & Landau	Miocene	Dej Formation	Romania		
Thericium miodacicum	Sp. nov	Valid	Harzhauser, Guzhov & Landau	Miocene		Hungary; Romania		
Thericium posidoniaphilum	Sp. nov	Valid	Harzhauser, Guzhov & Landau	Miocene	Baden Formation	Austria; Hungary; Poland		
Thericium putzgruberi	Nom. nov	Valid	Harzhauser, Guzhov & Landau	Miocene		Austria	A replacement name for Cerithium europaeum May. var. acuminata Schaffer (1912).	
Thericium vovkotrubense	Sp. nov	Valid	Harzhauser, Guzhov & Landau	Miocene		Ukraine		
Thericium zhizhchenkoi	Sp. nov	Valid	Harzhauser, Guzhov & Landau	Miocene		Russia (Adygea; Karachay-Cherkessia; Krasnodar Krai; Stavropol Krai)		
Timbellus kovacsi	Sp. nov	Valid	Harzhauser, Landau & Merle	Miocene		Czech Republic; Romania	A species of Timbellus.	
Timbellus weinmannae	Sp. nov	Valid	Harzhauser, Landau & Merle	Miocene	Dej Formation	Austria; Italy; Romania	A species of Timbellus.	
Tonstrina	Gen. et comb. nov	Valid	Symonds & Gain	Eocene		France	A member of the family Neritidae. The type species is "Neritina" malescoti Vasseur (1882).	
Tornus beadata	Sp. nov	Valid	Garvie	Eocene		United States (Texas)	A species of Tornus.	
Trigonostoma langenfeldicum	Sp. nov	Valid	Janssen & Stein	Miocene		Germany	A species of Trigonostoma.	
Tritia waltonensis	Nom. nov	Valid	Moerdijk, Rijken & Pouwer	Pliocene	Red Crag Formation	United Kingdom	A species of Tritia; a replacement name for Buccinum granulatum Sowerby (1815).	
Tritia zeelandica	Sp. nov	Valid	Moerdijk, Rijken & Pouwer	Pleistocene (Eemian)	Eem Formation	Netherlands; United Kingdom	A species of Tritia.	
Trochaclis inflata	Sp. nov	Valid	Lozouet	Oligocene		France	A species of Trochaclis.	
Trochaclis pustulosa	Sp. nov	Valid	Lozouet	Oligocene		France	A species of Trochaclis.	
Trochilepas	Gen. et sp. nov	Valid	Garvie	Eocene		United States (Texas)	A member of the family Lepetidae. The type species is T. harasewychia.	
Trochocerithium oritatense	Sp. nov	Valid	Amano in Amano et al.	Miocene	Sazen Formation	Japan	A member of the family Plesiotrochidae.	
Trypanotopsis lisbonensis	Sp. nov	Valid	Garvie	Eocene		United States (Alabama)	A member of the family Turridae.	
Turbonilla parallela	Sp. nov	Valid	Garvie	Eocene	Weches Formation	United States (Texas)	A species of Turbonilla.	
Turbonilla pseudoeulimella	Sp. nov	Valid	Garvie	Eocene	Weches Formation	United States (Texas)	A species of Turbonilla.	
Turritella prehumerosa	Sp. nov	Valid	Govoni in Govoni et al.	Paleocene	Brightseat Formation	United States (Maryland)	A species of Turritella.	
Unitas gosportensis	Sp. nov	Valid	Garvie	Eocene	Gosport Sand	United States (Alabama)	A species of Unitas.	
Unitas wechesensis	Sp. nov	Valid	Garvie	Eocene	Weches Formation	United States (Texas)	A species of Unitas.	
Villiersiella praeattenuata	Nom. nov	Valid	Janssen & Stein	Miocene		Germany	A replacement name for Mangelia pseudattenuata Gürs (2001).	
Vitrinella (Vitrinellops) clarkmartinorum	Sp. nov	Valid	Govoni in Govoni et al.	Paleocene	Brightseat Formation	United States (Maryland)	A species of Vitrinella.	
Volutocorbis claibornica	Sp. nov	Valid	Garvie	Eocene	Cook Mountain Formation	United States (Texas)	A member of the family Volutidae.	
Volutocorbis quadrataformis	Sp. nov	Valid	Garvie	Eocene	Cook Mountain Formation	United States (Texas)	A member of the family Volutidae.	
Wrigleya mandilei	Sp. nov	Valid	Leroy	Eocene		France	A member of the family Buccinidae.	
Zikkuratia danica	Sp. nov	Valid	Govoni in Govoni et al.	Paleocene	Brightseat Formation	United States (Maryland)		
Zoltania	Gen. et comb. nov	Valid	Harzhauser, Landau & Merle	Miocene		Austria; France; Hungary; Romania	A member of the family Muricidae. The type species is "Purpura" styriaca Hilber (1879).	

=== Gastropod research ===
- A study on the evolution of the columellar folds in gastropods, based on data from extant and fossil taxa, is published by Vermeij (2025).
- A study on the Ordovician gastropod assemblage from the Mójcza Limestone Formation (Poland), differing in composition from assemblages from Gondwana and from the Perunica and Avalonia microcontinents and possibly resulting from local speciation, is published by Dzik (2025).
- A study on the diversity of Permian and Triassic gastropods is published by Dominici (2025), who interprets increase of diversity of carnivorous gastropods during the Middle-Late Triassic transition as related to evolution of reef ecosystems at the same time.
- Evidence from the study of fossil shells of Cathaica orithyia from the Chinese Loess Plateau, indicative of a link between shell morphology and changes in climatic and environmental conditions linked to changes of Asian summer monsoons over the past 470,000 years, is presented by Shen et al. (2025).
- A study on ecological niche preferences of turritelline gastropods during the Cretaceous-Paleogene transition, providing evidence of niche stability of turritellines living before and after the Cretaceous–Paleogene extinction event, is published by Goodman et al. (2025).
- Bakayeva et al. (2025) revise the colombellinid genus Zittelia, and recognize 9 valid species from southern and central Europe.
- Evidence from the study of extant and fossil members of the family Littorinidae, indicating that differences in shell shape are correlated with genetic distances in extant members of the group and may aid recognition of fossil taxa, is presented by Shin & Allmon (2025).
- Evidence from the study of polymeric membranes in shells of Ecphora gardnerae from the Miocene strata of the St. Marys Formation (Maryland, United States), indicative of peptide and chitin preservation in the studied specimens, is presented by Cleland et al. (2025).
- Fossil material of extant African taxa Acteon senegalensis and Acteon maltzani is described from the Pleistocene strata from the Taranto area by La Perna, De Santis & Caldara (2025), providing evidence of presence of both species in southern Italy during the Last Interglacial.

== Other molluscs ==
Name	Novelty	Status	Authors	Age	Type locality	Location	Notes	Images
Acanthochitona mathiasi	Sp. nov	Valid	Dell'Angelo, Sosso & Taviani	Miocene		Italy	A chiton, a species of Acanthochitona.	
Avannaplax	Gen. et sp. nov		Oh, Park & Peel	Cambrian Stage 4	Aftenstjernesø Formation	Greenland	A chiton-like member of Aculifera. Genus includes new species A. midsommersoensis.	
Conocardium janischewskyi	Sp. nov		Mazaev	Carboniferous		Russia	A member of Rostroconchia.	
Emo	Gen. et sp. nov	Valid	Sutton et al.	Silurian	Coalbrookdale Formation	United Kingdom	An early aculiferan related to heloplacids. The type species is E. vorticaudum.	
Hanleya fratrum	Sp. nov	Valid	Dell'Angelo, Sosso & Taviani	Pleistocene		Italy	A chiton, a species of Hanleya.	
Hanleya sirenkoi	Sp. nov	Valid	Dell'Angelo, Sosso & Taviani	Pleistocene		Italy	A chiton, a species of Hanleya.	
Ischnochiton cluzaudi	Sp. nov	Valid	Dell'Angelo, Sosso & Taviani	Oligocene and Miocene		France	A chiton, a species of Ischnochiton.	
Ischnochiton krohi	Sp. nov	Valid	Dell'Angelo, Sosso & Taviani	Miocene		Romania; Ukraine	A chiton, a species of Ischnochiton.	
Ischnochiton lesporti	Sp. nov	Valid	Dell'Angelo, Sosso & Taviani	Miocene		France	A chiton, a species of Ischnochiton.	
Ischnochiton sigwartae	Sp. nov	Valid	Dell'Angelo, Sosso & Taviani	Pleistocene		Italy	A chiton, a species of Ischnochiton.	
Lepidochitona kieli	Sp. nov	Valid	Dell'Angelo, Sosso & Taviani	Miocene		Ukraine	A chiton, a species of Lepidochitona.	
Lepidochitona saitoi	Sp. nov	Valid	Dell'Angelo, Sosso & Taviani	Pleistocene		Italy	A chiton, a species of Lepidochitona.	
Lepidopleurus pseudocajetanus	Sp. nov	Valid	Dell'Angelo, Sosso & Taviani	Miocene/Pleistocene		Austria; France; Italy	A chiton, a species of Lepidopleurus.	
Lepidopleurus reitanoi	Sp. nov	Valid	Dell'Angelo, Sosso & Taviani	Pleistocene		Italy	A chiton, a species of Lepidopleurus.	
Leptochiton corticellii	Sp. nov	Valid	Dell'Angelo, Sosso & Taviani	Pleistocene		Italy	A chiton, a species of Leptochiton.	
Leptochiton prudenzae	Sp. nov	Valid	Dell'Angelo, Sosso & Taviani	Pliocene and Pleistocene		Greece; Italy	A chiton, a species of Leptochiton.	
Leptochiton rumani	Sp. nov	Valid	Dell'Angelo, Sosso & Taviani	Miocene		Slovakia	A chiton, a species of Leptochiton.	
Punk	Gen. et sp. nov	Valid	Sutton et al.	Silurian	Coalbrookdale Formation	United Kingdom	An early aculiferan related to modern aplacophorans. The type species is P. ferox.	
Qaleruaqia bronlundensis	Sp. nov		Oh, Park & Peel	Cambrian Stage 4	Aftenstjernesø Formation	Greenland	A member of Paleoloricata.	
Rhyssoplax garillii	Sp. nov	Valid	Dell'Angelo, Sosso & Taviani	Pliocene/Pleistocene		Italy	A chiton, a species of Rhyssoplax.	
Stenosemus praedolii	Sp. nov	Valid	Dell'Angelo, Sosso & Taviani	Miocene/Pleistocene		Italy	A chiton, a species of Stenosemus.	
Stenosemus rossoae	Sp. nov	Valid	Dell'Angelo, Sosso & Taviani	Pleistocene		Italy	A chiton, a species of Stenosemus.	
Stenosemus vendrascoi	Sp. nov	Valid	Dell'Angelo, Sosso & Taviani	Miocene		Italy	A chiton, a species of Stenosemus.	

=== Other molluscan research ===
- Redescription of the rostroconch species Hoarepora parrishi, based on data from new fossil material from the Moscovian Korobcheevo Formation (Ryazan Oblast, Russia) and Gzhelian Amerevo Formation (Moscow Oblast, Russia) that extends known geographical range of the species, is published by Mazaev (2025).

== General research ==
- New fossil material of molluscs, facilitating comparisons with faunas from other paleocontinents, is described from the Cambrian Stage 4 strata in North Greenland by Oh, Peel & Park (2025).
- Polechová, Ebbestad & Kröger (2025) revise the diversity of Ordovician (Floian) molluscs from the Cabrières Biota (Landeyran Formation; France).
- Evidence from the study of the fossil record of marine bivalves and gastropods from the Permian-Triassic transition, interpreted as indicating that taxonomic homogenization of the studied molluscs in marine communities after the Permian–Triassic extinction event was related to environmental changes that resulted in expansion of the preferred habitat of the survivors of extinction, is presented by Al Aswad et al. (2025).
- Evidence from the study of the fossil record of Early Jurassic gastropods and bivalves from the epicontinental seas of the north-western Tethys Ocean, indicative of a relationship between the thermal suitability of the studied animals and changes of their occupancy in response to climate changes during the Pliensbachian and Toarcian, is presented by Reddin et al. (2025).
- Description of the assemblage of ammonites and inoceramid bivalves from the Albian strata from the Mangyshlak Anticlinorium (Kazakhstan) is published by Kennedy & Walaszczyk (2025).
- Aiba & Mochizuki (2025) describe new fossil material of ammonites and inoceramid bivalves from the Taneichi Formation (Japan), and interpret the composition of the studied assemblage as indicating that the middle Member of the Taneichi Formation was deposited during the Santonian–early Campanian.
- Fergusen, Reed & García-Bellido (2025) determine lost pigmentation patterns in molluscan specimens from the Miocene Cadell Formation (Australia), interpret the pigmentation patterns of Lophiotoma murrayana as supporting its reassignment from the genus Lucerapex to Lophiotoma, and interpret the pigmentation of Maoricolpus murrayanus as similar to the pigmentation of extant Maoricolpus roseus, strengthening the arguments that the two species are synonymous.
- Kiel et al. (2025) study the composition of the gastropod and scaphopod assemblage from the Pliocene Kairuku Limestone (Papua New Guinea).
- Hsu, Osipova & Lin (2025) study the composition of the Pleistocene (Calabrian) assemblage of freshwater gastropods and bivalves from the Tananwan Formation (Taiwan), including shells of juvenile specimens of Sinotaia quadrata found within shells of female specimen, representing the second known finding of child-carrying viviparids in the fossil record.
- A study on the composition of the Late Pleistocene predominantly aquatic molluscan assemblage from the Glendale Fossil Site (Nevada, United States) is published by Mead et al. (2025).
- Ponder et al. (2025) review the fossil record of non-marine aquatic molluscs from Australia and New Zealand.
