= Ulrichoceras =

Ulrichoceras Temporal range: M Ordovician

Scientific classification
- Domain: Eukaryota
- Kingdom: Animalia
- Phylum: Mollusca
- Class: Cephalopoda
- Subclass: Nautiloidea
- Order: †Discosorida
- Family: †Cyrtogomphoceratidae
- Genus: †Ulrichoceras; Foerste, 1925

Ulrichoceras is recognised as the basal cyrtogomphoceratid genus, which is the source for the rest of the Cyrtogomphoceratidae as well as for the Westonoceratidae. The Cyrtogomphoceratidae are endogastric, the Westonoceratidae, exogastric.

Ulrichoceras has a cyrtoconic, endogastric shell that expands fairly rapidly to the middle of the body chamber, then contracts toward the aperture. The cross section is slightly depressed, atypical for cyrtogomphoceratids but not so for Reudemannoceratids; dorsal and ventro lateral sides are broadly rounded, the venter moderately flattened. Sutures have broad ventral lobes. The siphuncle is between the center and the venter; segments are short and not strongly contracted at the septal foremina, connecting rings are thickened and have enlarged bullettes.

Ulrichoceras, named by Foerste, 1925, type U. beloitense, comes from the Middle Ordovician of Wisconsin, U.S.A. It is intermediary in form between Reudemanoceras and the more derived, M -U Ordovician, Strandoceras.

== See also ==
- Nautiloid
- List of nautiloids
