= Parryoceras =

Parryoceras Temporal range: Middle and Late Ordovician

Scientific classification
- Domain: Eukaryota
- Kingdom: Animalia
- Phylum: Mollusca
- Class: Cephalopoda
- Subclass: Nautiloidea
- Order: †Discosorida
- Family: †Cyrtogomphoceratidae
- Genus: †Parryoceras; Sweet and Miller, 1957

Genus of molluscs

Parryoceras is a cyrtogomphoceratid similar to Strandoceras but with broadly expanded siphuncle segments and a nearly straight ventral line. The mature shell is thickened on the inside just behind the aperture resulting in a constriction in the internal mold at the adoral end.

Parryoceras comes from the middle and upper Ordovician of arctic Canada and Norway.
