= Kiaeroceras =

Kiaeroceras Temporal range: Late Ordovician

Scientific classification
- Kingdom: Animalia
- Phylum: Mollusca
- Class: Cephalopoda
- Subclass: Nautiloidea
- Order: †Discosorida
- Family: †Cyrtogomphoceratidae
- Genus: †Kiaeroceras; Strand, 1934

Extinct genus of molluscs

Kiaeroceras is a slender, nearly straight shelled, cyrogomphoceratid (Nautiloidea-Discosorida) from the Upper Ordovician of northern Europe (e.g. Norway). The cross section of the shell is compressed, height greater than width. The body chamber is slightly contracted so as to narrow toward the aperture, which in some is slightly flared. The venter, narrowly rounded. The siphuncle is close to the venter, septal necks short, connecting rings thick, bullettes prominent.

Kiaeroceras is thought to be derived from Strandoceras although derivation is possibly from Cyrtogomphoceras, which is intermediary in form.
