= Landeroceras =

Landeroceras Temporal range: M -?U Ordovician

Scientific classification
- Domain: Eukaryota
- Kingdom: Animalia
- Phylum: Mollusca
- Class: Cephalopoda
- Subclass: Nautiloidea
- Order: †Discosorida
- Family: †Cyrtogomphoceratidae
- Genus: †Landeroceras; Foerste, 1935

Extinct genus of molluscs

Landeroceras is a genus of straight shelled cyrtogomphoceratid from the Middle Ordovician Big Horn dolomite of Wyoming.

The shell of Landeroceras is a subcylindrical brevicone with the siphuncle on one side, determined as ventral. Siphuncle segments are short and well expanded into the chambers. Connecting rings are thick, septal necks cyrochoanitic to recumbent, bullettes markedly swollen.

Landeroceras is at the end of a small offshoot within the discosorid family Cyrtogomphoceratidae that also includes Cyrtogomphoceras, and not in the line which gave rise to the Phragmoceratidae.
