= Mazaevella =

Scientific classification
- Kingdom: Animalia
- Phylum: Mollusca
- Class: Bivalvia
- Order: Pectinida
- Family: †Annuliconchidae
- Genus: †Mazaevella; Shilekhin & Biakov, 2025
- Species: †M. placunensis

Binomial name
- †Mazaevella placunensis (Nelzina, 1958)

Extinct genus of bivalve

Mazaevella is an extinct genus of pectinid bivalve that belongs to the family Annuliconchidae. It lived in European Russia living from the Late Carboniferous to the Early Permian periods (Gzhelian-Sakmarian). The genus is currently monotypic with Mazaevella placunensis being the only species within the genus.

The shell of this genus is small being only 11 mm in height and 11.7 mm in length. It has a roughly rounded triangular shape. The left valve is nearly flat.

== Discovery ==
This genus was based specimens collected from three localities. The specific stratigraphic and sometimes even geographic information for many of these specimens are unclear. Adding to further confusion, the ranges and boundaries of these between these stratigraphic units have changed. The type material were uncovered from the Plakun Stone on the Chusovaya River.

=== Etymology ===
The generic name is in honor to Alexey V. Mazaev who is considered to be an expert on Molluscs, specifically gastropods and rostroconchs, of the Late Paleozoic era.
