= Grund Formation =

Geologic formation in Austria

- Stratigraphic range: Langhian (MN5)
- Type: Formation

Lithology
- Primary: Sandstone, siltstone

Location
- Country: Austria

The Grund Formation is a geologic formation in Austria. It preserves fossils dated to the Langhian age of the Miocene period.

== Fosil content ==
| Color key: Taxon / Reclassified taxon / Taxon falsely reported as present / Dubious taxon or junior synonym / Ichnotaxon / Ootaxon / Morphotaxon | Notes; Uncertain or tentative taxa are in small text; ~~crossed out~~ taxa are discredited. |

=== Molluscs ===
==== Gastropods ====
Gastropods of the Grund Formation
| Genus | Species | Location | Stratigraphic position | Material | Notes | Images |
|---|---|---|---|---|---|---|
| Kestocenebra | K. vermeiji | | | | A muricid gastropod | |
| Ocenebra | O. scorpio | | | | A ocenebrine muricid | |

== See also ==
- List of fossiliferous stratigraphic units in Austria
