= Cyrtogomphoceras =

Cyrtogomphoceras Temporal range: M. Ordovician - ?Silurian

Scientific classification
- Kingdom: Animalia
- Phylum: Mollusca
- Class: Cephalopoda
- Subclass: Nautiloidea
- Order: †Discosorida
- Family: †Cyrtogomphoceratidae
- Genus: †Cyrtogomphoceras; Foerste, 1924

Extinct genus of molluscs

Cyrtogomphoceras is a genus of nautiloid cephalopods, recognized by its large breviconic shell with a notable endogastric curvature. The shell is fusiform in profile, reaching maximum width at or near the base of body chamber, which narrows toward the aperture. The siphuncle is large and slightly removed from the ventral side, that with the concave longitudinal profile. Siphuncle segments are short, as are chambers; septal necks recurved, connecting rings thick, bullettes at the apical end of the rings swollen. Cameral deposits are lacking.

Cyrtogomphoceras seems to be derived from Strandoceras by a reduction in the degree of endogastric curvature and may have given rise to Landeroceras by a further evolutionary straightening of the shell.

Cyrtogomphoceras, named by Foeste, 1924, has been found in middle and upper Ordovician beds in North America and Greenland. Fossils identified as such have also been found in the Silurian of Estonia. The type species is Oncoceras magnun Whiteaves 1890.
