= Cyrtogomphoceratidae =

Cyrtogomphoceratidae Temporal range: M Ordovician - L Silurian

Scientific classification
- Domain: Eukaryota
- Kingdom: Animalia
- Phylum: Mollusca
- Class: Cephalopoda
- Subclass: Nautiloidea
- Order: †Discosorida
- Family: †Cyrtogomphoceratidae; Flower & Kummel, 1950

Extinct family of molluscs

The Cyrtogomphoceratidae are a family in the cephalopod order Discosorida that comprises genera commonly with compressed, endogastrically curved shells. Siphuncles lie close to the ventral side, segments are broadly inflated, connecting rings thick and apically expanded thick bullettes. Chambers are short, separated by shallow, dish shaped septa. Apertures are generally simple.

The Cyrtogomphoceratidae are derived from the discosorid family Reudemannoceratidae, probably from Reudemannoceras, through the ancestral genus Ulrichoceras, and have a range from the Middle Ordovician to the Lower Silurian.

The family includes:

- Cyrtogomphoceras
- Kiaeroceras
- Konglungenoceras
- Landeroceras
- Parryoceras
- Strandoceras
- Ulrichoceras

Ulrichoceras is also considered the source for the exogastric Westonoceratidae. The Cyrtogomphoceratidae, through Strandoceras, gave rise to the Silurian - L Devonian Phragmoceratidae which differ primarily in having thin connecting rings and variably modified, strongly contracted apertures.
