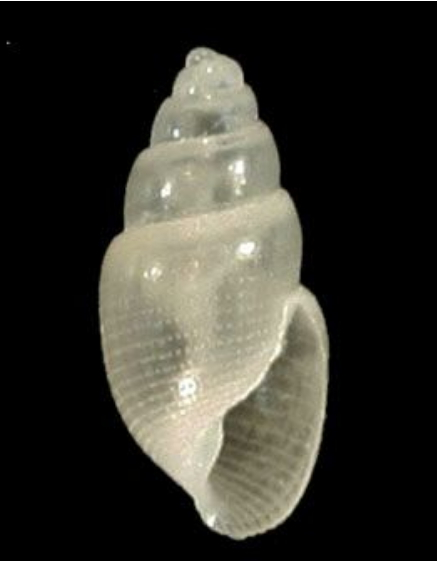
- Shell of Acteon maltzani (specimen at the Natural History Museum, Rotterdam)

Scientific classification
- Kingdom: Animalia
- Phylum: Mollusca
- Class: Gastropoda
- Superfamily: Acteonoidea
- Family: Acteonidae
- Genus: Acteon
- Species: A. maltzani

Binomial name
- Acteon maltzani Dautzenberg, 1910

Synonyms
- Actaeon maltzani Dautzenberg, 1910 (original combination); Actaeon senegalensis Maltzan, 1885 (preoccupied by Actaeon senegalensis (Petit de la Saussaye, 1851) )

= Acteon maltzani =

Species of marine gastropod

Acteon maltzani is a species of sea snail, a marine gastropod mollusc in the family Acteonidae.

== Description ==
The length of the shell varies between 2.5 mm and 6 mm.

== Distribution ==
This marine species occurs in the Atlantic Ocean off West Africa (Senegal), the Canary Islands and Cape Verde.
