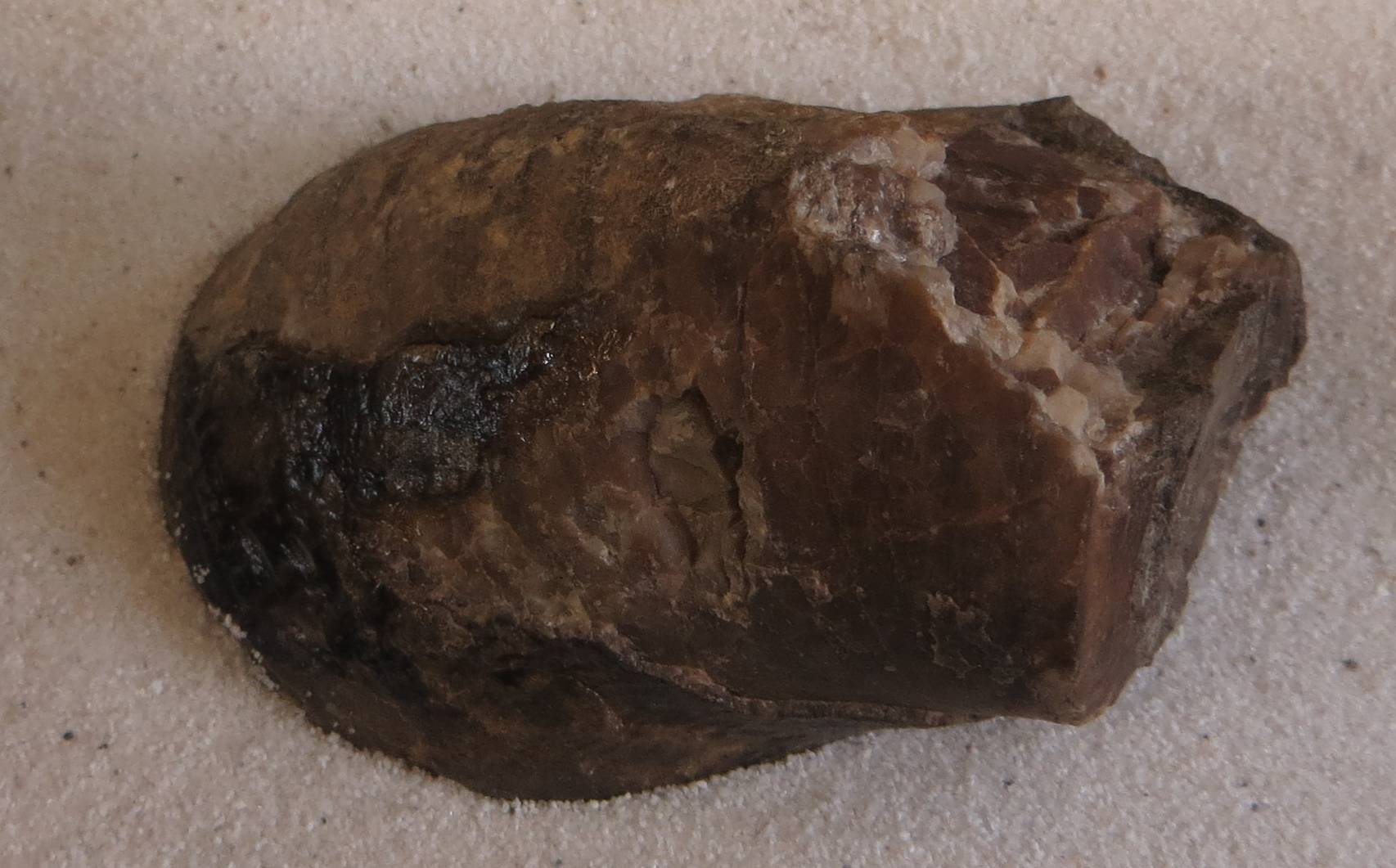
- Cranoceras depressum

Scientific classification
- Kingdom: Animalia
- Phylum: Mollusca
- Class: Cephalopoda
- Order: †Orthocerida
- Genus: †Cycloceras; M'Coy, 1844

= Cycloceras =

Cycloceras Temporal range: Ordovician-Permian

Extinct genus of nautiloids

Cycloceras is an extinct nautiloid cephalopod genus from the Carboniferous of Western Europe, (Ireland and Scotland) of unknown affinity with the Orthocerida.

== Taxonomy ==
Cycloceras was named by McCoy (1844 and assigned to the Michelinoceratida by Flower (1962)and to the Orthocerida by Sweet in Teichert et al. (1964); Cycloceras is possibly a member of the Cycloceratidae and may be synonymous with Perigrammoceras.

== Morphology ==
The type species of Cycloceras, C. annularis, is based in an internal mold of a body chamber on which the position of the siphuncle is indiscernible (Sweet 1964,) Species referred to Cycloceras are annulated, subcylindrical orthocones with no longitudinal ornamentation . Fig 186, p K258 Teichert et al. (1964) shows Cycloceras as narrow, gently expanding, annulated orthocone with a narrow subcentral siphuncle. Annuli (circular transverse bands or costae) are thick and close spaced, giving a corrugated appearance.
