= Strandoceras =

Strandoceras Temporal range: M -U Ordovician

Scientific classification
- Domain: Eukaryota
- Kingdom: Animalia
- Phylum: Mollusca
- Class: Cephalopoda
- Subclass: Nautiloidea
- Order: †Discosorida
- Family: †Cyrtogomphoceratidae
- Genus: †Strandoceras; Flower, 1940

Strandoceras is a strongly curved cyrtogomphoceratid with a laterally compressed cross section from the middle and upper Ordovician of Northern Europe; Estonia, Norway, the U.K.

The body chamber of Stradoceras is straighter and more slender than the chambered phragmocone; the venter narrowly rounded with a shallow hyponomic sinus; the aperture open, sutures with shallow lateral lobes. The siphuncle is close to the venter which is on the inside, endogastric curvature. Segments are large and broadly rounded; connecting rings thick, bullettes large.

Strandoceras gave rise to the Phragmoceratidae and very likely to Kiaeroceras and Cyrtogomphoceras, which in turn gave rise to Landeroceras, within the Cyrtogomphoceratidae
