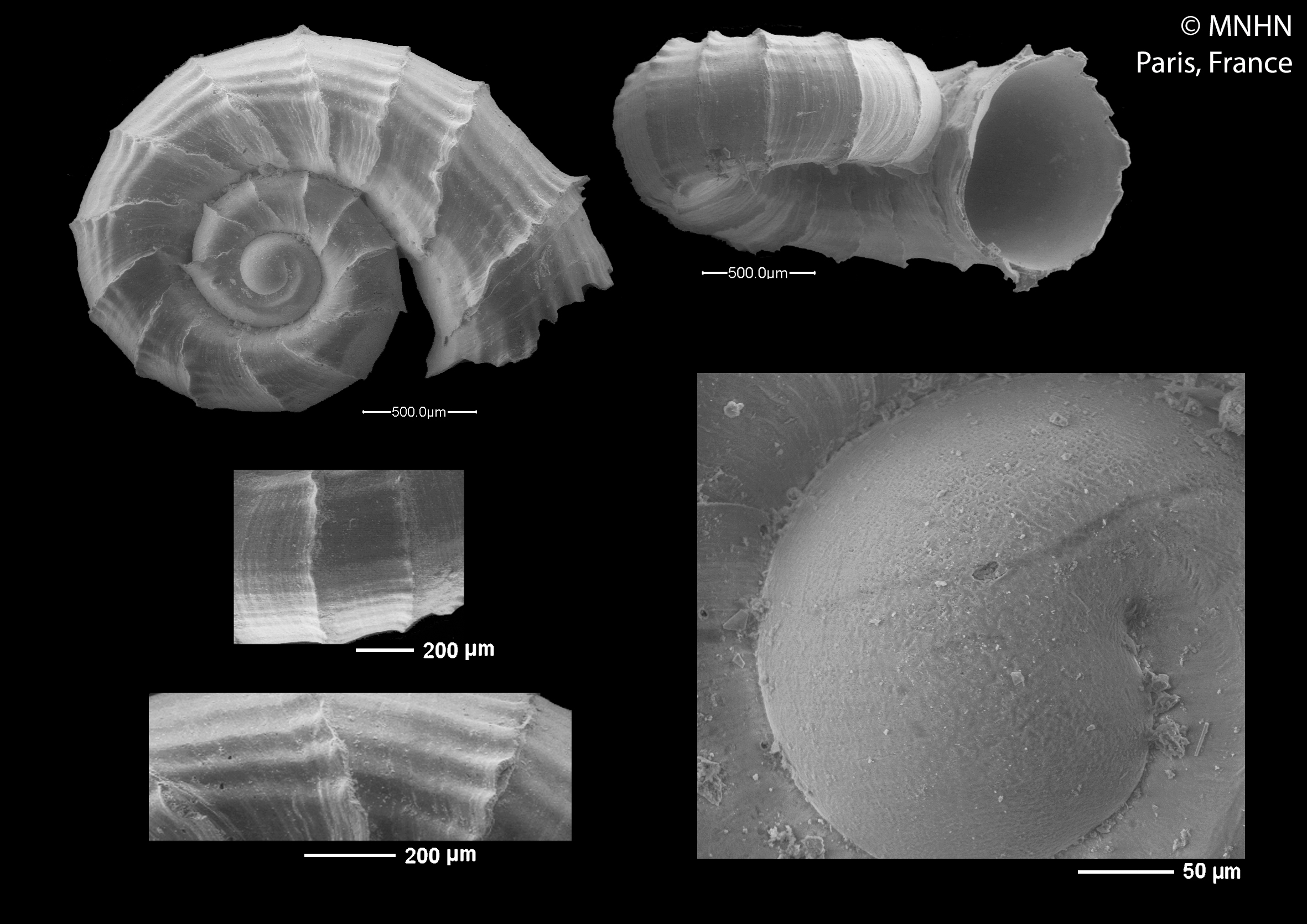
- Shell of Lyocyclus lluviamonzoae (holotype at MNHN, Paris)

Scientific classification
- Kingdom: Animalia
- Phylum: Mollusca
- Class: Gastropoda
- Subclass: Caenogastropoda
- Order: incertae sedis
- Family: Lyocyclidae
- Genus: Lyocyclus; Thiele, 1925

Type species
- Lyocyclus solutus Thiele, 1925

= Lyocyclus =

Genus of gastropods

Lyncina is a genus of sea snails, marine gastropod mollusks in the family Lyocyclidae.

== Species ==
- Lyocyclus aethiopicus Thiele, 1925
- Lyocyclus africaruedae Rubio & Rolán, 2018
- Lyocyclus angularis Rubio & Rolán, 2021
- Lyocyclus circuitus Rubio & Rolán, 2021
- Lyocyclus disjunctionis Rubio & Rolán, 2021
- Lyocyclus dispulsus Rubio & Rolán, 2021
- Lyocyclus distortus Rubio & Rolán, 2021
- Lyocyclus elephantus Rubio & Rolán, 2021
- Lyocyclus fijiensis Rubio & Rolán, 2021
- Lyocyclus funiculatus Rubio & Rolán, 2021
- Lyocyclus glaber Rubio & Rolán, 2021
- Lyocyclus guadeloupensis Rubio & Rolán, 2018
- Lyocyclus horroi Rubio & Rolán, 2021
- Lyocyclus intortus Rubio & Rolán, 2021
- Lyocyclus josemanuelrubioi Rubio & Rolán, 2021
- Lyocyclus juanchii Rubio & Rolán, 2021
- Lyocyclus lamellaris Rubio & Rolán, 2021
- Lyocyclus levilicii Rubio & Rolán, 2021
- Lyocyclus lluviamonzoae Rubio & Rolán, 2018
- Lyocyclus magnioris Rubio & Rolán, 2021
- Lyocyclus mexicanus Rubio & Rolán, 2018
- Lyocyclus micro Rubio & Rolán, 2021
- Lyocyclus microtuber Rubio & Rolán, 2021
- Lyocyclus pernambucensis (R. B. Watson, 1886)
- Lyocyclus protampla Rubio & Rolán, 2021
- Lyocyclus protangulata Rubio & Rolán, 2021
- Lyocyclus roselyae Fernández-Garcés, Rubio & Rolán, 2019
- Lyocyclus separatus Rubio & Rolán, 2021
- Lyocyclus similis Rubio & Rolán, 2021
- Lyocyclus simplex Rubio & Rolán, 2021
- Lyocyclus solutus Thiele, 1925
- Lyocyclus spinosus Thiele, 1925
- Lyocyclus squamosus Rubio & Rolán, 2021
- Lyocyclus tubae Rubio & Rolán, 2021
- Lyocyclus valdesquameus Rubio & Rolán, 2021
- Lyocyclus wareni Rubio & Rolán, 2021

Species brought into synonymy

- Lyocyclus biconcavus Thiele, 1925: synonym of Eudaronia biconcava (Thiele, 1925)
- Lyocyclus orientalis Thiele, 1925: synonym of Adeuomphalus orientalis (Thiele, 1925)
