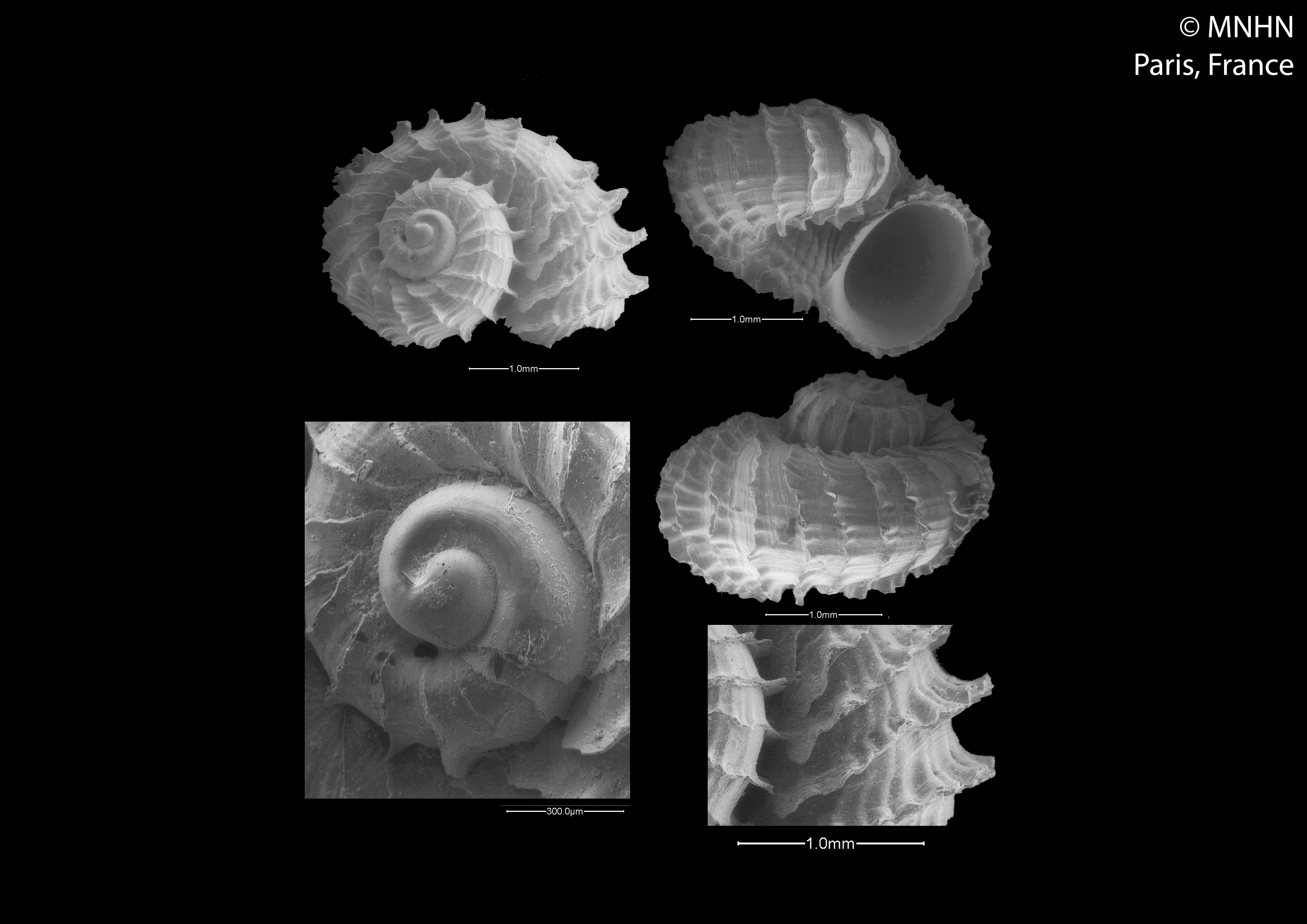
- Shell of Lyocyclus africaruedae (holotype at MNHN. Paris)

Scientific classification
- Kingdom: Animalia
- Phylum: Mollusca
- Class: Gastropoda
- Subclass: Caenogastropoda
- Order: incertae sedis
- Family: Lyocyclidae; Thiele, 1925

Genera
- See text

= Lyocyclidae =

Family of gastropods

Lyocyclidae is a taxonomic family of small sea snails, unassigned to an order of the subclass Caenogastropoda.

== Genera ==
- Lyocyclus Thiele, 1925
- Nescitus Rubio & Rolán, 2021
