= List of the Paleozoic life of Indiana =

This list of the Paleozoic life of Indiana contains the various prehistoric life-forms whose fossilized remains have been reported from within the US state of Indiana and are between 538.8 and 252.17 million years of age.

== A ==
- †Abatocrinus
  - †Abatocrinus grandis
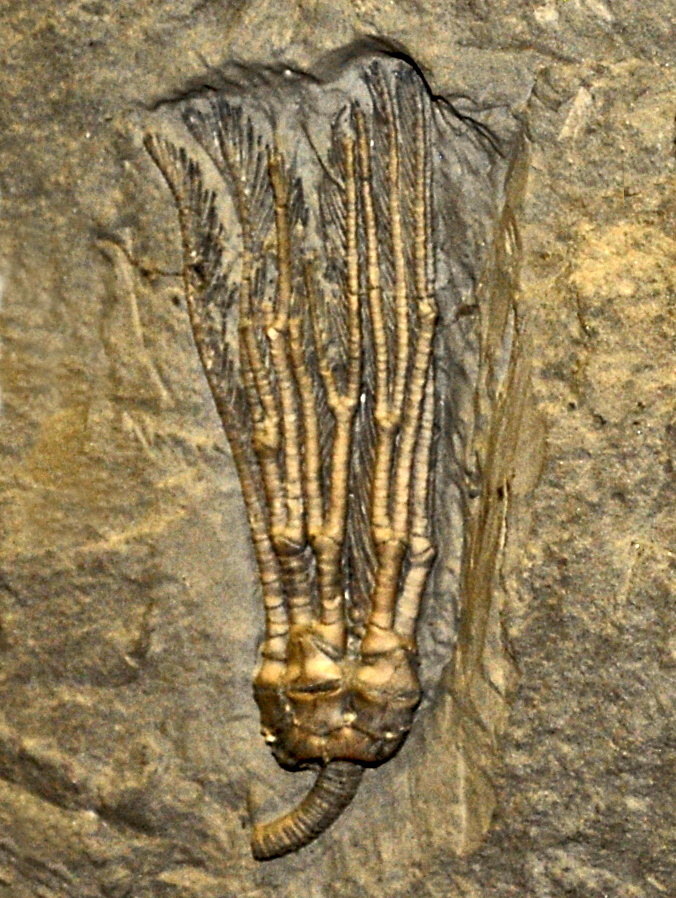
- Fossilized calyx of the Carboniferous crinoid ("sea lily") Abrotocrinus
  †Abrotocrinus
  - †Abrotocrinus coreyi
  - †Abrotocrinus nodosus
  - †Abrotocrinus unicus
- †Acacocrinus
  - †Acacocrinus americanus
- †Acanthopecten
  - †Acanthopecten procarboniferous
- †Achistrum
  - †Achistrum brevis – type locality for species
  - †Achistrum ludwigi
  - †Achistrum nicholsoni
  - †Achistrum triassicum
- †Achradocrinus
- †Acidaspis
- †Acinophyllum
  - †Acinophyllum davisi – type locality for species
- †Acratia
  - †Acratia similaris
- †Acrocrinus
  - †Acrocrinus constrictus
- † Acrophyllum
  - †Acrophyllum ellipticum
  - †Acrophyllum oneidaense
  - †Acrophyllum rugosum
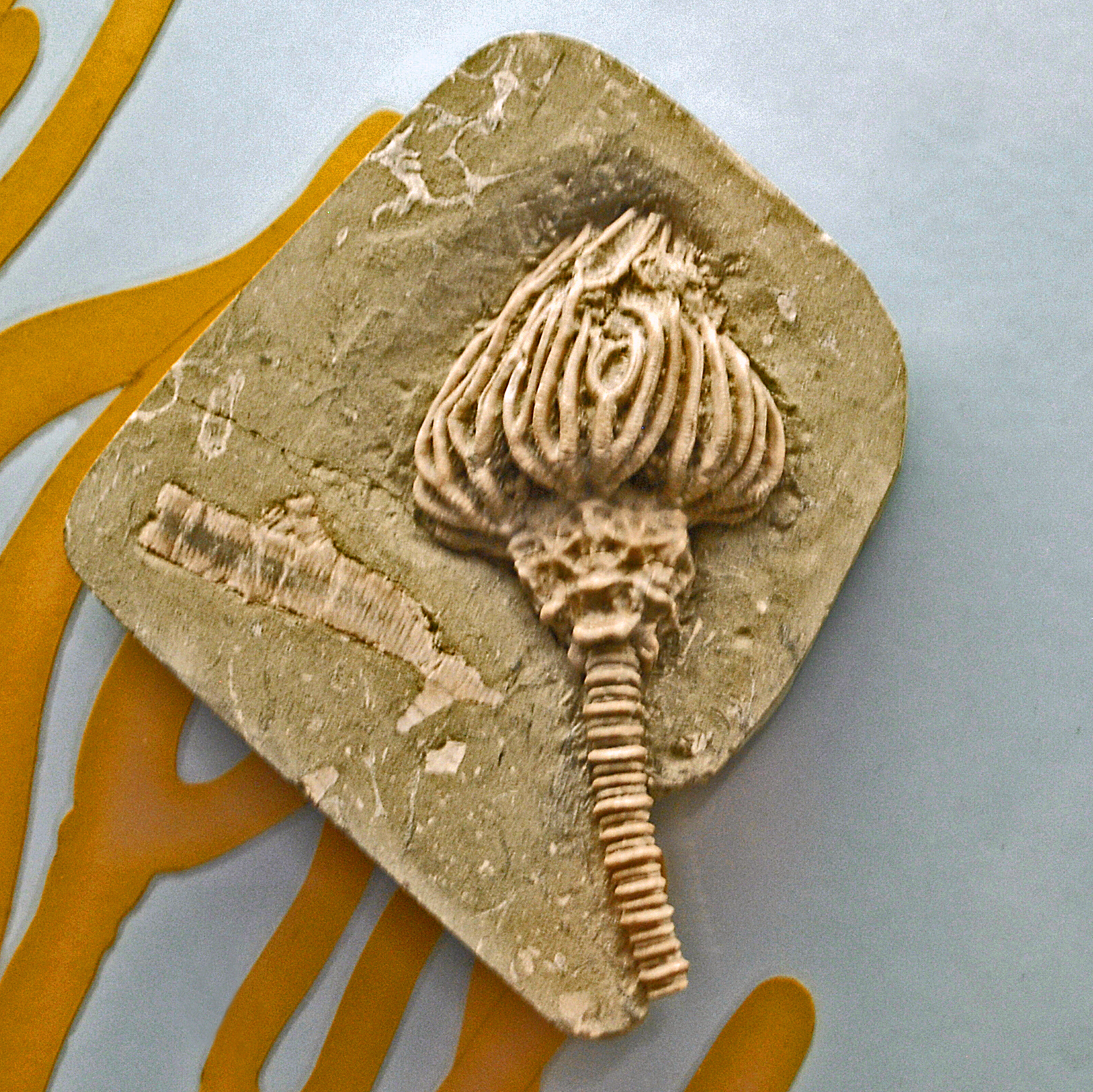
- Fossilized calyx and partial stem of the Devonian-Permian crinoid ("sea lily") Actinocrinites
  †Actinocrinites
  - †Actinocrinites gibsoni
  - †Actinocrinites grandissimus
  - †Actinocrinites lobatus – tentative report
  - †Actinocrinites lowei
- †Actinopteria
  - †Actinopteria boydi
- †Actinostroma
- †Adinocrinus
  - †Adinocrinus nodosus
- †Aemuliophyllum
  - †Aemuliophyllum exiguum
- †Aganaster
  - †Aganaster gregarius
- †Agaricocrinites
- †Agaricocrinus
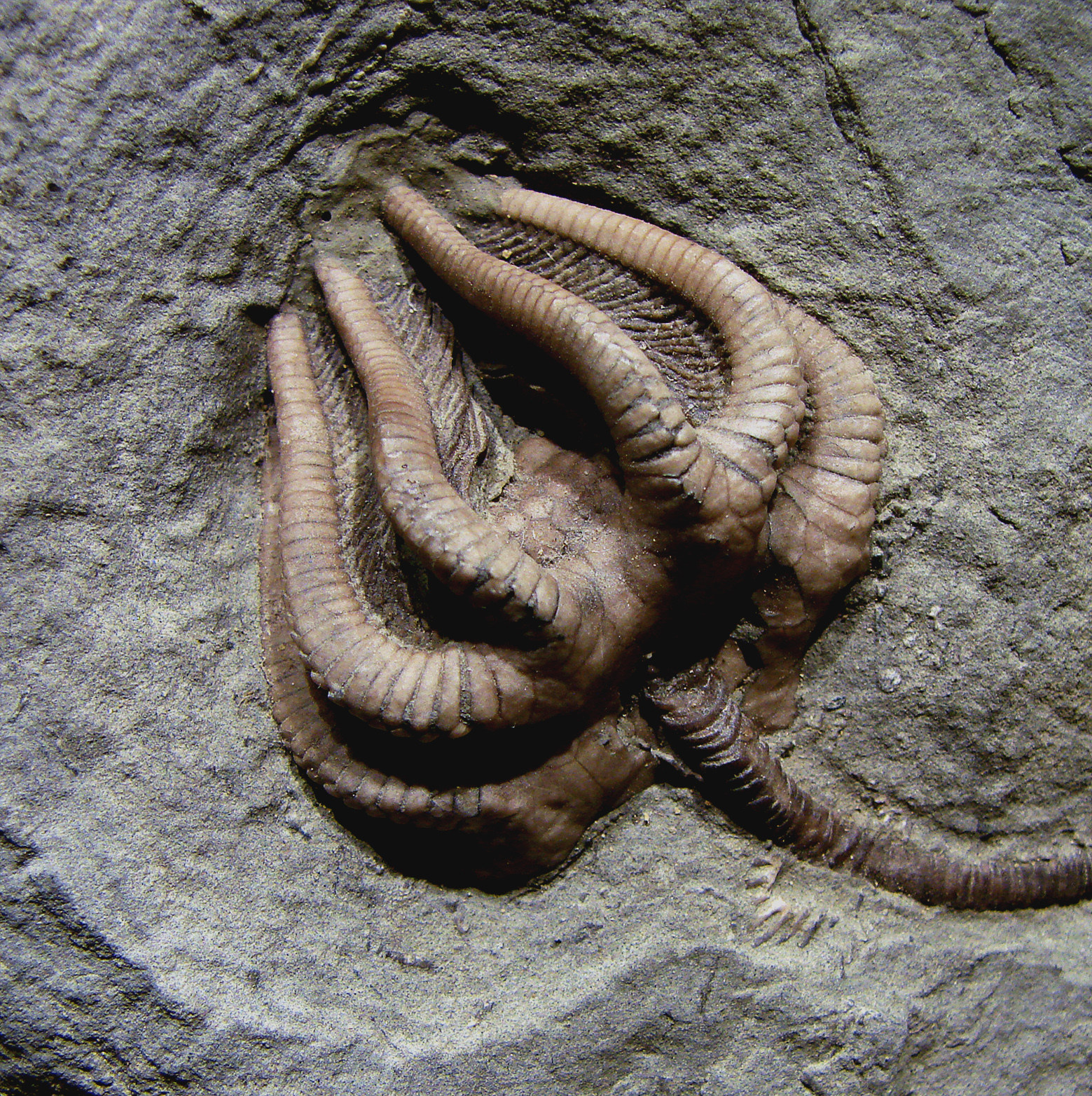
  - Fossilized calyx of the Carboniferous crinoid ("sea lily") Agaricocrinus americanus, or the mushroom crinoid
    †Agaricocrinus americanus
- †Agassizocrinus
  - †Agassizocrinus gibbosus – or unidentified comparable form
  - †Agassizocrinus laevis – or unidentified comparable form
- †Ageneracrinus
  - †Ageneracrinus basalotumidus
- †Ahrensisporites
  - †Ahrensisporites guerickei
- †Aipoceras – tentative report
- †Alaskadiscus
  - †Alaskadiscus magnus
- †Alatisporites
  - †Alatisporites trialatus
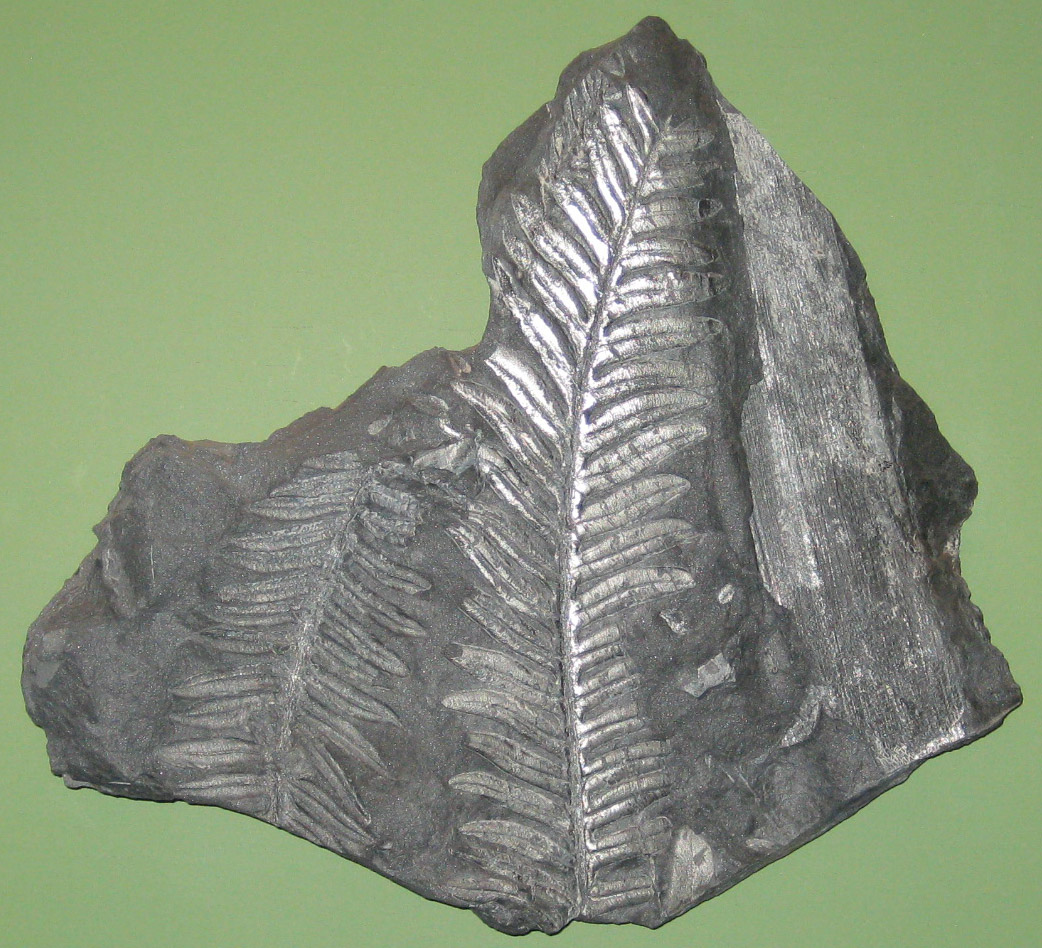
- Fossilized fronds of the Carboniferous-Early Cretaceous seed fern Alethopteris
  †Alethopteris
  - †Alethopteris davreuxi
  - †Alethopteris decurrens
  - †Alethopteris grandini
  - †Alethopteris lonchitica
  - †Alethopteris owenii
  - †Alethopteris serlii
- †Alisocrinus
  - †Alisocrinus aureatus
  - †Alisocrinus caleyi
  - †Alisocrinus laevis
- †Allocrinus
  - †Allocrinus benedicti
- †Allocystites
  - †Allocystites hammeli
- †Alloprosallocrinus
  - †Alloprosallocrinus conicus
- †Allorhynchus
  - †Allorhynchus curriei
- †Alveolites
  - †Alveolites asperus
  - †Alveolites constans
  - †Alveolites dispansus
  - †Alveolites expatiatus
  - †Alveolites goldfussi
  - †Alveolites minimus
  - †Alveolites mordax
  - †Alveolites squamosus
  - †Alveolites winchellana
- †Amaurotoma
  - †Amaurotoma leavenworthana – type locality for species
  - †Amaurotoma subangulatum – type locality for species
- †Ambocoelia
- †Ambonychia
  - †Ambonychia obesa
  - †Ambonychia robusta
  - †Ambonychia suberecta
- Ammobaculites
  - †Ammobaculites leptos
  - †Ammobaculites pyriformis
- Ammodiscus
  - †Ammodiscus longexsertus
- †Ammonellipsites
- †Ammovertella
  - †Ammovertella inclusa
- †Ampheristocystis
  - †Ampheristocystis concentricus
- †Amphipora
- †Amphipsalidocrinus – type locality for genus
  - †Amphipsalidocrinus inconsuetus
  - †Amphipsalidocrinus scissurus – type locality for species
- †Amphissites
  - †Amphissites similaris
- †Amphistrophia
- †Amphoracrinus
- †Amplexiphyllum
  - †Amplexiphyllum cruciforme
  - †Amplexiphyllum simplex – tentative report
  - †Amplexiphyllum tenue
- †Amplexizaphrentis
  - †Amplexizaphrentis spinulosus
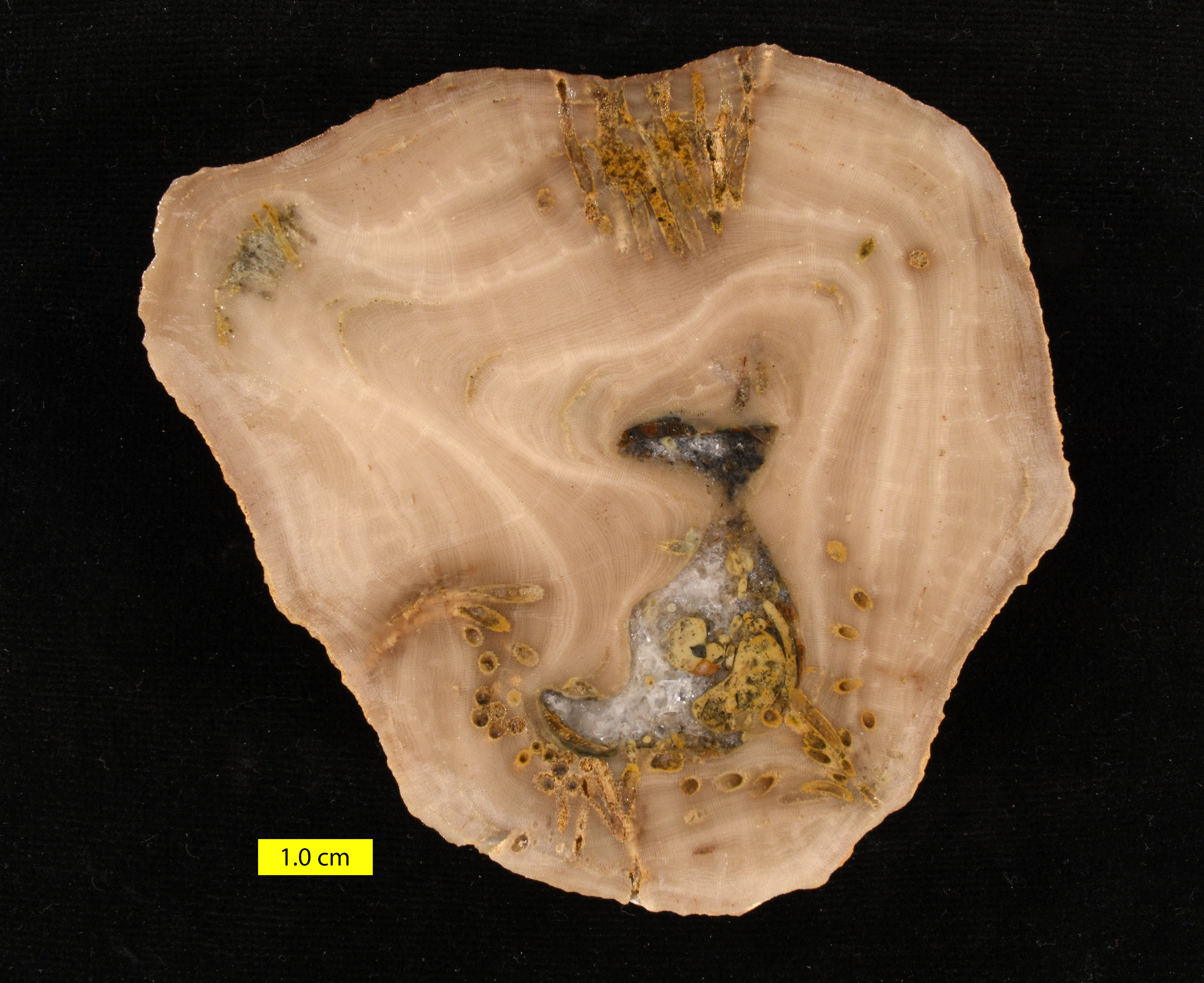
- Ordovician-Permian bryozoan Amplexopora
  †Amplexopora
  - †Amplexopora discoidea – or unidentified comparable form
- †Amplexus
- †Anachoropteris
  - †Anachoropteris involuta
- †Anapiculatisporites
  - †Anapiculatisporites baccatus
  - †Anapiculatisporites spinosus
- †Anartiocystis
- †Anastrophia
  - †Anastrophia internascens
- †Anchiopsis
- †Ancyrocrinus
  - †Ancyrocrinus bulbosus
- †Anematina
  - †Anematina proutana – type locality for species
- †Angustidontus
  - †Angustidontus seriatus
- †Angyomphalus
  - †Angyomphalus northviewensis – or unidentified related form
- †Anisocrinus
  - †Anisocrinus laurelensis
- †Anisotrypa
  - †Anisotrypa solida
- †Ankyropteris
  - †Ankyropteris brongnartii
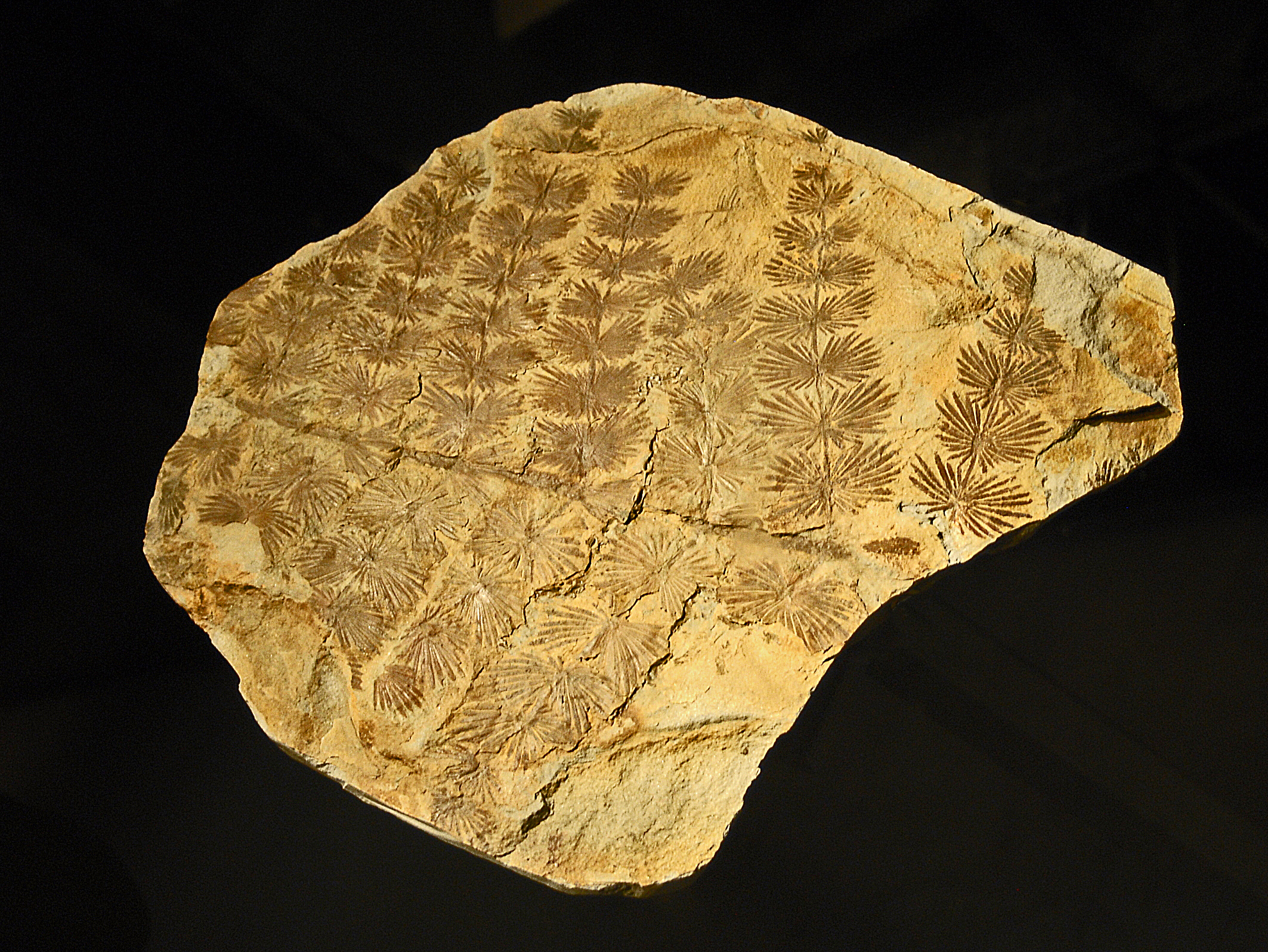
- Fossil of the Carboniferous horsetail relative Annularia
  †Annularia
  - †Annularia mucronata
  - †Annularia radiata
  - †Annularia sphenophylloides
  - †Annularia stellata
- †Anomalodonta
  - †Anomalodonta gigantea
- †Anopliopsis
  - †Anopliopsis subcarinata
- †Anthracospirifer
  - †Anthracospirifer leidyi
- †Antirhynchonella
- †Aphelakardia
  - †Aphelakardia indianense
- †Aphelecrinus
  - †Aphelecrinus oweni
  - †Aphelecrinus randolphensis
- †Aphelotoxon
- †Aphlebia
  - †Aphlebia crispa
- †Apiculatasporites
  - †Apiculatasporites latigranifer
- †Apiculatisporites
  - †Apiculatisporites abditus
  - †Apiculatisporites lappites
  - †Apiculatisporites setulosus
- †Arabellites
  - †Arabellites comis
  - †Arabellites conspicuous – or unidentified comparable form
  - †Arabellites cultriformis – or unidentified comparable form
  - †Arabellites hamiltonesis
- †Arachnophyllum
  - †Arachnophyllum striatum – or unidentified comparable form
- †Archaeopitys
  - †Archaeopitys eastmanii
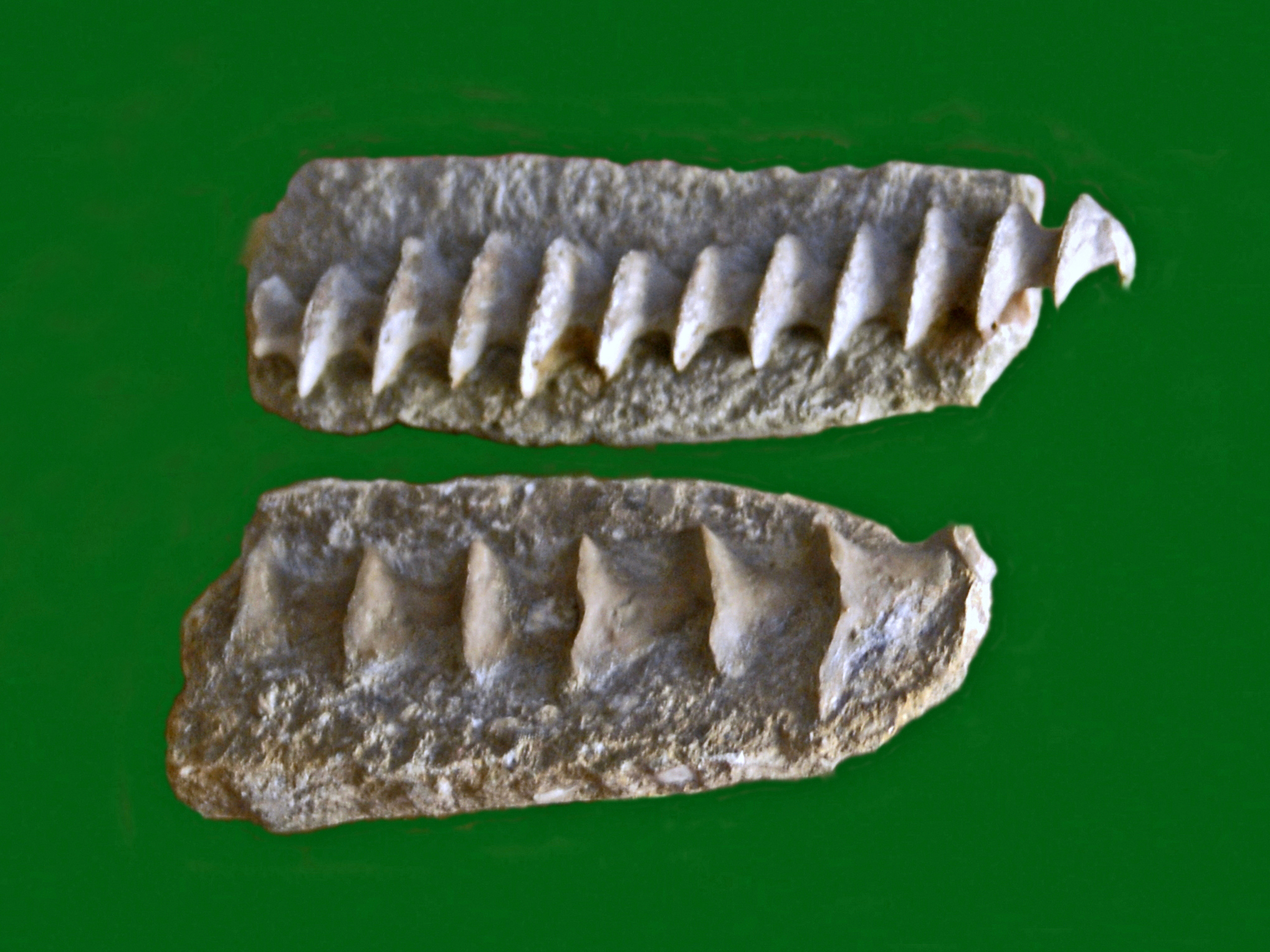
- Fossils of the Carboniferous-Permian bryozoan Archimedes
  †Archimedes
  - †Archimedes communis
  - †Archimedes compactus
  - †Archimedes distans
  - †Archimedes intermedius
  - †Archimedes invaginatus
  - †Archimedes lativolvis
  - †Archimedes macfarlani
  - †Archimedes meekanoides
  - †Archimedes meekanus
  - †Archimedes negligens – or unidentified comparable form
  - †Archimedes proutanus
  - †Archimedes swallovanus
  - †Archimedes swallowvanus
  - †Archimedes symmetricus
  - †Archimedes terebriformis
- †Archinacella
  - †Archinacella indianensis – type locality for species
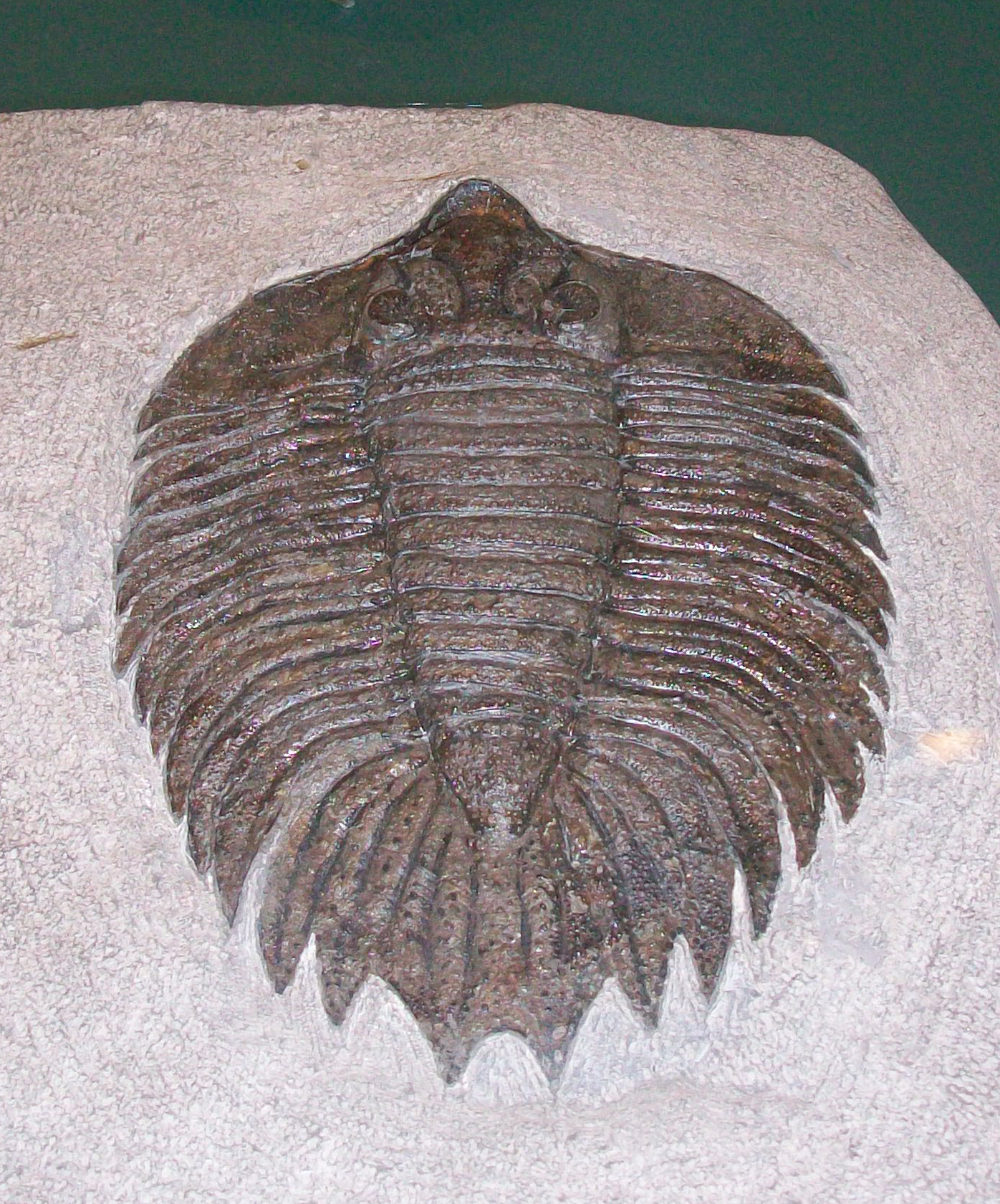
- Fossil of the Silurian trilobite Arctinurus
  †Arctinurus
  - †Arctinurus boltoni
- †Arjamannia
  - †Arjamannia aulangonensis
- †Armenoceras
  - †Armenoceras madisonense
- †Arnoldella
  - †Arnoldella minuta
- †Arthroacantha
  - †Arthroacantha carpenteri
- †Arthropitys
  - †Arthropitys communis
- †Artisia
- †Asaphocrinus
  - †Asaphocrinus minor
- †Ascoceras
  - †Ascoceras newberryi
  - †Ascoceras wabashense
- †Ascodictyon
- †Ascopora
- †Aspidiaria
- †Asterophyllites
  - †Asterophyllites equisetiformis
  - †Asterophyllites grandis
- †Asterotheca
  - †Asterotheca crenulata
  - †Asterotheca cyathea
  - †Asterotheca hemitelliodes
  - †Asterotheca miltoni
  - †Asterotheca oreopteridia
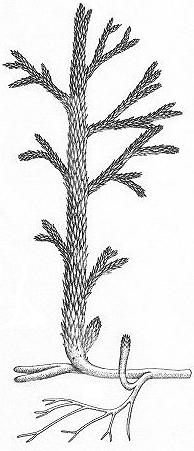
- Life restoration of the Early Devonian club moss relative Asteroxylon
  †Asteroxylon
  - †Asteroxylon setchelli
- †Astraeospongium
- †Astylospongia
  - †Astylospongia praemorsa
- †Atactoporella
- †Atelodictyon
- †Athyris
  - †Athyris fultonensis
  - †Athyris lamellosa
  - †Athyris parvirostra
  - †Athyris spiriferoides
- †Atrypa
  - †Atrypa newsomensis
  - †Atrypa parva – or unidentified comparable form
  - †Atrypa reticularis
  - †Atrypa reticularus
- †Atrypina
  - †Atrypina disparilis
- †Aulacophyllum
  - †Aulacophyllum mutabile
  - †Aulacophyllum parvum
  - †Aulacophyllum perlamellosum
  - †Aulacophyllum pinnatum
  - †Aulacophyllum sulcatum
- †Aulacotheca
- †Aulocystis
  - †Aulocystis auloporidea
  - †Aulocystis incrustans – tentative report
  - †Aulocystis jacksoni
  - †Aulocystis lucasensis
  - †Aulocystis nobilis
  - †Aulocystis procumbens – tentative report
  - †Aulocystis transitorius – type locality for species
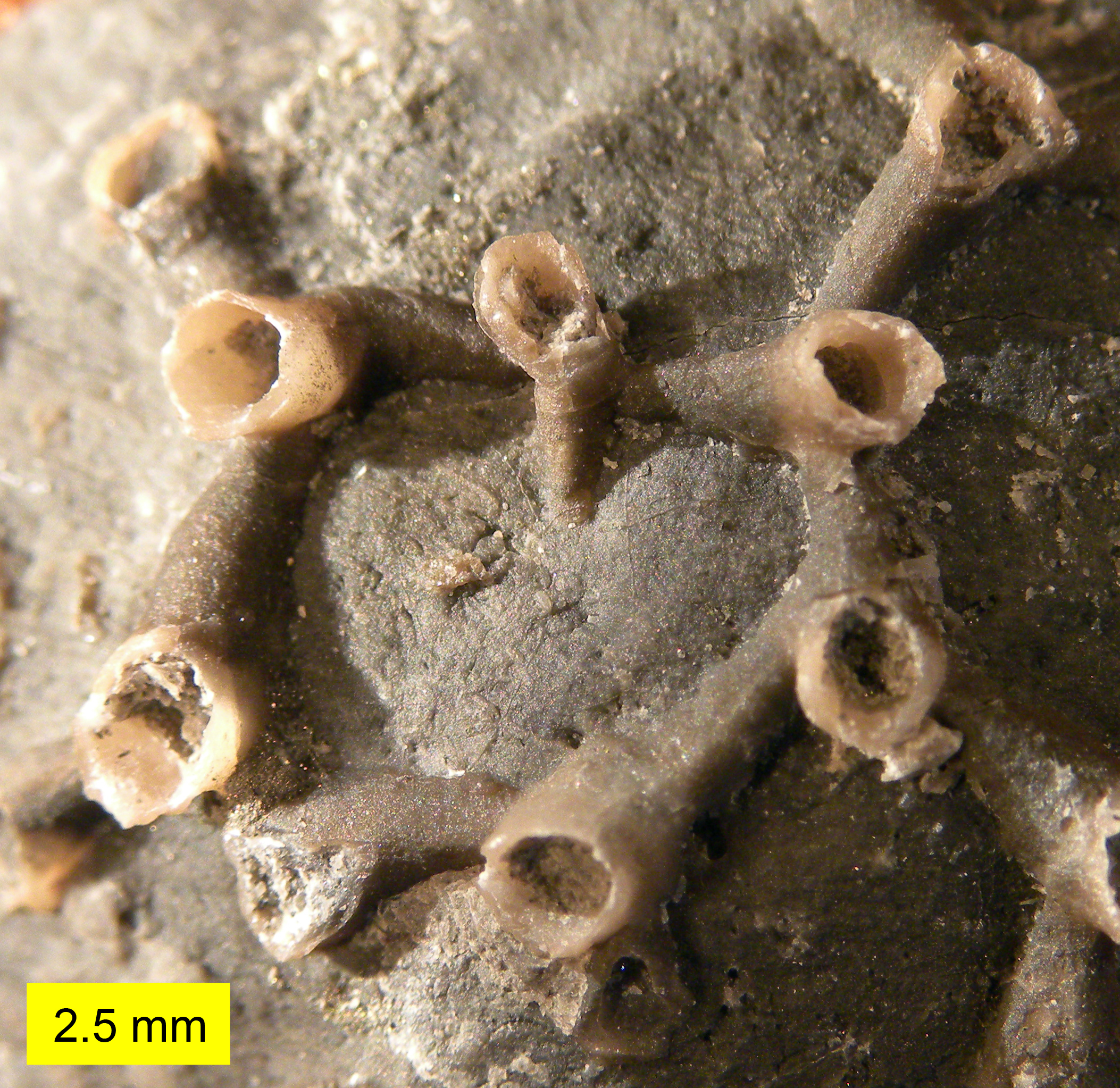
- Fossil of the Late Ordovician-Permian tabulate coral Aulopora
  †Aulopora
  - †Aulopora edithana
  - †Aulopora microbuccinata
  - †Aulopora tubiporoides
- †Auloporella
- †Aviculopecten
  - †Aviculopecten colletti
  - †Aviculopecten invalidus
  - †Aviculopecten spinuliferus
  - †Aviculopecten terminalis
- † Avonia – tentative report
- † Avonia

== B ==
- Bairdia
  - †Bairdia compacta
  - †Bairdia egorovi – or unidentified related form
  - †Bairdia kinderhookensis – or unidentified related form
- †Barroisella
  - †Barroisella campbelli
- †Barycrinus
  - †Barycrinus asperrimus
  - †Barycrinus asteriscus
  - †Barycrinus cornutus
  - †Barycrinus hoveyi
  - †Barycrinus stenobrachium
- †Baryschyr
  - †Baryschyr anosus
- †Batocrinus
  - †Batocrinus grandis
  - †Batocrinus isodactylus
- †Batostoma
  - †Batostoma prosseri
  - †Batostoma varians
- †Batostomella
- †Beatricea
  - †Beatricea undulata
- †Beecheria
  - †Beecheria illinoisense
  - †Beecheria shumardanum – tentative report
  - †Beecheria sinuata
- †Belemnospongia
  - †Belemnospongia fascicularis
  - †Belemnospongia parmula
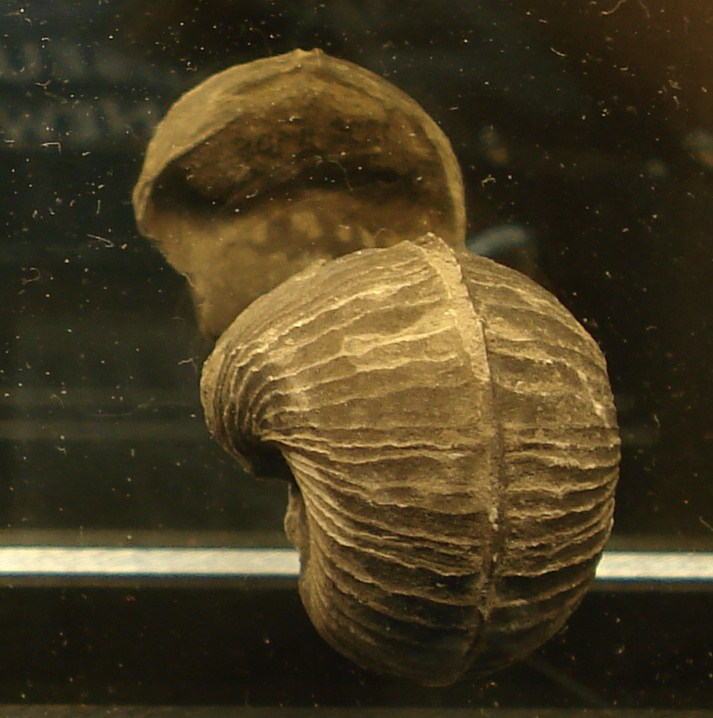
- Fossilized shell of the Silurian-Early Triassic mollusc Bellerophon
  †Bellerophon
  - †Bellerophon gibsoni – type locality for species
  - †Bellerophon jeffersonensis
  - †Bellerophon spergensis – type locality for species
- †Belodella
  - †Belodella resima – or unidentified comparable form
- †Beloitoceras
  - †Beloitoceras amoenum – type locality for species
  - †Beloitoceras bucheri
  - †Beloitoceras chapparsi
  - †Beloitoceras cumingsi
  - †Beloitoceras ohioense
  - †Beloitoceras transiens
- †Bembexia
  - †Bembexia minima
- Berenicea
- †Bethacanthus – type locality for genus
  - †Bethacanthus insolitus – type locality for species
- †Bethanyphyllum
  - †Bethanyphyllum arctifossa
  - †Bethanyphyllum depresstum
  - †Bethanyphyllum pocillum
  - †Bethanyphyllum robustum
  - †Bethanyphyllum validum
  - †Bethanyphyllum vesiculatum
- †Beyrichoceras
- †Bigalea
  - †Bigalea ohioensis – type locality for species
- †Billingsastrea
  - †Billingsastrea yandelli
- †Blothrophyllum
  - †Blothrophyllum bellicinctum
  - †Blothrophyllum corium
  - †Blothrophyllum greeni – tentative report
  - †Blothrophyllum romingeri – type locality for species
  - †Blothrophyllum sinuosum
  - †Blothrophyllum tripinnatum
  - †Blothrophyllum trisulcatum
  - †Blothrophyllum zaphrentiforme
- †Blountia – tentative report
- †Bordonia
  - †Bordonia knappi
- †Bothrodendron
  - †Bothrodendron minutifolium
- †Botryocrinus
  - †Botryocrinus nucleus
  - †Botryocrinus polyxo
- †Brachythyris
  - †Brachythyris fernglenensis – or unidentified related form
  - †Brachythyris suborbicularis
- †Brahmacrinus
  - †Brahmacrinus elongatus
- †Brittsia
  - †Brittsia problematica
- †Brockocystis
  - †Brockocystis nodosaria
- †Bucania
  - †Bucania simulatrix – type locality for species
- †Bucanophyllum
  - †Bucanophyllum ohioense
- †Bucanopsis
- †Bulimorpha
  - †Bulimorpha bulimiformis – type locality for species
  - †Bulimorpha elongata – type locality for species
- †Bullimorpha
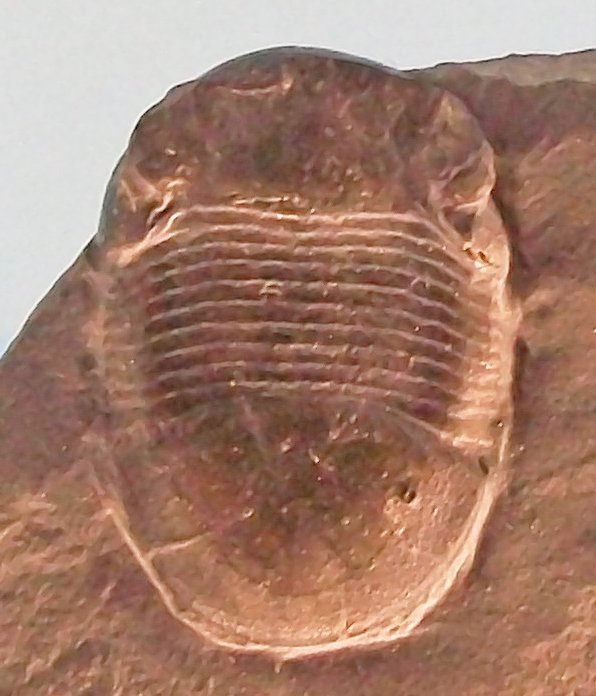
- Fossil of the Early Ordovician-Silurian trilobite Bumastus
  †Bumastus
  - †Bumastus armatus – or unidentified comparable form
  - †Bumastus insignis
  - †Bumastus ioxus
  - †Bumastus niagarense – or unidentified comparable form
- †Bynumina
- †Byssonychia
  - †Byssonychia richmondensis
- †Bythocyproidea
- †Bythopora
  - †Bythopora delicatula
  - †Bythopora gracilis
  - †Bythopora meeki
  - †Bythopora striata

== C ==
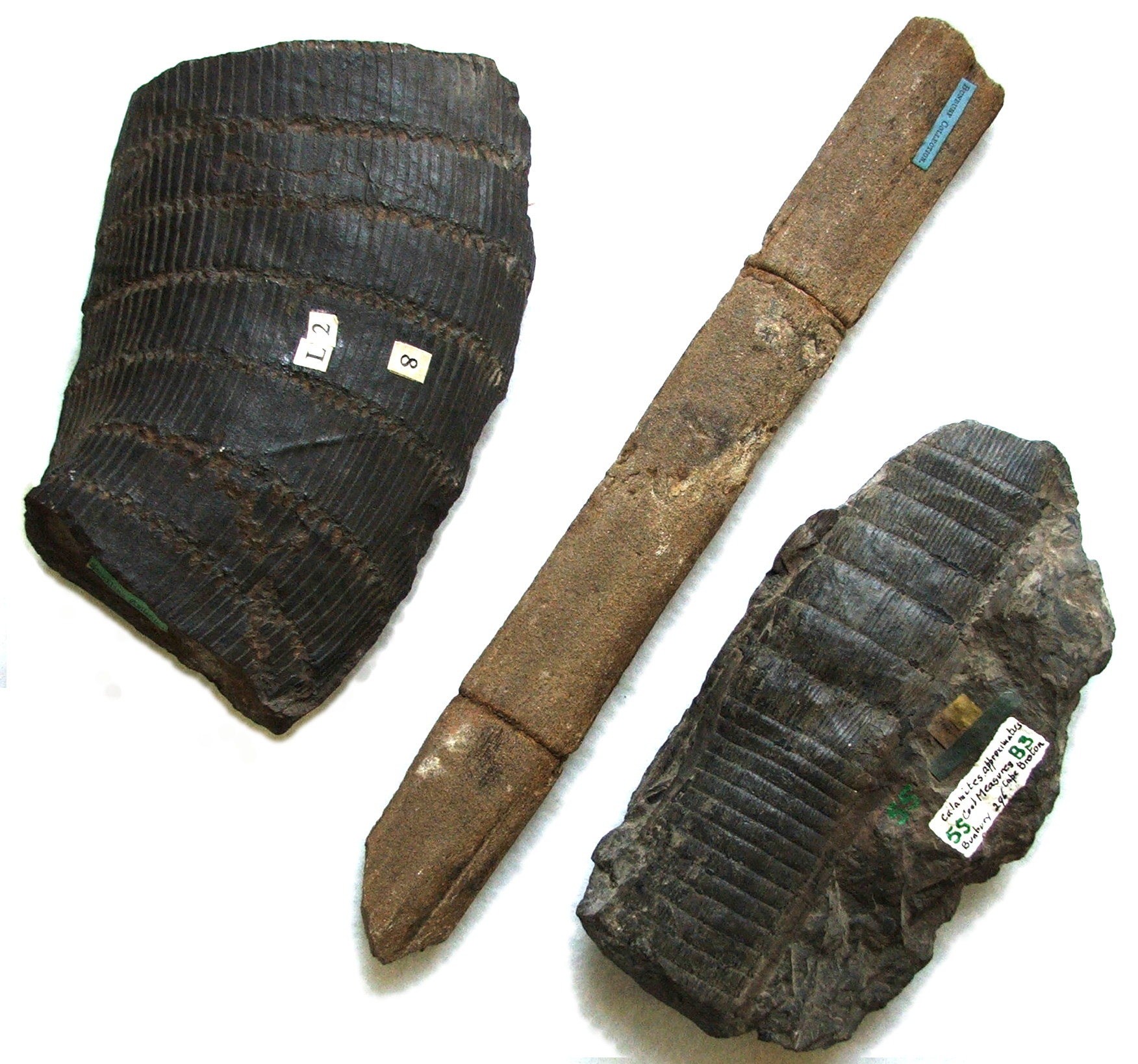
- Fossilized stems from the Carboniferous-Permian horsetail relative Calamites
  †Calamites
  - †Calamites cruciatus
  - †Calamites suckowii
- †Calamodendron
  - †Calamodendron americanum
- †Calamospora
  - †Calamospora breviradiata
  - †Calamospora flava
  - †Calamospora hartungiana
  - †Calamospora liquida
  - †Calamospora mutabilis
  - †Calamospora straminea
- †Calamostachys
  - †Calamostachys paniculata – tentative report
  - †Calamostachys superba
  - †Calamostachys tuberculata
- †Calceocrinus
- †Calliocrinus
  - †Calliocrinus beachleri
  - †Calliocrinus cornutus
- †Callipleura
  - †Callipleura nobilis
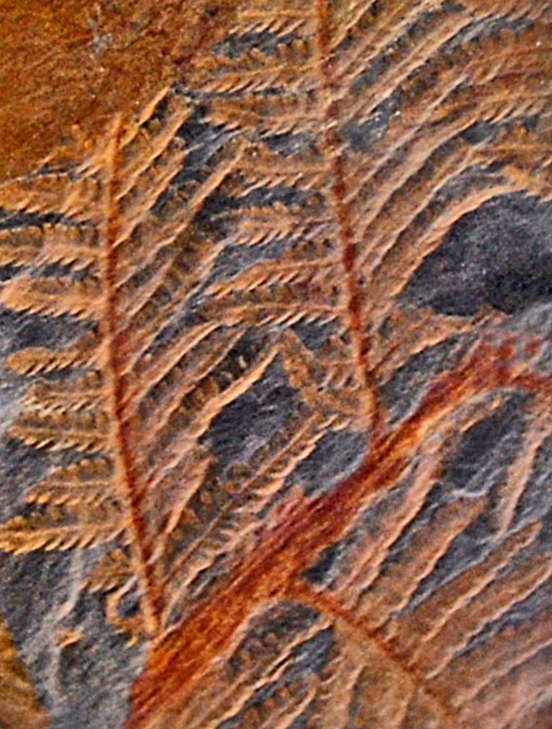
- Fossilized fronds of the Carboniferous seed fern Callipteridium
  †Callipteridium
  - †Callipteridium sullivanti
- †Callistophyton
  - †Callistophyton boysettii
- †Callixylon
  - †Callixylon brownii
  - †Callixylon newberryi
- †Callocystites
  - †Callocystites brevis
- †Calocephalites
- †Calostylis
  - †Calostylis trigemma – tentative report
- †Calymene
  - †Calymene breviceps
  - †Calymene celebra
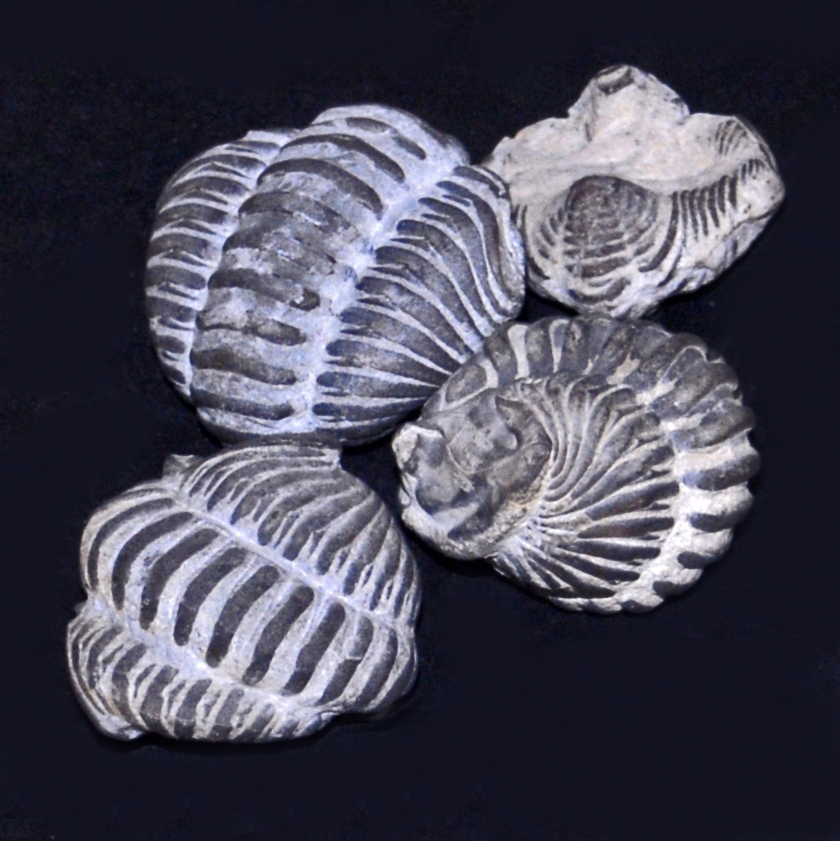
  - Fossils in enrolled posture of the Silurian trilobite Calymene niagarensis
    †Calymene niagarensis
- †Calyptactis
  - †Calyptactis confragosus
- †Camarotoechia
  - †Camarotoechia gregaria – tentative report
  - †Camarotoechia horsfordi
  - †Camarotoechia mutata
  - †Camarotoechia neglecta – or unidentified comparable form
  - †Camarotoechia pisa
  - †Camarotoechia tethys
- †Camptocrinus
  - †Camptocrinus plenicirrus
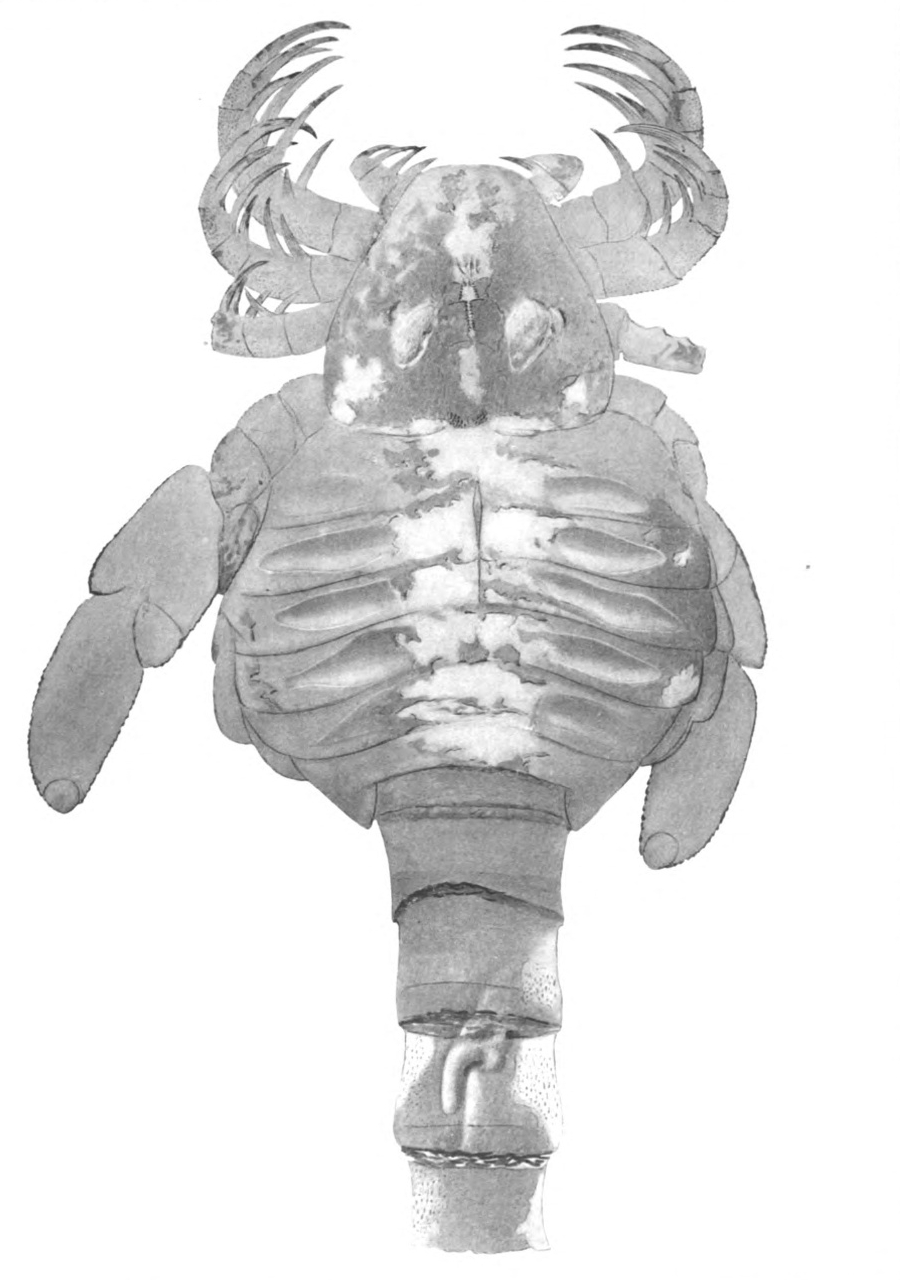
- Fossil of the Silurian eurypterid ("sea scorpion") Carcinosoma
  †Carcinosoma
  - †Carcinosoma newlini
- †Cardiocarpon
  - †Cardiocarpon annulatum
  - †Cardiocarpon dilatatus
  - †Cardiocarpon ingens – tentative report
  - †Cardiocarpon latealatum
- †Carneyella
- †Carpocrinus
  - †Carpocrinus sculptus
- †Carpomanon
- †Caryocrinites
  - †Caryocrinites bulbulus
  - †Caryocrinites ellipticus
  - †Caryocrinites indianensis
  - †Caryocrinites laurelensis
  - †Caryocrinites sphaeroidalis
  - †Caryocrinites stellatus
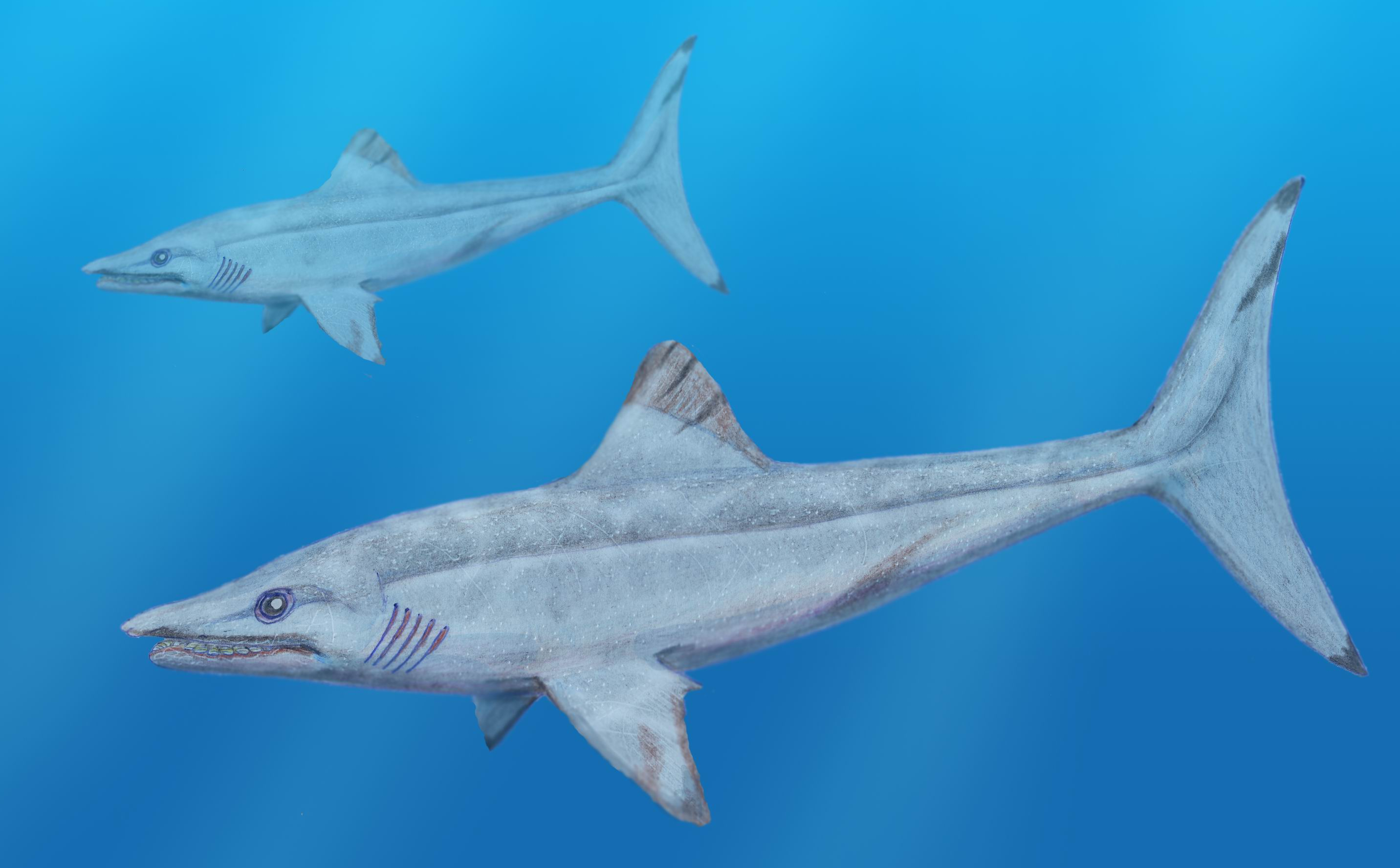
- Life restoration of the Carboniferous Chimaera relative Caseodus
  †Caseodus
  - †Caseodus eatoni – type locality for species
- †Catazyga
  - †Catazyga headi
- †Catillocrinus
  - †Catillocrinus turbinatus
  - †Catillocrinus wachsmuthi
- †Cavellina
- †Cayrocrinites
- †Cayugaea
  - †Cayugaea subcylindrica
- †Cayugea
- †Centronella
  - †Centronella campbelli
  - †Centronella impressa
  - †Centronella navicella
- †Ceramopora
  - †Ceramopora imbricata
  - †Ceramopora vesicularis
- †Ceramoporella
  - †Ceramoporella ohioensis
- †Ceraurinus
  - †Ceraurinus icarus
- †Ceraurus
- †Cervifurca – type locality for genus
  - †Cervifurca nasuta – type locality for species
- †Chancelloria
- †Charactoceras
  - †Charactoceras baeri
  - †Charactoceras faberi
- †Cheilocephalus
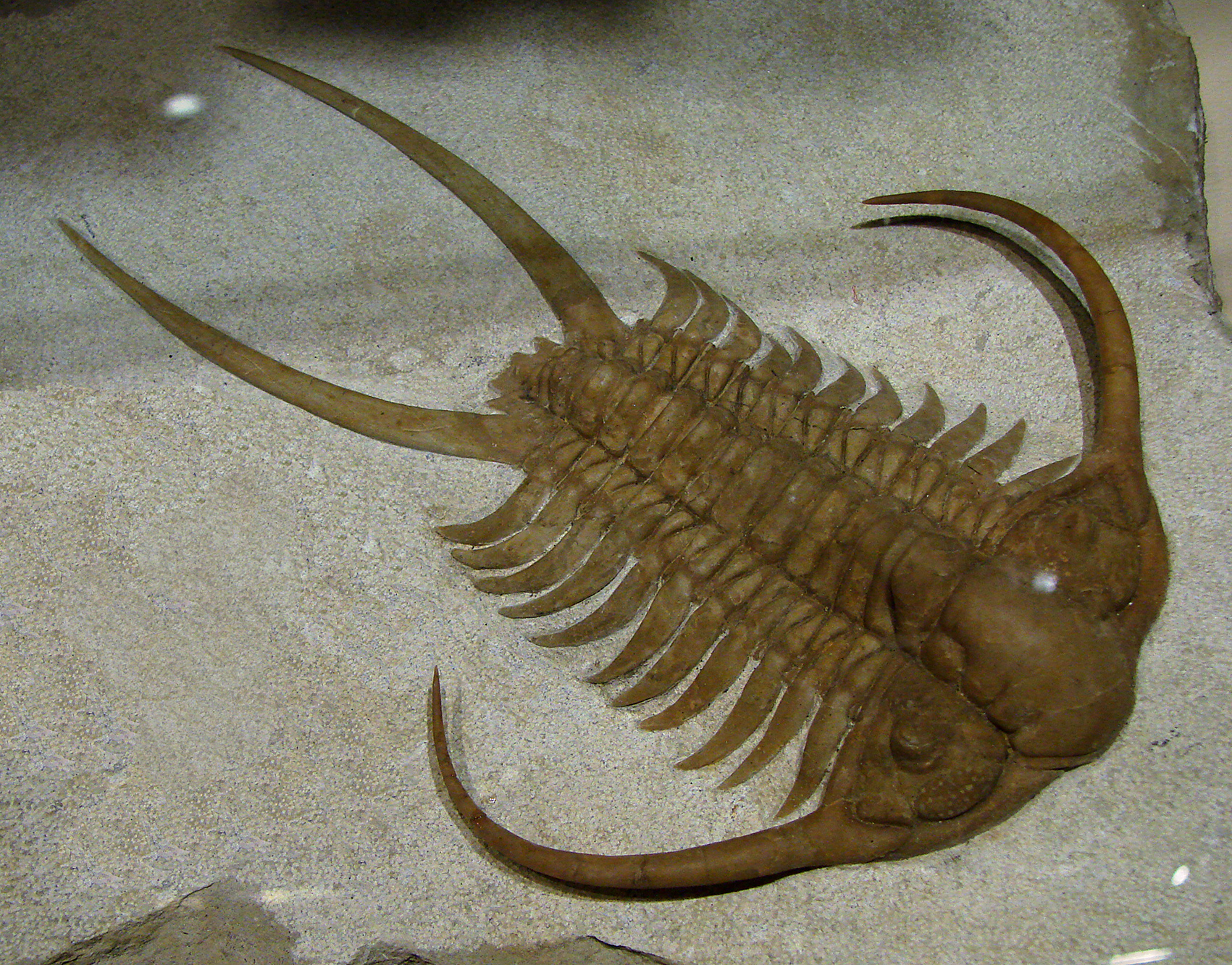
- Fossil of the Cambrian-Middle Devonian trilobite Cheirurus
  †Cheirurus
  - †Cheirurus dilatatus
- †Chilotrypa
  - †Chilotrypa ostiolata
- †Chomatodus
- †Chondrites
- †Chonetes
  - †Chonetes geniculatus
  - †Chonetes yandellanus
- †Chonophyllum
  - †Chonophyllum nanum
- †Chonostegites
  - †Chonostegites clappi
  - †Chonostegites tabulatus
- †Cincinnaticrinus
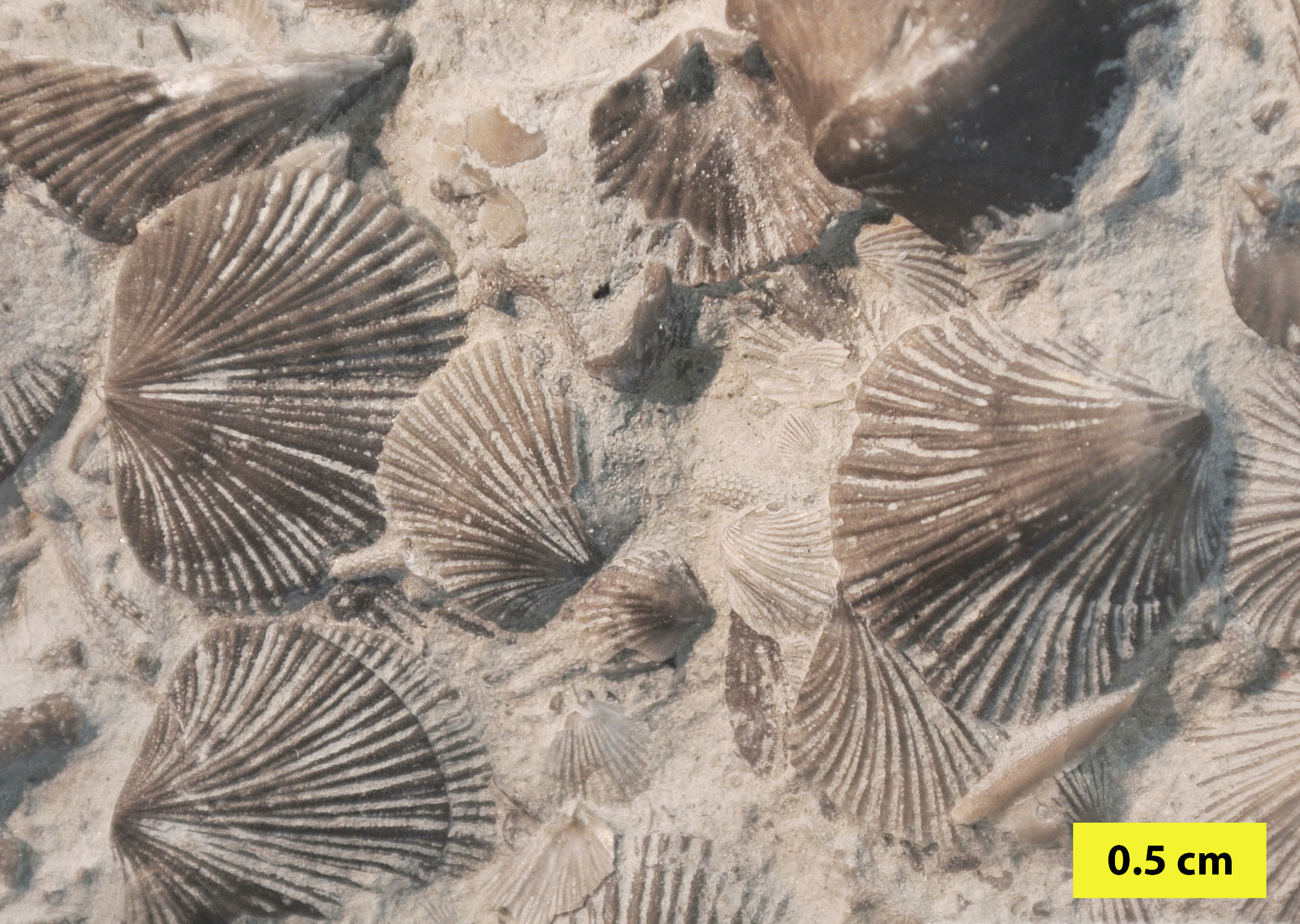
- Assemblage of fossilized shells of the Ordovician brachiopod Cincinnetina
  †Cincinnetina
  - †Cincinnetina meeki
  - †Cincinnetina multisecta
- †Cingularia
- †Cingulizonates
  - †Cingulizonates loricatus
- †Cirratriradites
  - †Cirratriradites annulatus
  - †Cirratriradites annuliformis
- †Cladochonus
  - †Cladochonus beecheri
  - †Cladochonus crassus
  - †Cladochonus longi
- †Cladopora
  - †Cladopora acupicta
  - †Cladopora bifurca
  - †Cladopora gracilis – tentative report
  - †Cladopora gulielmi
  - †Cladopora imbricata – tentative report
  - †Cladopora robusta – tentative report
  - †Cladopora roemeri
- †Cladoxylon
- †Clathrodictyon
- †Clathrospira
  - †Clathrospira subconica
- †Cleiodictya
  - †Cleiodictya gloriosa
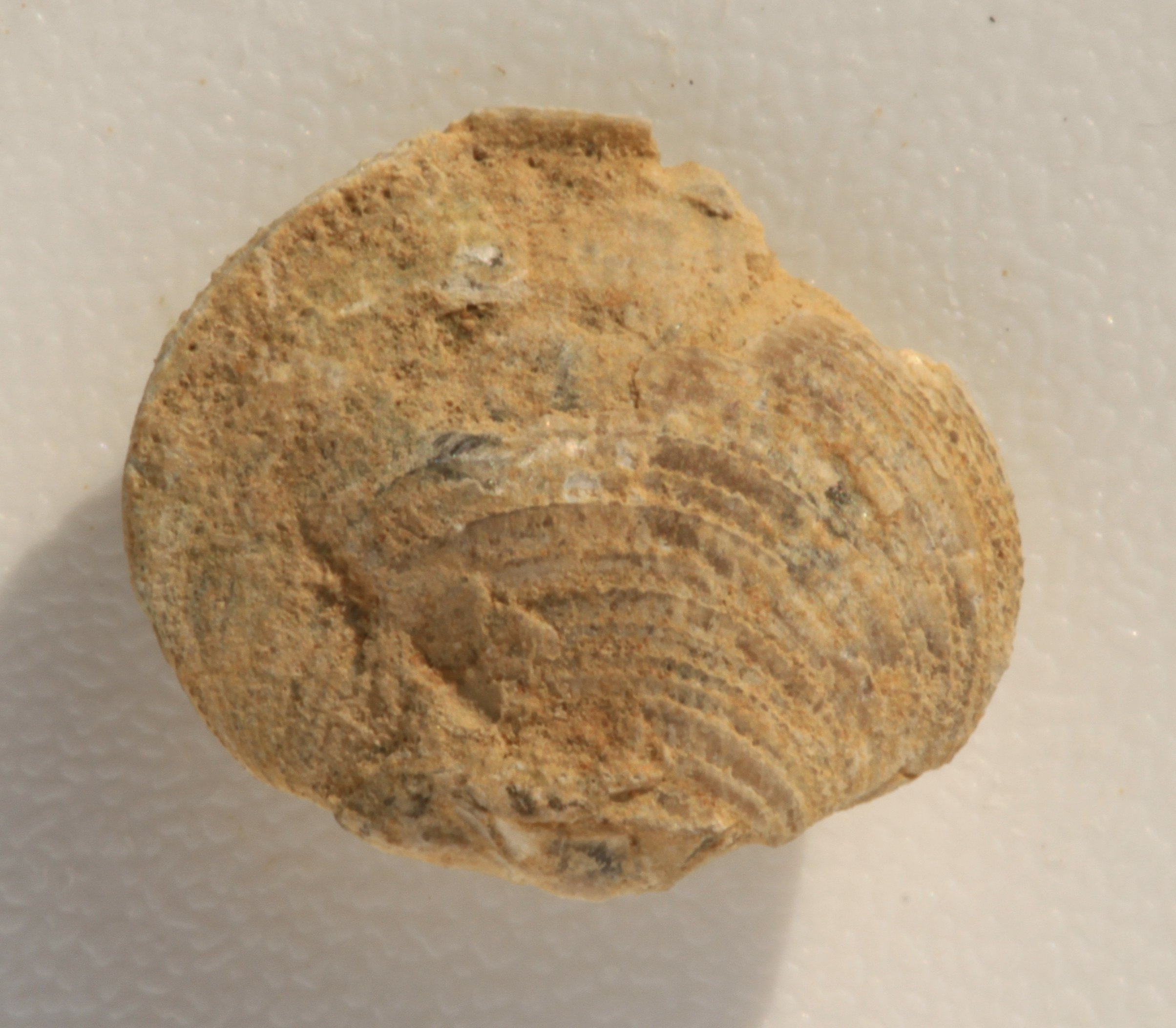
- Fossilized shell of the Middle Devonian-Permian brachiopod Cleiothyridina
  †Cleiothyridina
  - †Cleiothyridina hirsuta
  - †Cleiothyridina obmaxima
  - †Cleiothyridina parvirostra
  - †Cleiothyridina pravirostra
  - †Cleiothyridina sublamellosa
- †Cleodictya
- †Clepsidropsis
  - †Clepsidropsis titan
- †Clepsydropsis
  - †Clepsydropsis bertrandi
  - †Clepsydropsis chaneyi
- †Clinopistha
  - †Clinopistha exacutus
- †Cliotrypa
- †Clorinda – tentative report
- †Codonotheca
  - †Codonotheca caduca
- †Coelocerododontus
  - †Coelocerododontus biconvexus – or unidentified comparable form
- †Coelochilina
  - †Coelochilina striatomarginata
- †Coeloclema
- †Coelospira
- †Coenites
  - †Coenites brownsportensis
  - †Coenites cryptodens – or unidentified comparable form
  - †Coenites laqueata – or unidentified comparable form
  - †Coenites rectilineatus
- †Coleophyllum
  - †Coleophyllum romingeri
- †Columnaria
  - †Columnaria alveolata
  - †Columnaria vacua
- †Complexisporites
  - †Complexisporites chalonerii
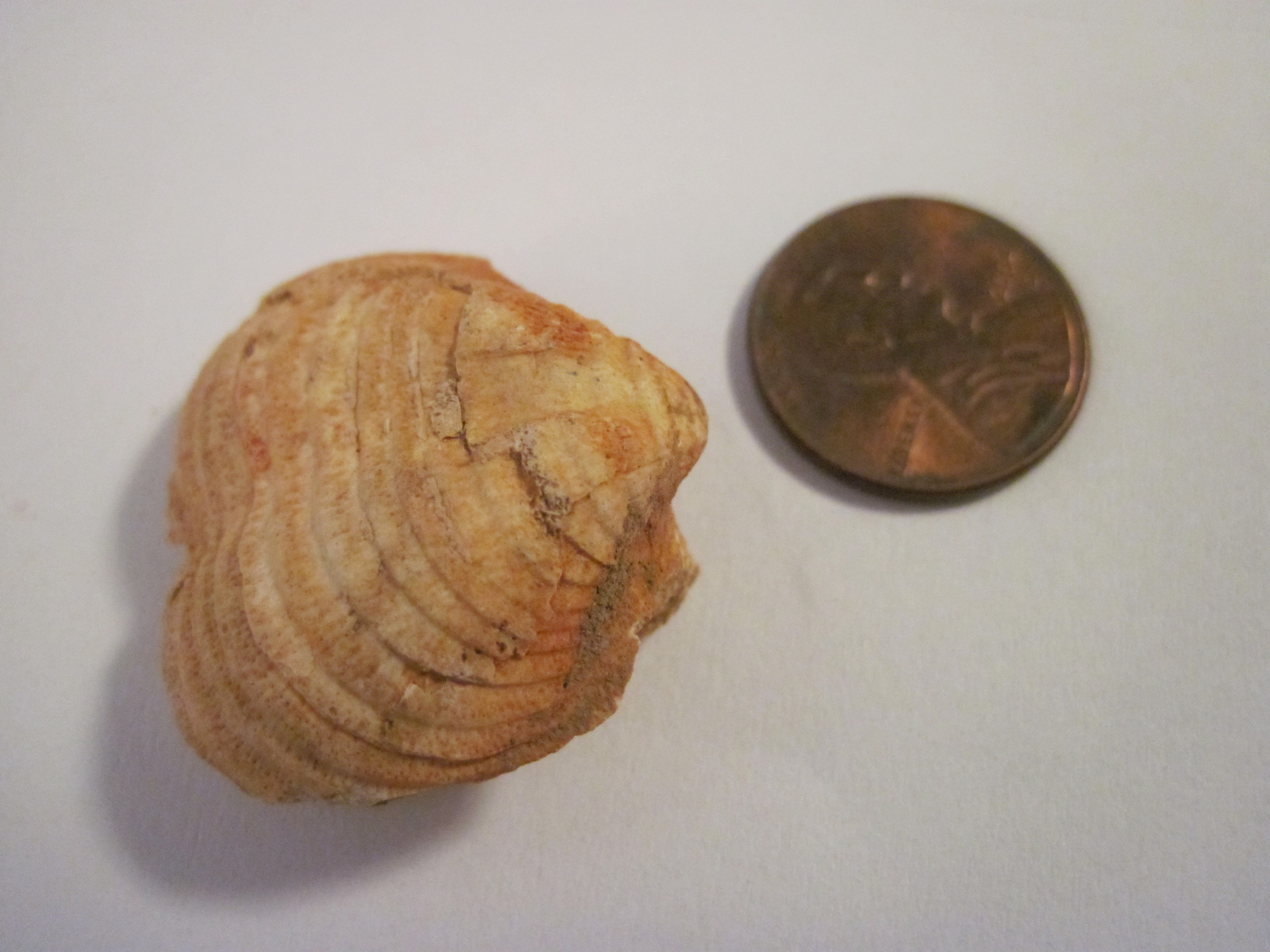
- Fossilized shell of the Late Devonian-Permian brachiopod Composita
  †Composita
  - †Composita globosa
  - †Composita subquadrata
  - †Composita sulcata
  - †Composita trinuclea
- †Compressiphyllum
  - †Compressiphyllum davisana
- †Concavicaris
- †Conchidium
  - †Conchidium biolularis – or unidentified comparable form
  - †Conchidium exporrecta
  - †Conchidium laqueatum
  - †Conchidium littoni – or unidentified comparable form
- †Conocardium
  - †Conocardium richmondense – type locality for species
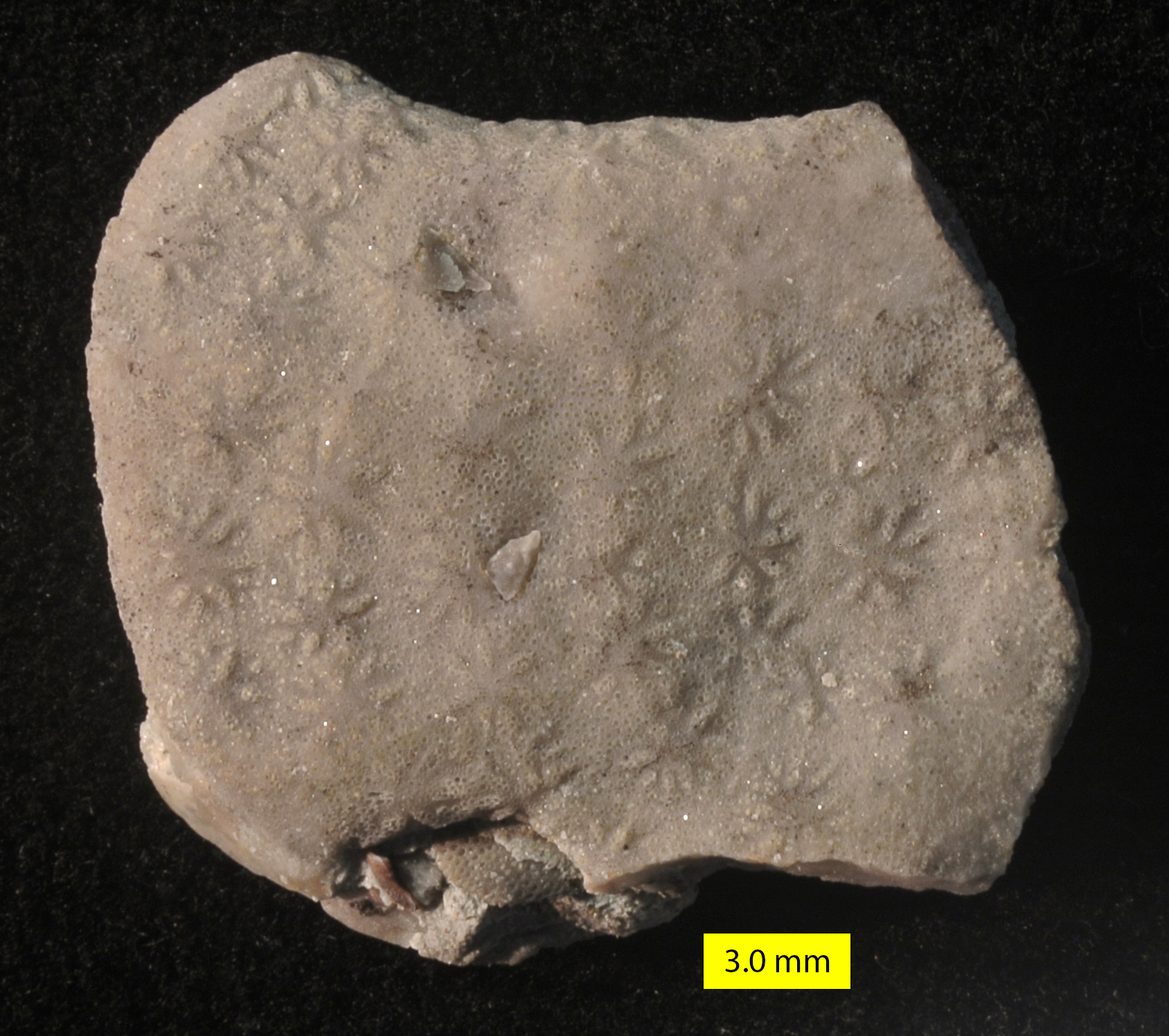
- Fossil of the Ordovician bryozoan Constellaria
  †Constellaria
  - †Constellaria limitaris
  - †Constellaria polystomella
- †Conularia
  - †Conularia formosa
- †Convolutipora
  - †Convolutipora florida
- †Convolutispora
  - †Convolutispora fromensis
- †Coolinia
  - †Coolinia subplana
- †Cordaianthus
  - †Cordaianthus gemmifer
- †Cordaicarpon – tentative report
- †Cordaites
  - †Cordaites borassifolius
  - †Cordaites crassinervis
  - †Cordaites principalis
- †Cornulitella
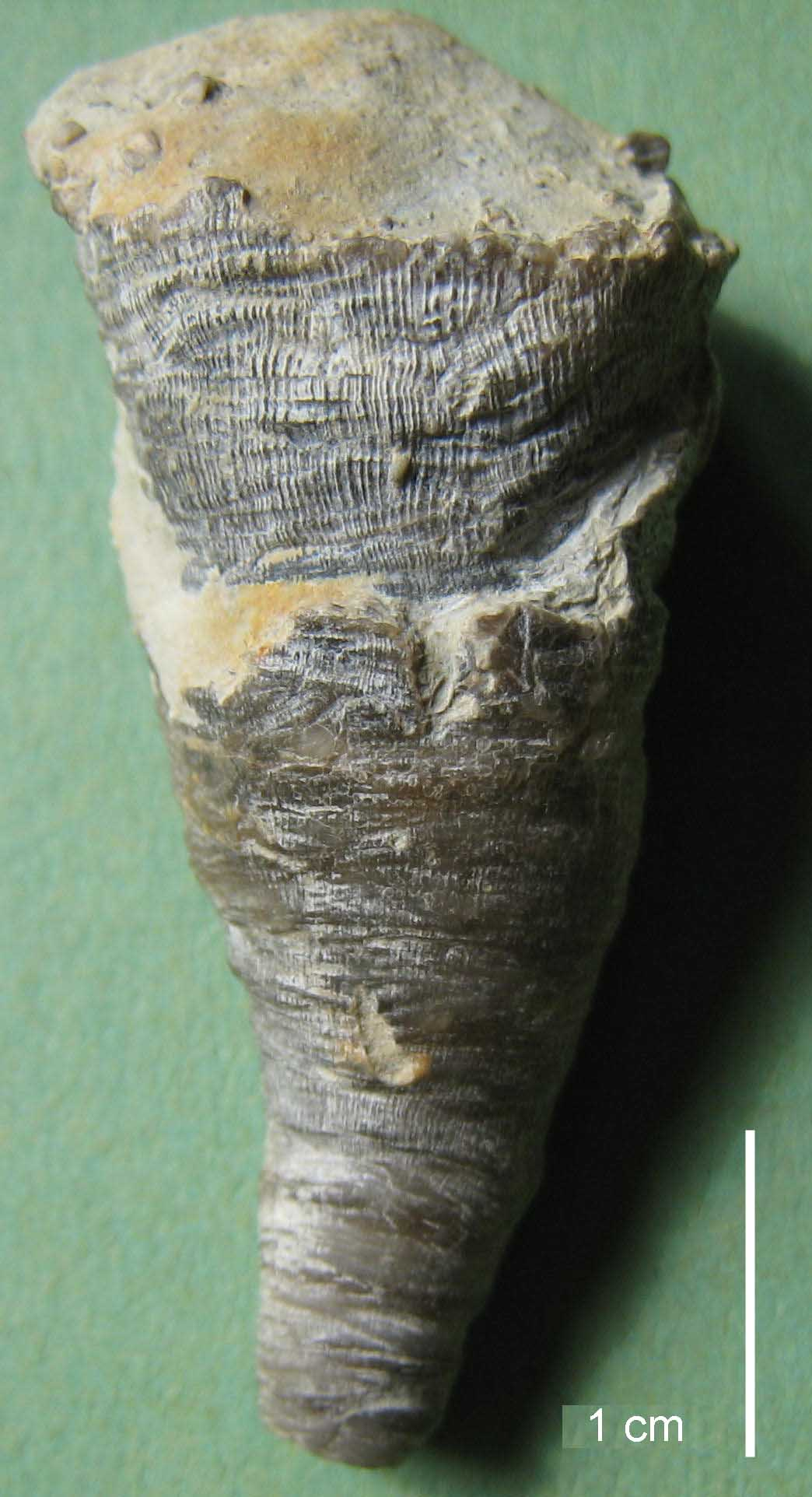
- Fossil of the Middle Ordovician-Carboniferous horn coral Cornulites
  †Cornulites
  - †Cornulites formosa
  - †Cornulites proprius
- Cornuspira
  - †Cornuspira semiconstrictus
- †Coronura
  - †Coronura aspectans
- †Corynotrypa
  - †Corynotrypa dissimilis
- †Costalocrinus
  - †Costalocrinus rex
- †Costatulites
  - †Costatulites richmondensis
- †Cranaena
  - †Cranaena lincklaeni
  - †Cranaena romingeri
  - †Cranaena subcircularis
  - †Cranaena sulcata
  - †Cranaena sullivanti
- †Crania
  - †Crania chesterensis
- †Craniops
  - †Craniops hamiltonae
  - †Craniops hamiltoniae
- †Crassispora
  - †Crassispora kosankei
  - †Crassispora plicata
- †Craterophyllum
  - †Craterophyllum latiradium – tentative report
  - †Craterophyllum magnificum
- †Cribanocrinus
  - †Cribanocrinus coxanus
- †Cribroconcha – tentative report
- †Cristatisporites
  - †Cristatisporites alpernii
- †Crossotheca
  - †Crossotheca sagittata
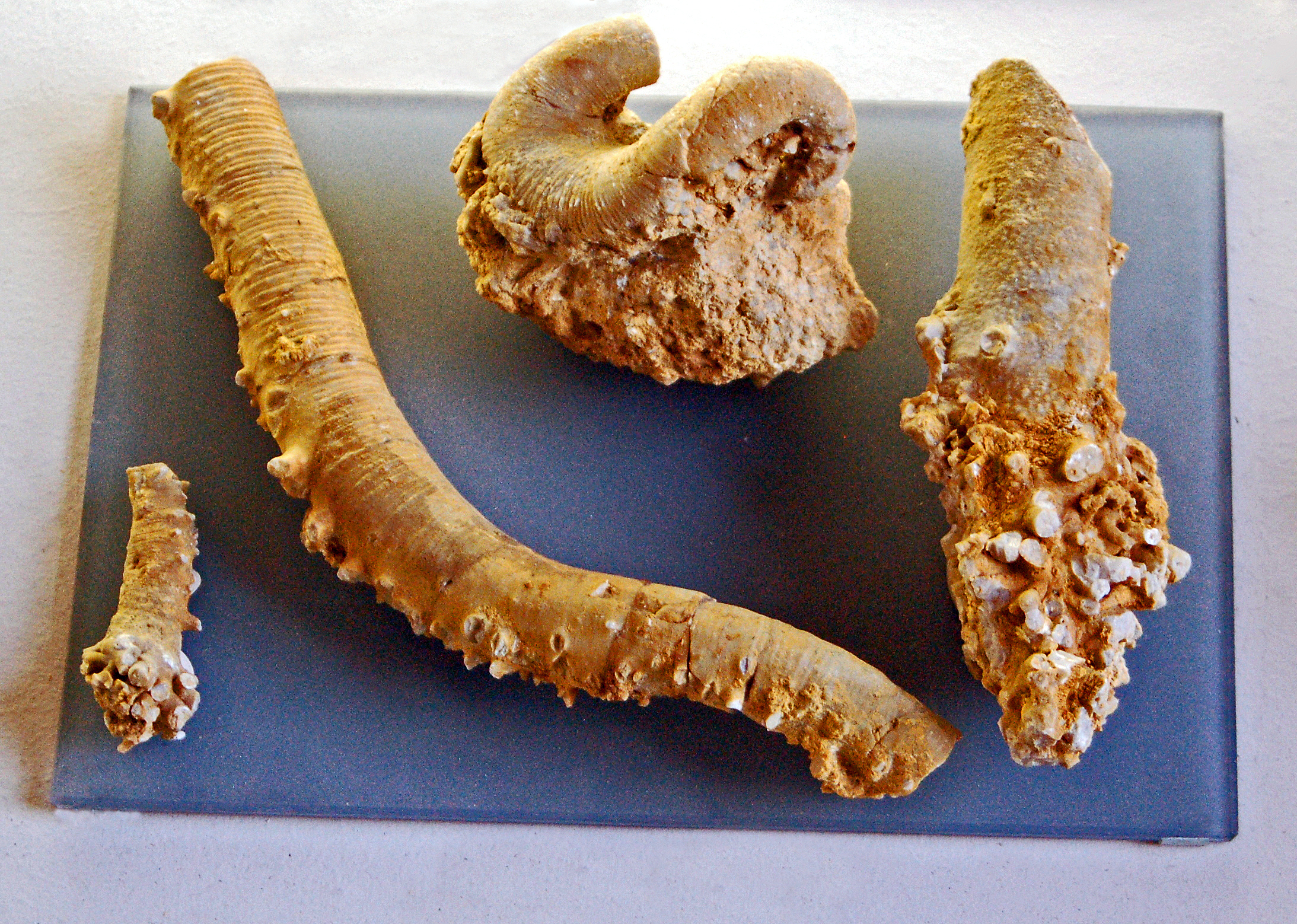
- Fossilized stem segments of the Silurian crinoid ("sea lily") Crotalocrinites
  †Crotalocrinites
- †Crotalocrinus
  - †Crotalocrinus cora
- †Crurithyris
  - †Crurithyris parva
- †Cryptonella
  - †Cryptonella lens
  - †Cryptonella ovalis
- †Crytobairdia
  - †Crytobairdia compacta
- †Ctenocrinus
  - †Ctenocrinus granulosus
- †Ctenodonta
  - †Ctenodonta iphegenia
  - †Ctenodonta madisonensis
- †Cuffeyella
  - †Cuffeyella arachnoidea
- †Cunctocrinus
  - †Cunctocrinus fortunatus
- †Cuneamya
  - †Cuneamya miamiensis
- †Cupularostrum
  - †Cupularostrum exima
- †Cupulocorona
  - †Cupulocorona gemmiformis
  - †Cupulocorona hammeli
  - †Cupulocorona osgoodensis
- †Cupulocrinus
  - †Cupulocrinus gemmiformis
- †Cyathaxonia
  - †Cyathaxonia cyndon
  - †Cyathaxonia tantilla
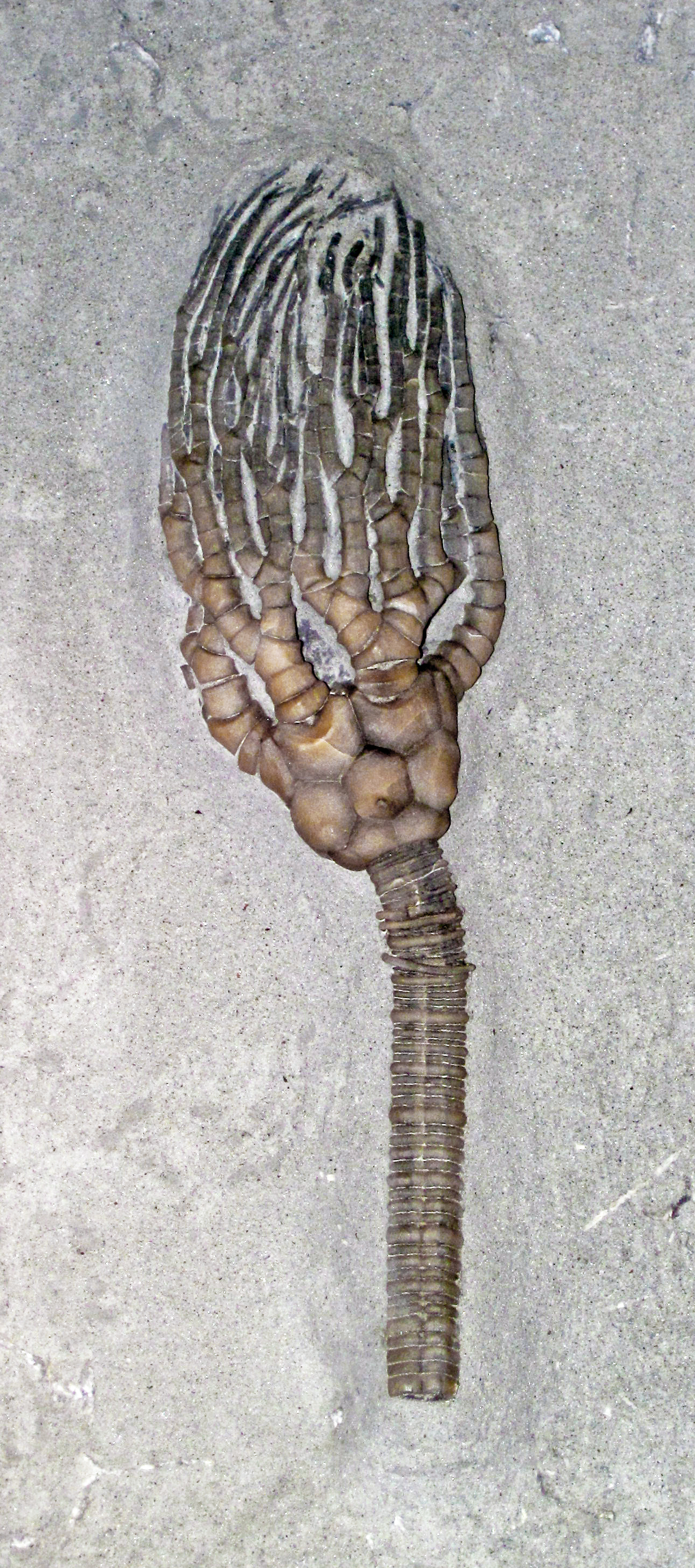
- Fossilized calyx and partial stem of the Silurian-Permian crinoid ("sea lily") Cyathocrinites
  †Cyathocrinites
  - †Cyathocrinites glenni – or unidentified comparable form
  - †Cyathocrinites multibrachiatus
  - †Cyathocrinites parvibrachiatus
  - †Cyathocrinites pauli
  - †Cyathocrinites sanduskyensis
  - †Cyathocrinites striatissimus
  - †Cyathocrinites wilsoni
- †Cyathophyllum – tentative report
- †Cycloconcha
  - †Cycloconcha milleri
- †Cyclocyclopa
- †Cyclogranisporites
  - †Cyclogranisporites aureus
  - †Cyclogranisporites breviradiatus
  - †Cyclogranisporites microgranus
  - †Cyclogranisporites minutus
  - †Cyclogranisporites obliquus
  - †Cyclogranisporites orbicularis
  - †Cyclogranisporites staplini
- †Cycloholcus
- †Cyclonema
  - †Cyclonema bilix
  - †Cyclonema daytonensis
  - †Cyclonema gyronemoides
  - †Cyclonema type locality for species – informal
- †Cyclopentagonopa
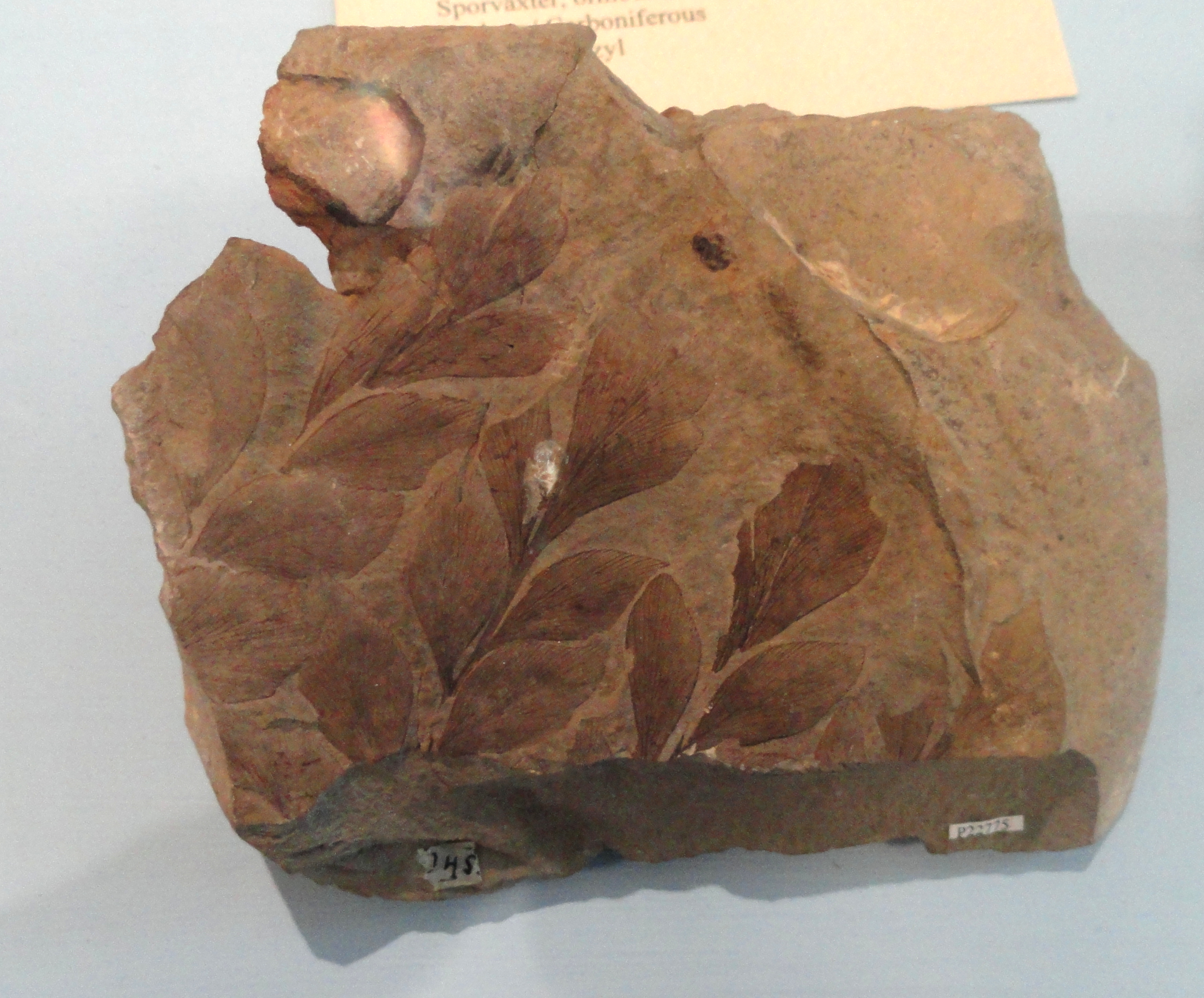
- Fossilized foliage from the Carboniferous seed fern Cyclopteris
  †Cyclopteris
  - †Cyclopteris orbicularis
  - †Cyclopteris trichomanoides
- †Cyclospongia
  - †Cyclospongia discus
- †Cyclotrypa
- †Cylicocrinus
  - †Cylicocrinus canaliculatus
  - †Cylicocrinus indianensis
  - †Cylicocrinus spinosus
- †Cylindrophyllum
  - †Cylindrophyllum compactum
- †Cymatonota
  - †Cymatonota recta
  - †Cymatonota suberecta
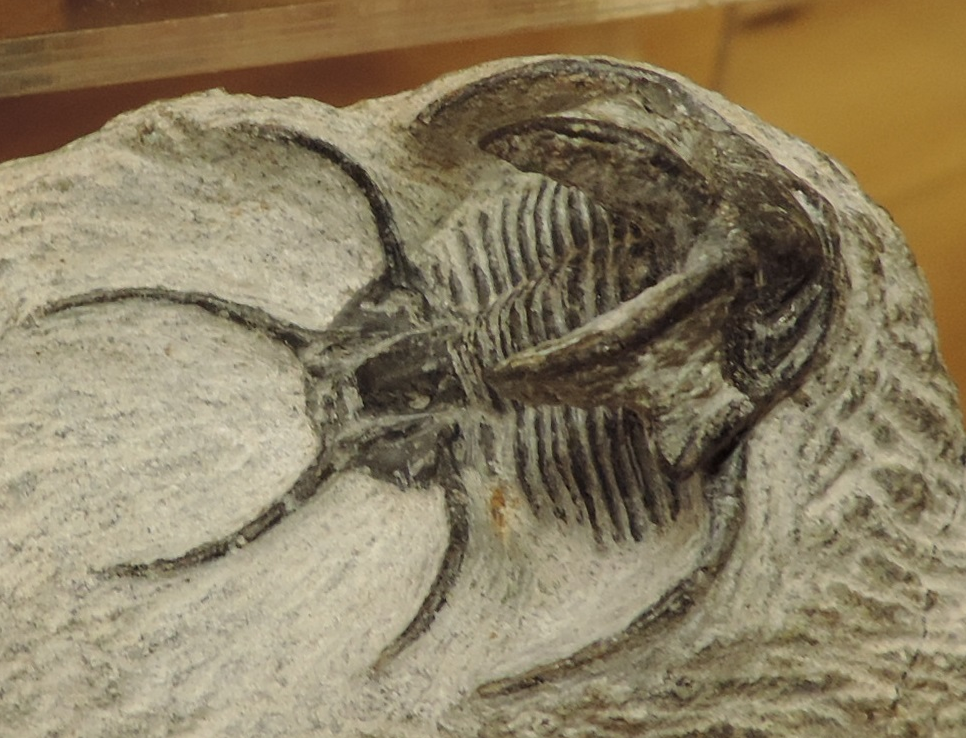
- Fossil of the Late Ordovician-Late Devonian trilobite Cyphaspis
  †Cyphaspis
  - †Cyphaspis christyi
- †Cyphocrinus
  - †Cyphocrinus gorbyi
- †Cyphotrypa
  - †Cyphotrypa osgoodensis
- †Cypricardinia
  - †Cypricardinia indenta
  - †Cypricardinia scitula
- †Cyrtia
  - †Cyrtia exporrecta
- †Cyrtina
  - †Cyrtina burlingtonensis
  - †Cyrtina hamiltonensis
- †Cyrtocerina
  - †Cyrtocerina carinifera
  - †Cyrtocerina madisonensis
  - †Cyrtocerina modesta
  - †Cyrtocerina patella
- †Cyrtodontula
  - †Cyrtodontula sterlingensis
- †Cyrtolites
  - †Cyrtolites hornyi
  - †Cyrtolites ornatus
  - †Cyrtolites sinuosus
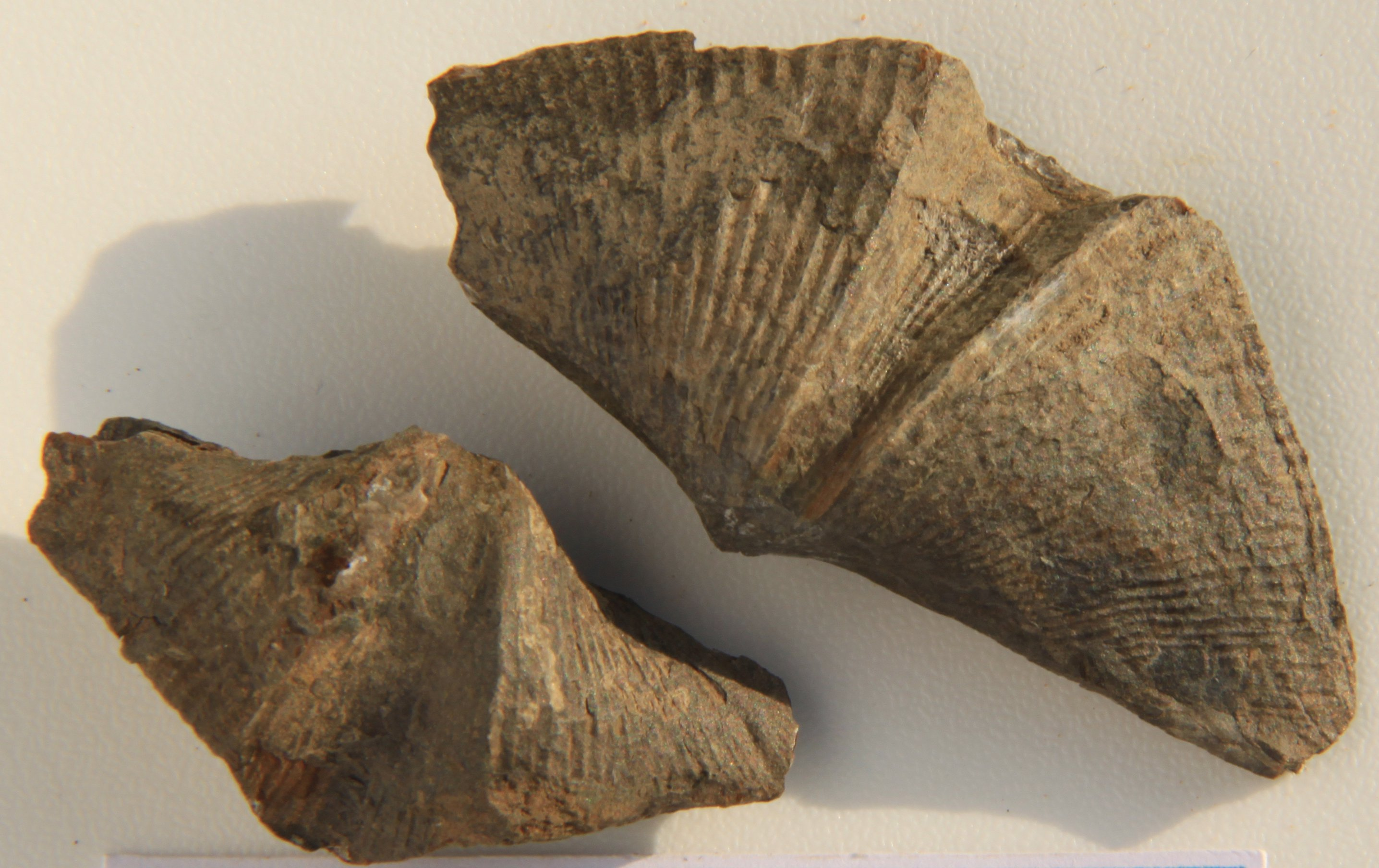
- Fossilized shells of the Middle-Late Devonian brachiopod Cyrtospirifer
  †Cyrtospirifer
  - †Cyrtospirifer latior
- †Cystelasma
- †Cystihalysites
  - †Cystihalysites magnituba
- †Cystiphylloides
  - †Cystiphylloides americanum
  - †Cystiphylloides cicatriciferum
  - †Cystiphylloides hispidum
  - †Cystiphylloides infundibuliformis
  - †Cystiphylloides nanum
  - †Cystiphylloides plicatum
  - †Cystiphylloides pustulatum
  - †Cystiphylloides quadrangulare
  - †Cystiphylloides squamosum
  - †Cystiphylloides tenuiradium
- †Cystiphyllum
- †Cystodictya
  - †Cystodictya lineata
- †Cytocrinus

== D ==
- †Dalejina
  - †Dalejina euorthis
  - †Dalejina hybrida
  - †Dalejina newsomensis
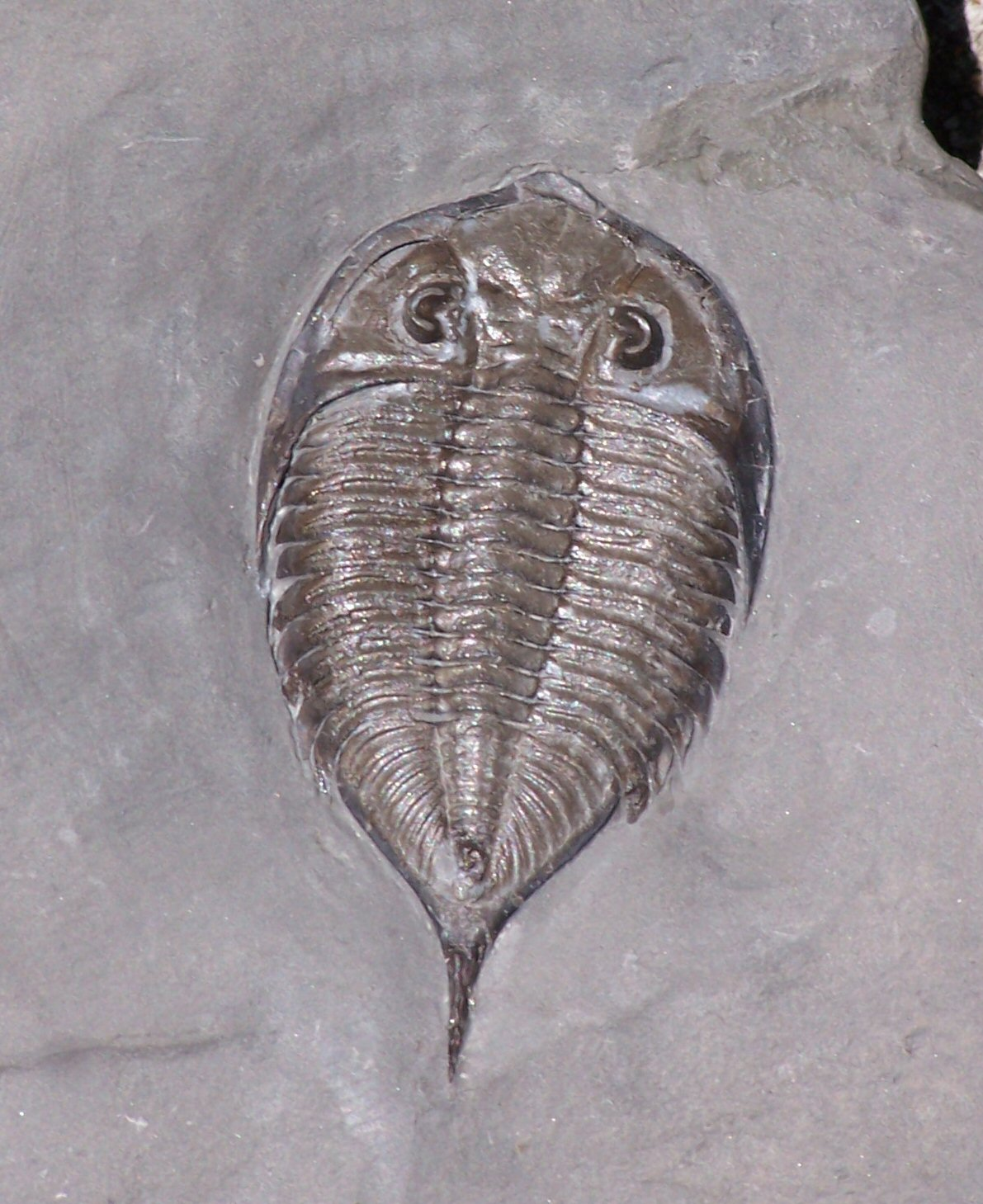
- Fossil of the Late Ordovician-Middle Devonian trilobite Dalmanites
  †Dalmanites
  - †Dalmanites halli
  - †Dalmanites limulurus
- †Danaea
  - †Danaea meccaensis
- †Dawsonoceras
  - †Dawsonoceras americanum
  - †Dawsonoceras annulatum
- †Decadocrinus
  - †Decadocrinus depressus
  - †Decadocrinus stellatus – type locality for species
- †Decadorinus
- †Decaschisma
  - †Decaschisma pulchellum
- †Decatocrinus
- †Deceptrix
  - †Deceptrix albertina
  - †Deceptrix decipiens – tentative report
- †Dechenella
  - †Dechenella boteroi
  - †Dechenella lucasensis
- †Decoroproetus
- †Delicaster
  - †Delicaster enigmaticus
- †Dellea
- †Delthyris
  - †Delthyris clarksvillensis
- †Deltoidospora
  - †Deltoidospora grandis
  - †Deltoidospora sphaerotriangula
- †Dendrina – tentative report
- †Dendrocrinus
- †Densosporites
  - †Densosporites annulatus
  - †Densosporites irregularis
  - †Densosporites sphaerotriangularis
  - †Densosporites spinifer
  - †Densosporites triangularis
- †Desmacriocrinus
  - †Desmacriocrinus moreyi
- †Desmidocrinus
  - †Desmidocrinus dubius
  - †Desmidocrinus laurelianus
- †Devonochonetes
  - †Devonochonetes coronatus
  - †Devonochonetes fragilis
  - †Devonochonetes fragilus
  - †Devonochonetes scitulus
- †Diabolirhynchia
  - †Diabolirhynchia acinus
- †Diabolorhynchia
  - †Diabolorhynchia acinus
- †Diaphorodendron
- †Diaphragmus
  - †Diaphragmus fasciculatus
- †Dichocrinus
  - †Dichocrinus ficus
  - †Dichocrinus simplex
  - †Dichocrinus striatus
  - †Dichocrinus ulrichi
- †Dichostreblocrinus – type locality for genus
  - †Dichostreblocrinus scrobiculus – type locality for species
- †Dicksonites – tentative report
  - †Dicksonites pluckeneti
- †Dicoelosia
  - †Dicoelosia bilobata
- †Diconularia
- †Dictyoclostus
  - †Dictyoclostus inflatus
- †Dictyonema
- †Dictyospongia – tentative report
- †Diedrorynchus
  - †Diedrorynchus conalatum
- †Dielasma
  - †Dielasma arkansana
  - †Dielasma crawfordsvillensis
  - †Dielasma crowfordsvillensis
  - †Dielasma illinoisense
- †Dielasmella
  - †Dielasmella compressa
- †Diestoceras
  - †Diestoceras cyrtocerinoides
  - †Diestoceras eos
  - †Diestoceras indianense
  - †Diestoceras pupa
  - †Diestoceras reversum – tentative report
  - †Diestoceras shideleri
  - †Diestoceras shiderleri
  - †Diestoceras vasiforme
  - †Diestoceras waynesvillense – type locality for species
- †Dimegelasma
- †Dimerocrinites
  - †Dimerocrinites carleyi
  - †Dimerocrinites inornatus
  - †Dimerocrinites occidentalis
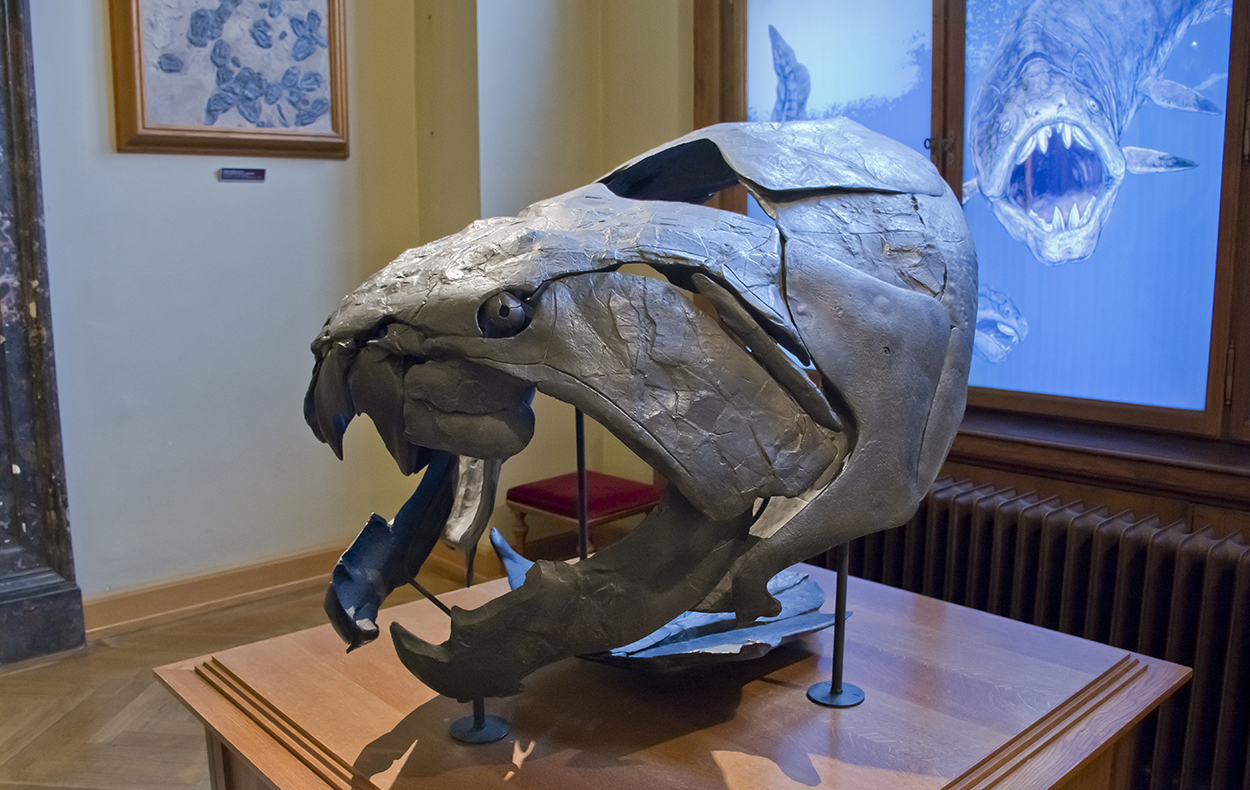
- Mounted skull of the Late Devonian placoderm fish Dunkleosteus
  †Dinicthys
- †Dinobolus
  - †Dinobolus conradi – or unidentified comparable form
- †Diplochone
  - †Diplochone greenei
- †Diplothmema
  - †Diplothmema obtusiloba
- †Diplotrypa
  - †Diplotrypa nummiformis
- †Disphyllum
  - †Disphyllum cohaerens
  - †Disphyllum synaptophylloides – type locality for species
- †Ditoecholasma
  - †Ditoecholasma acutiannulatum
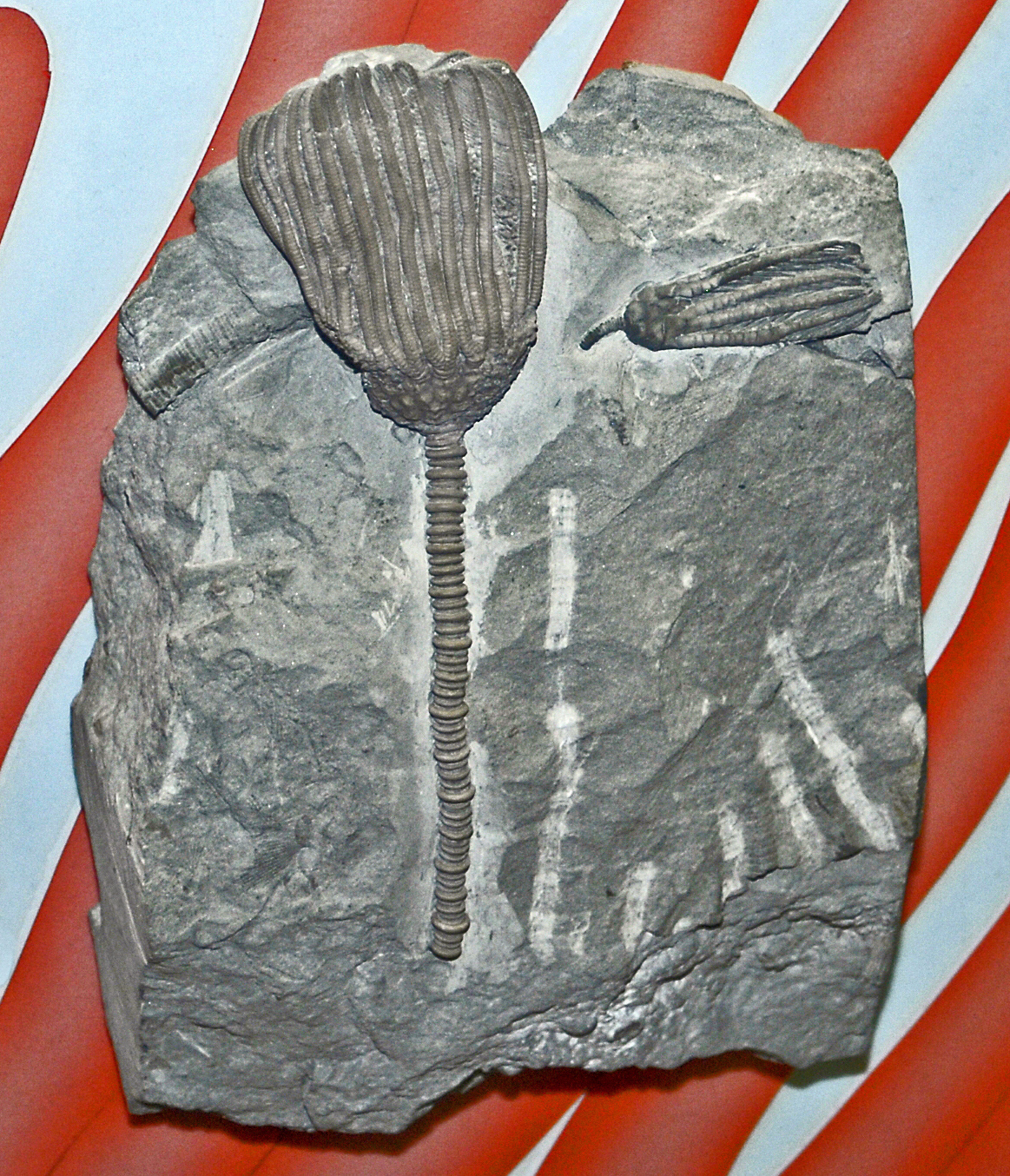
- Fossils of the Carboniferous crinoid ("sea lily") Dizygocrinus
  †Dizygocrinus
  - †Dizygocrinus indianaensis
  - †Dizygocrinus indianensis
  - †Dizygocrinus venustus – or unidentified comparable form
  - †Dizygocrinus whitei – or unidentified comparable form
- †Dolatocrinus
  - †Dolatocrinus bellarugosus
  - †Dolatocrinus bulbaceus
  - †Dolatocrinus corporosus
  - †Dolatocrinus greeni
- †Dolerorthis
  - †Dolerorthis flabellites
  - †Dolerorthis interplicata
- †Dorycrinus
  - †Dorycrinus gouldi
- †Douvillina
  - †Douvillina inaequistriata
- †Drabia – tentative report
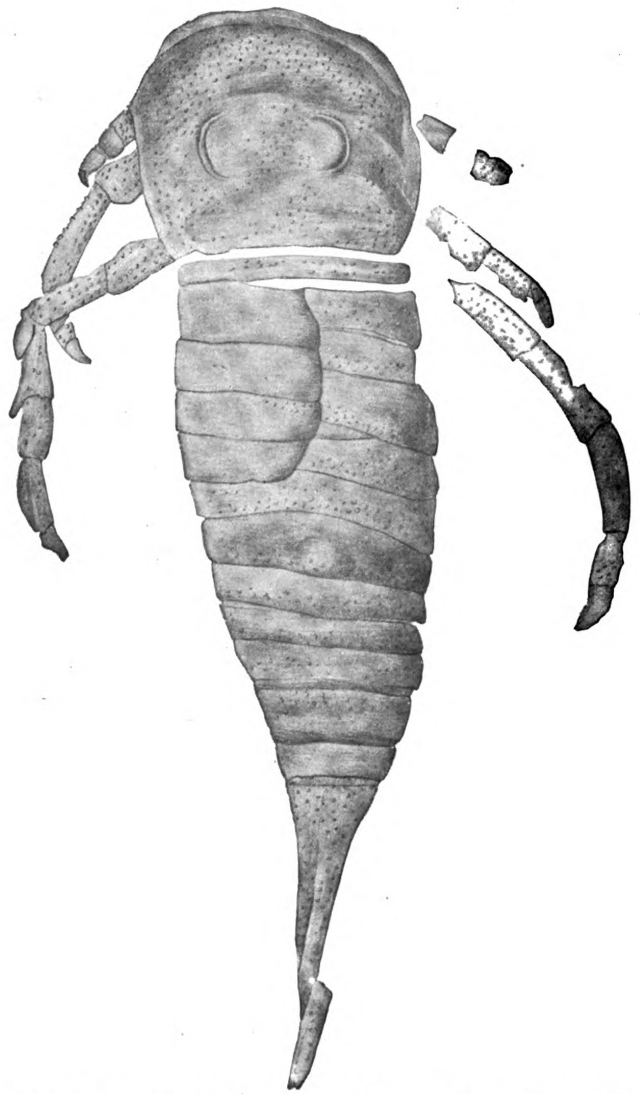
- Fossil of the Silurian-Late Devonian eurypterid ("sea scorpion") Drepanopterus
  †Drepanopterus
- †Drymopora
  - †Drymopora fascicularis
  - †Drymopora frutectosa
  - †Drymopora jacksoni
  - †Drymopora procumbens
- †Duncanella
  - †Duncanella borealis
- †Dyscritella
- †Dystactospongia
  - †Dystactospongia madisonensis

== E ==
- †Ecclimadictyon
  - †Ecclimadictyon fastigiatum – or unidentified comparable form
- †Echinoconchus
  - †Echinoconchus alternatus
  - †Echinoconchus biseriatus
- †Edaphophyllum
  - †Edaphophyllum bifurcatum
  - †Edaphophyllum bipartitum
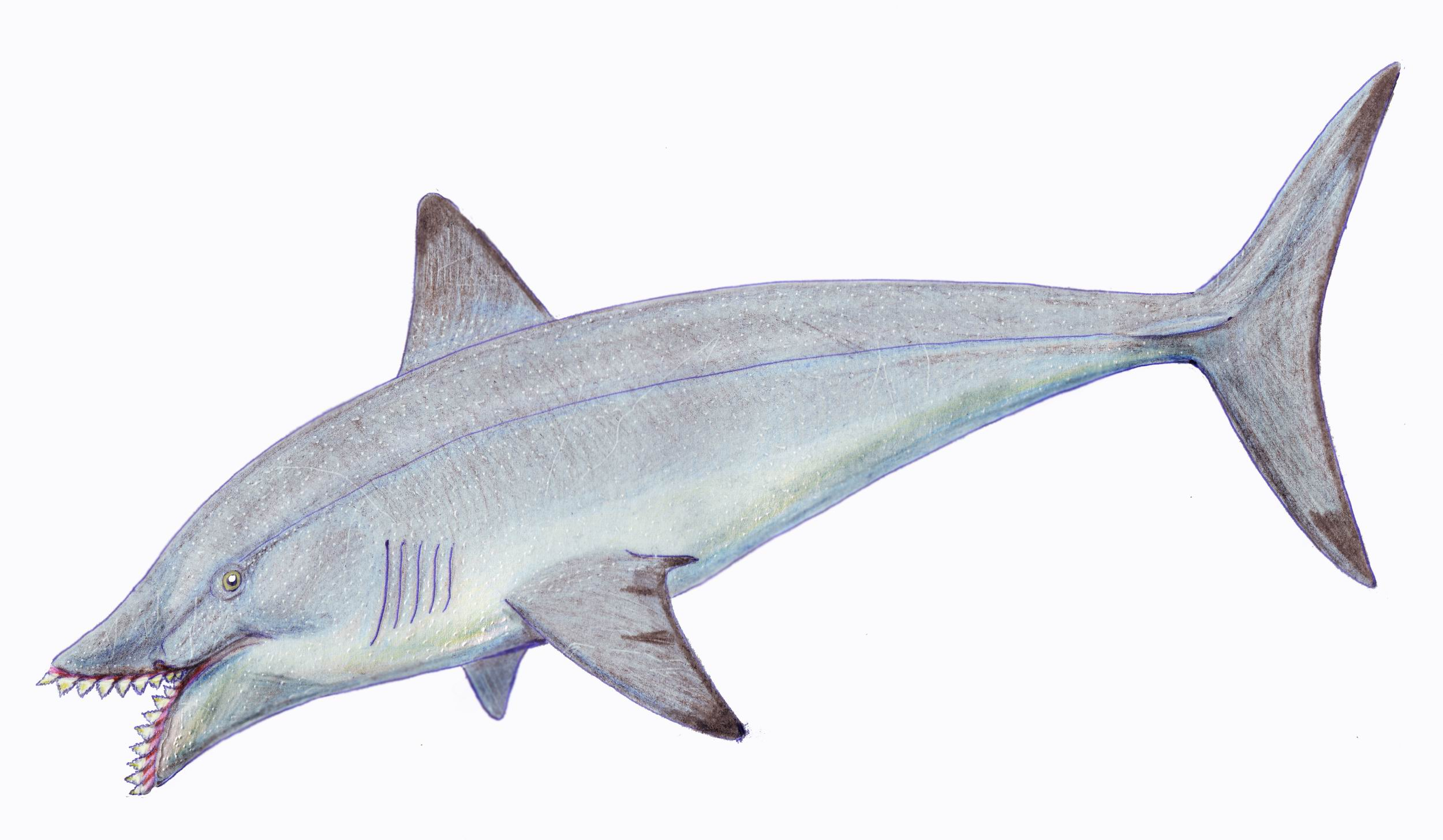
- Life restoration of the Late Devonian-Carboniferous Chimaera relative Edestus
  †Edestus
  - †Edestus heinrichi
- †Edmondia
  - †Edmondia varsoviensis
- †Elasmonema
  - †Elasmonema bellatula
- †Elaterites
  - †Elaterites triferens
- †Eldredgeops
  - †Eldredgeops rana
- †Elita
  - †Elita fimbriata
- †Elvinia
- †Elytron
  - †Elytron elimatus
- †Emmonsia
  - †Emmonsia amplissima
  - †Emmonsia bacula
  - †Emmonsia convexa
  - †Emmonsia cymosa
  - †Emmonsia emmonsi
  - †Emmonsia epidermata
  - †Emmonsia eximia
  - †Emmonsia radiciformis
  - †Emmonsia ramosa
  - †Emmonsia tuberosa
- †Emperocrinus
  - †Emperocrinus indianensis
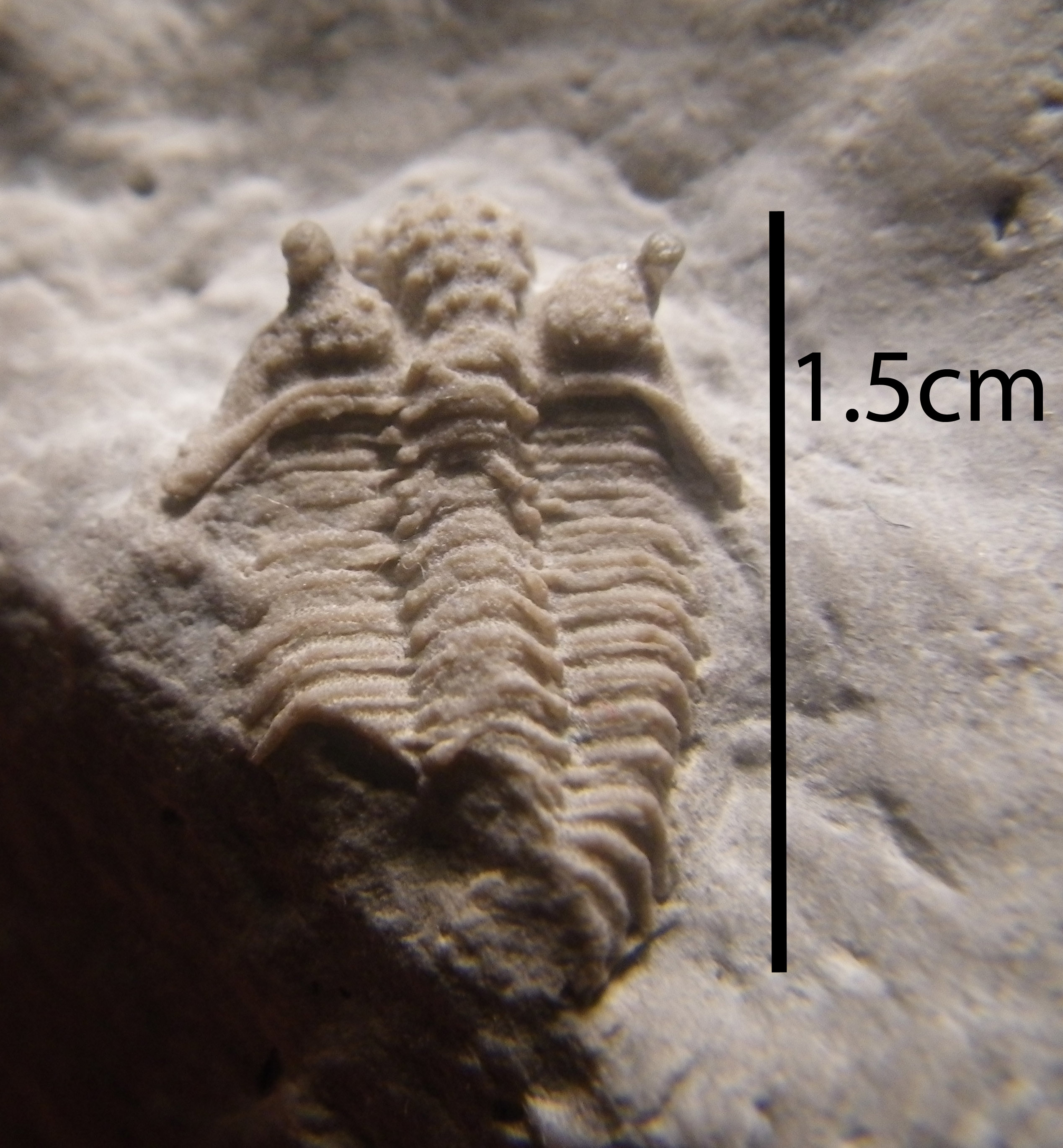
- Fossil of the Middle Ordovician-Early Devonian trilobite Encrinurus
  †Encrinurus
  - †Encrinurus indianaensis
- †Endosporites
  - †Endosporites globiformis
  - †Endosporites plicatus
- †Enterolasma
  - †Enterolasma caliculum
- †Eocaudia
- Eocaudina
  - †Eocaudina marginata
  - †Eocaudina mccormacki
- †Eochonetes
  - †Eochonetes clarksvillensis
- †Eodictyonella (formerly Dictyonella)
  - †Eodictyonella coralifera – or unidentified comparable form
  - †Eodictyonella reticulata
- †Eohalysiocrinus
  - †Eohalysiocrinus stigmatus
- †Eoparisocrinus
  - †Eoparisocrinus siluricus
- †Eoplectodonta
  - †Eoplectodonta prolongatus
  - †Eoplectodonta transversalis
- †Eoplicanoplia
- †Eospinatrypa
  - †Eospinatrypa nodostriata
- †Eospirifer
  - †Eospirifer eudora
  - †Eospirifer foggi
  - †Eospirifer niagarensis
  - †Eospirifer radiatus
- †Eotomaria
  - †Eotomaria laphami
  - †Eotomaria trochoides – type locality for species
- †Eotrochus
  - †Eotrochus tenuimarginatus – type locality for species
- †Eratocrinus
  - †Eratocrinus salemensis
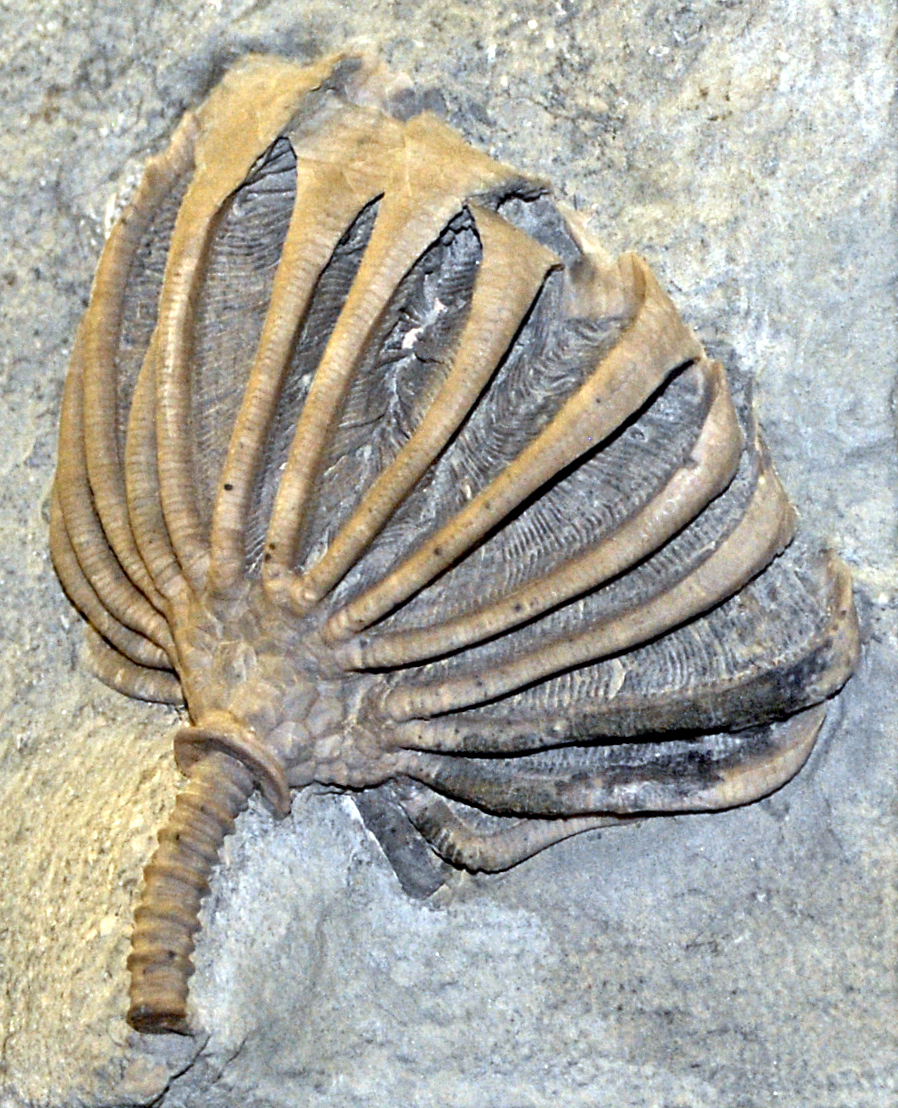
- Fossilized calyx and partial stem of the Carboniferous crinoid ("sea lily") Eretmocrinus
  †Eretmocrinus
  - †Eretmocrinus cassedayanus – tentative report
  - †Eretmocrinus magnificus
- †Eridophyllum
  - †Eridophyllum apertum
  - †Eridophyllum archiaci
  - †Eridophyllum coagulatum
  - †Eridophyllum conjunctum
  - †Eridophyllum seriale
- †Eridopora
  - †Eridopora macrostoma
- †Eridorthis
  - †Eridorthis nicklesi
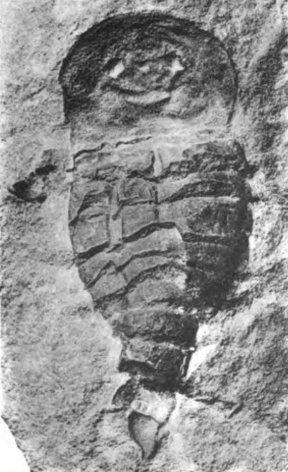
- Fossils (figures 2–10) of the Silurian-Devonian eurypterid ("sea scorpion") Erieopterus
  †Erieopterus
  - †Erieopterus limuloides
- †Eucalyptocrinites
  - †Eucalyptocrinites caelatus
  - †Eucalyptocrinites crassus
  - †Eucalyptocrinites tuberculatus
- †Eucheirocrinus
  - †Eucheirocrinus indianensis
- †Euchondria
  - †Euchondria grandis – tentative report
- †Euconospira
  - †Euconospira conula – type locality for species
  - †Euconospira elegantula – type locality for species
- †Eugeneodus – type locality for genus
  - †Eugeneodus richardsoni – type locality for species
- †Eumetria
  - †Eumetria costata
  - †Eumetria marcyi
  - †Eumetria vera
  - †Eumetria verneuiliana
  - †Eumetria verneuliana
- †Eunella
  - †Eunella harmonia
- †Eunema
  - †Eunema helicteres
- †Eunicites
- †Euomphalopterus
  - †Euomphalopterus alatus
- †Eupachycrinus
  - †Eupachycrinus boydii
- †Eurychilina
  - †Eurychilina striatomarginata
- †Eusphenopteris
- †Euthyrhachis
  - †Euthyrhachis indianense
- †Eutrophoceras

== F ==
- †Fabalicypris
- †Fardenia
  - †Fardenia subplana
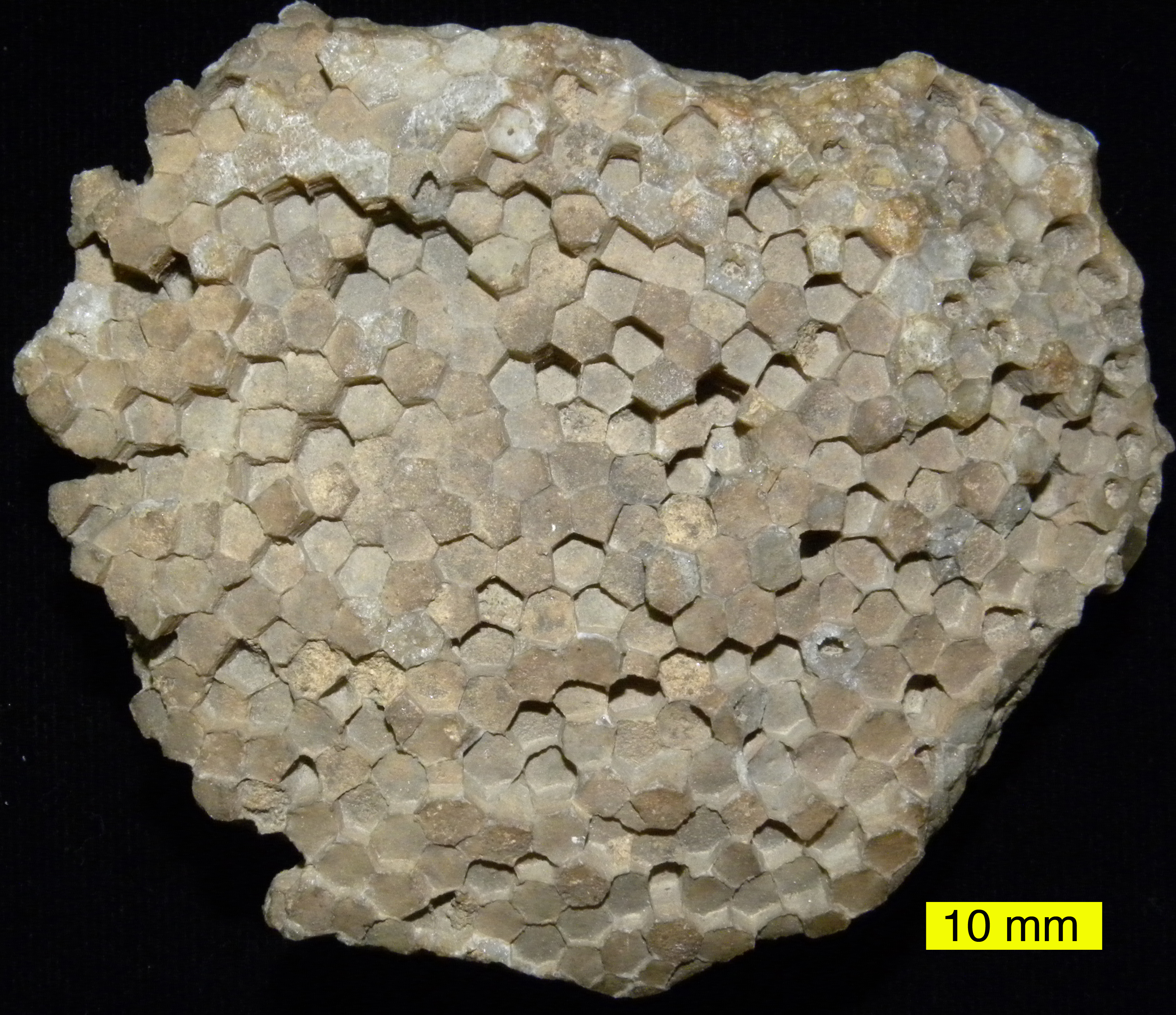
- Fossil of the Late Ordovician-Permian tabulate coral Favosites
  †Favosites
  - †Favosites arbor
  - †Favosites baculus
  - †Favosites biloculi
  - †Favosites clelandi
  - †Favosites cristatus
  - †Favosites discoideus
  - †Favosites favosus
  - †Favosites forbesi
  - †Favosites forbsei
  - †Favosites goodwini
  - †Favosites hisingeri
  - †Favosites hispidus – or unidentified comparable form
  - †Favosites impeditus
  - †Favosites mundus
  - †Favosites niagarensis
  - †Favosites occidentalis
  - †Favosites patellatus – type locality for species
  - †Favosites pirum
  - †Favosites placentus
  - †Favosites proximatus
  - †Favosites quercus
  - †Favosites ramulosus
  - †Favosites rotundituba
  - †Favosites spinigerus
  - †Favosites turbinatus
- †Fayettoceras
  - †Fayettoceras thompsoni
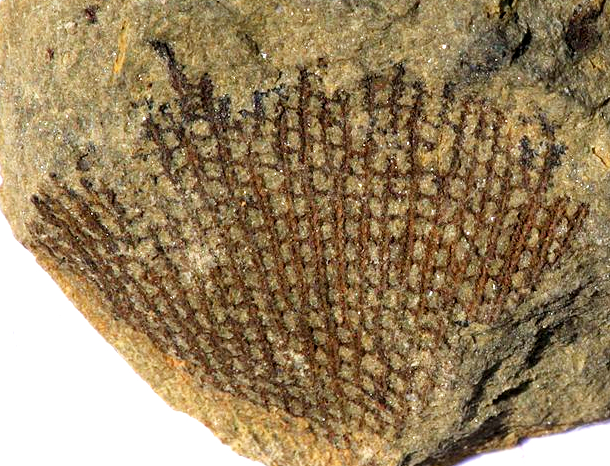
- Fossil of the Middle Ordovician-Late Triassic bryozoan ("moss animal") Fenestella
  †Fenestella
  - †Fenestella burlingtonensis
  - †Fenestella cestriensis
  - †Fenestella exigua
  - †Fenestella matheri
- †Fenestralia
- †Ferganella
- †Fimbrispirifer
  - †Fimbrispirifer divaricatus
  - †Fimbrispirifer venustus
- †Finitiporus
  - †Finitiporus boardmani
- †Fistulipora
  - †Fistulipora compressa
  - †Fistulipora compressus
  - †Fistulipora excellens
  - †Fistulipora incrustans
  - †Fistulipora perdensa
  - †Fistulipora promiscua
  - †Fistulipora spergenensis
- †Fletcheria
- †Flexaria
  - †Flexaria annosa – or unidentified related form
  - †Flexaria floydensis
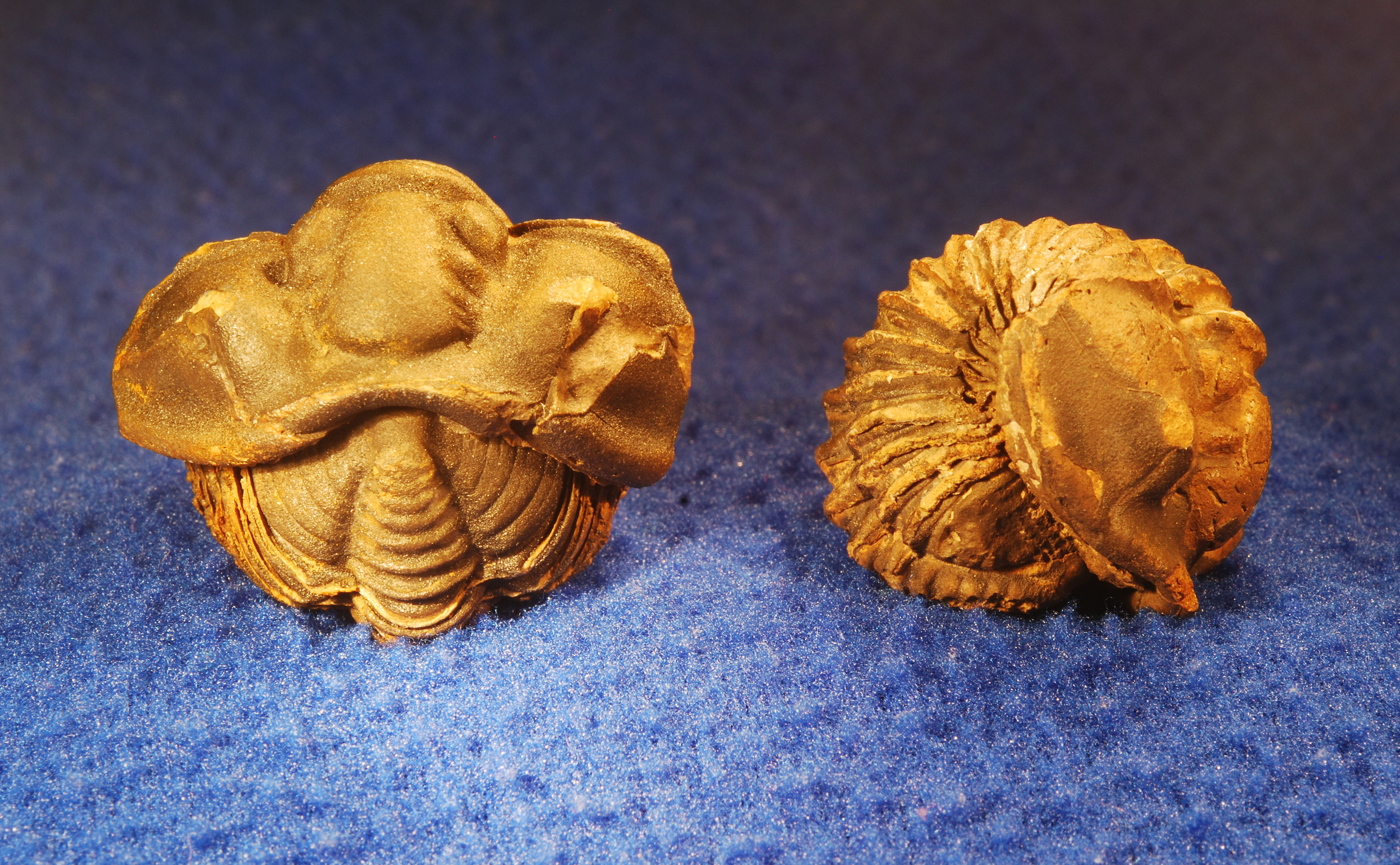
- Front (left) and right side (right) views of an enrolled fossil of the Middle Ordovician-Silurian trilobite Flexicalymene
  †Flexicalymene
  - †Flexicalymene meeki
- †Florinites
  - †Florinites antiquus
  - †Florinites millotti
  - †Florinites similis
  - †Florinites visendus
  - †Florinites volans
- †Floweria
  - †Floweria chemungensis

== G ==
- †Gattendorfia
  - †Gattendorfia alteri – type locality for species
- †Gazacrinus
  - †Gazacrinus depressus
  - †Gazacrinus inornatus
  - †Gazacrinus magnus
  - †Gazacrinus ventricosus
- †Gennaeocrinus
  - †Gennaeocrinus carinatus
- †Gigantopteris
  - †Gigantopteris dawsoni
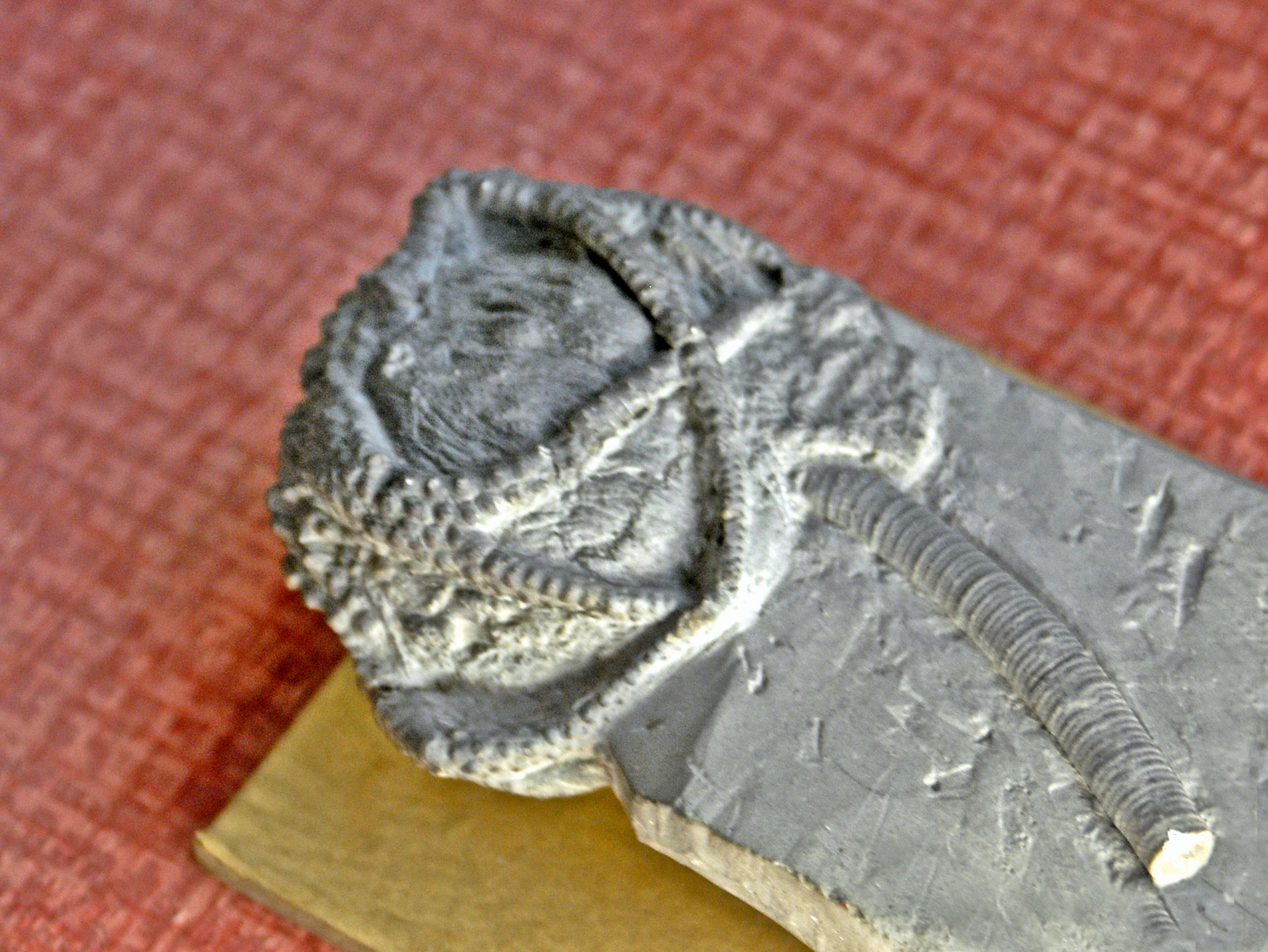
- Fossilized calyx and partial stem of the Devonian-Carboniferous crinoid ("sea lily") Gilbertsocrinus
  †Gilbertsocrinus
  - †Gilbertsocrinus tuberosus
- †Gilliodus
  - †Gilliodus orvillei – type locality for species
  - †Gilliodus peyeri – type locality for species
- †Girtyella
  - †Girtyella brevilobata
  - †Girtyella indianensis
- †Girtyspira
  - †Girtyspira canaliculata – type locality for species
- †Gissocrinus
- †Glabrocingulum
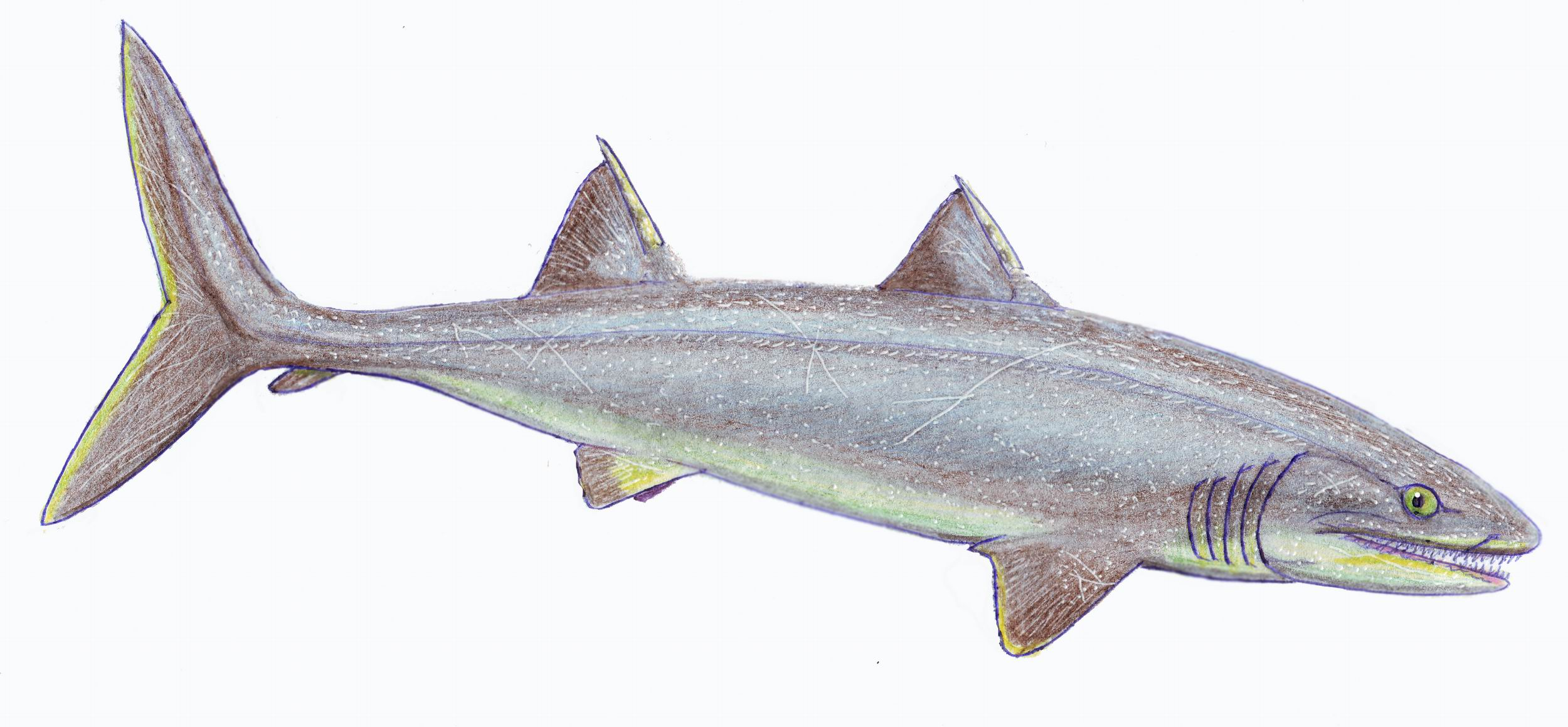
- Life restoration of the Carboniferous shark Glikmanius
  †Glikmanius
  - †Glikmanius occidentalis
- Glomospira
  - †Glomospira articulosa
- †Glyphodeta
  - †Glyphodeta terebriformis – type locality for species
- †Glyptambon
  - †Glyptambon verrucosus
- †Glyptaster
- †Glyptocrinus
- †Glyptodesma
- †Glyptopora
- †Glyptorthis
  - †Glyptorthis insculpta
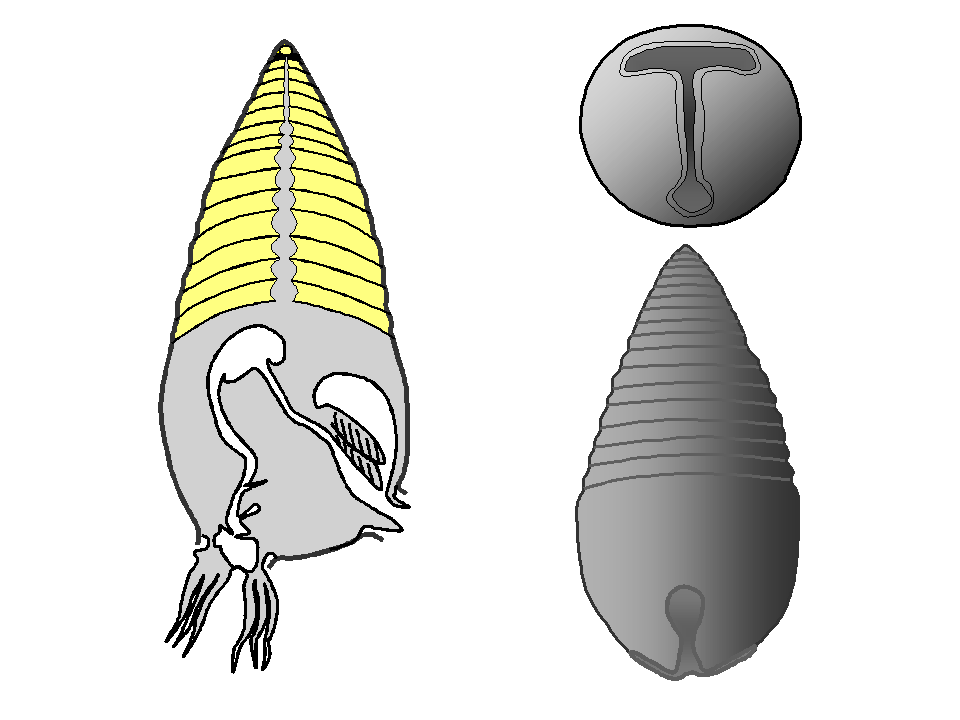
- Diagram depicting the restored internal anatomy and multiple views of the shell of the Silurian nautiloid cephalopod Gomphoceras
  †Gomphoceras
  - †Gomphoceras projectum
  - †Gomphoceras wabashense
- †Gomphocystites
  - †Gomphocystites indianensis
- †Gorbyoceras
  - †Gorbyoceras crossi
  - †Gorbyoceras duncanae
  - †Gorbyoceras gorbyi
  - †Gorbyoceras hammelli
- †Gosseletina
  - †Gosseletina subglobosa – type locality for species
- †Granasporites
  - †Granasporites medius
- †Granatocrinus
  - †Granatocrinus granulosus – tentative report
- †Granulatisporites
  - †Granulatisporites granularis
  - †Granulatisporites minutus
  - †Granulatisporites pallidus
  - †Granulatisporites parvus – or unidentified comparable form
  - †Granulatisporites tuberculatus
- †Graphiadactyllis
  - †Graphiadactyllis fayettevillensis
  - †Graphiadactyllis fernglenesis
  - †Graphiadactyllis granopunctatus
- †Graphiadactylloides
  - †Graphiadactylloides imopmemsos
  - †Graphiadactylloides lineatus – or unidentified related form
  - †Graphiadactylloides moridgei
  - †Graphiadactylloides unionensis
- †Graphiadactylus
- †Graphosterigma
  - †Graphosterigma grammodes
- †Graptodictya
- †Greenops
  - †Greenops chilmanae
  - †Greenops pleione
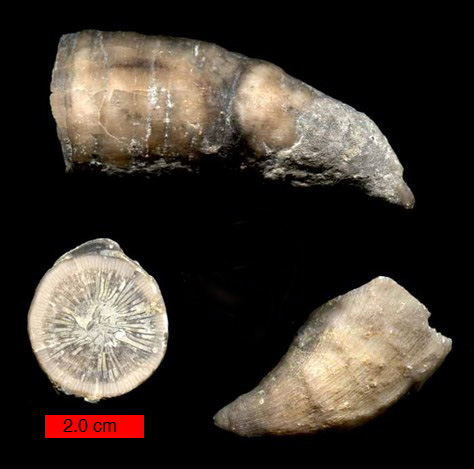
- Multiple views of a fossil of the Ordovician horn coral Grewingkia
  †Grewingkia
  - †Grewingkia canadensis
  - †Grewingkia rusticum
- †Griffithidella
  - †Griffithidella doris
  - †Griffithidella welleri
- †Gypidula
  - †Gypidula nucleus

== H ==
- †Hadroblastus
- †Hadrophyllum
  - †Hadrophyllum nettelrothi
  - †Hadrophyllum orbignyi
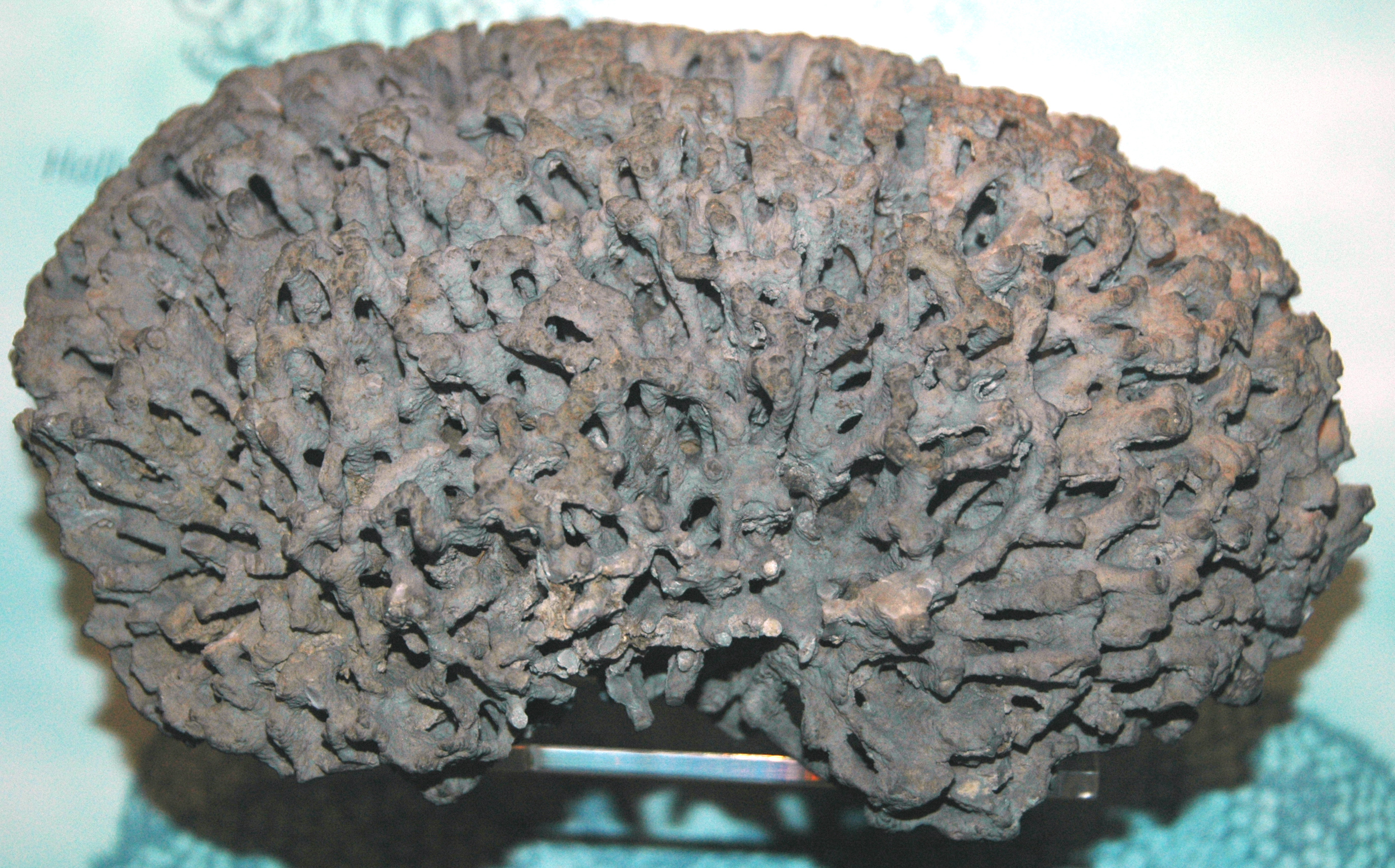
- Fossil of the Ordovician bryozoan ("moss animal") Hallopora
  †Hallopora
  - †Hallopora elegantula
  - †Hallopora subnodosa
- †Halysiocrinus
  - †Halysiocrinus tunicatus
- †Halysites
  - †Halysites catenularia
  - †Halysites labyrinthicus
  - †Halysites microporus
- †Hamburgia
- †Haplistion
  - †Haplistion armstrongi
- †Hapsiphyllum
  - †Hapsiphyllum cassedayi
- †Harpidella
  - †Harpidella christyi
- †Harpidium – tentative report
- †Healdia
- †Hebertella
  - †Hebertella alveata
  - †Hebertella occidentalis
  - †Hebertella sinuata
  - †Hebertella subjugata
- †Hedeina
  - †Hedeina eudora
- †Hederella
  - †Hederella alpenensis
  - †Hederella delicatula
  - †Hederella filiformis
  - †Hederella thedfordensis
- †Helicotoma
  - †Helicotoma marginata
- †Heliolites
  - †Heliolites megastoma
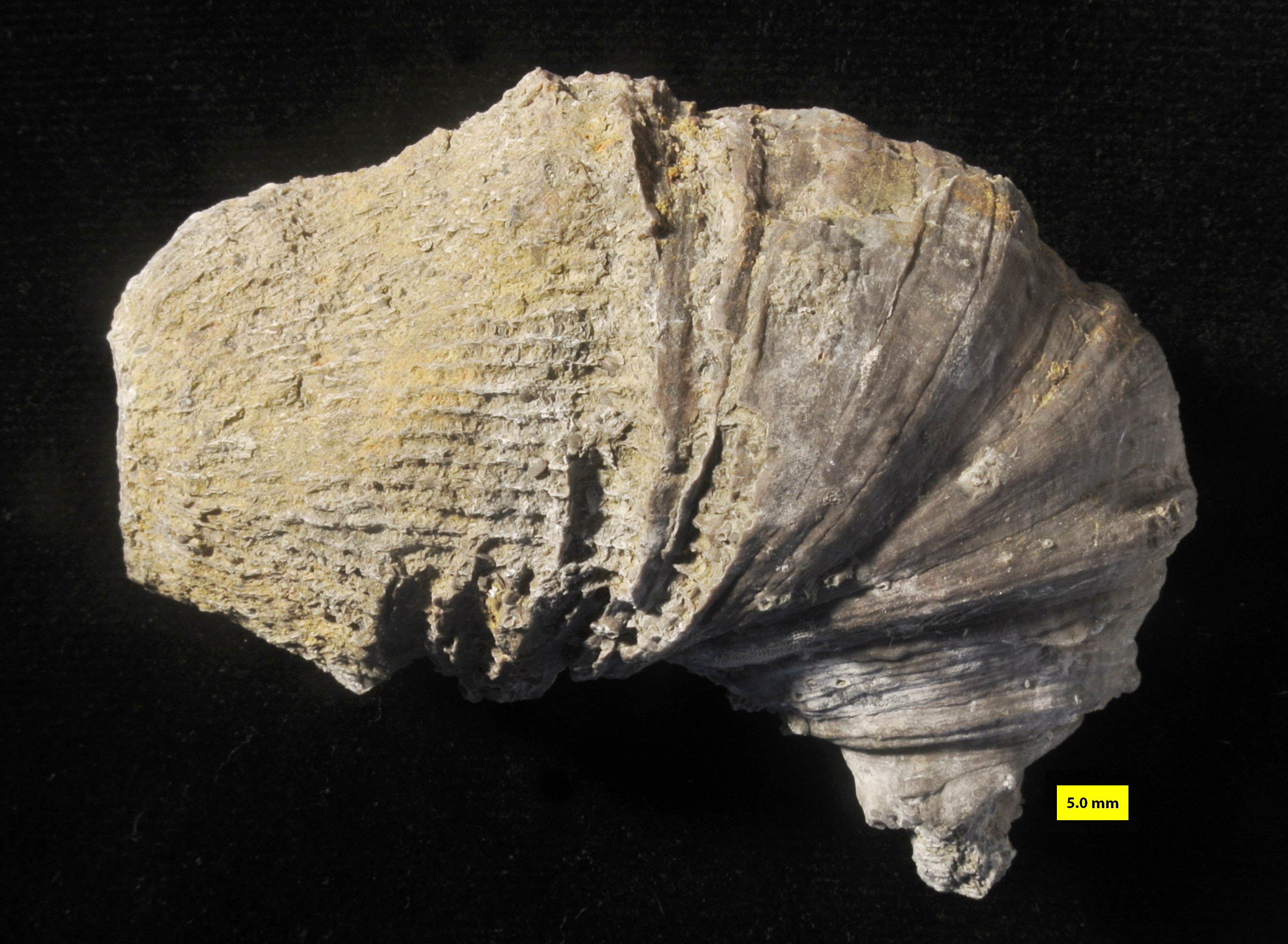
- Fossil of the Middle Devonian horn coral Heliophyllum
  †Heliophyllum
  - †Heliophyllum agassizi
  - †Heliophyllum denticulatum
  - †Heliophyllum halli
  - †Heliophyllum incrassatum
  - †Heliophyllum latericrescens
  - †Heliophyllum venatum
  - †Heliophyllum verticale
- †Helodus
  - †Helodus incisus
- †Helopora
  - †Helopora inexpectata
- †Hemitrypa
- †Hennigopora
  - †Hennigopora apta
- †Heslerodus
  - †Heslerodus divergens
- †Hesperorthis
- †Heteralosia
  - †Heteralosia keokuk
- †Heterangium
- †Heterophrentis
  - †Heterophrentis annulata
  - †Heterophrentis cyathiformis
  - †Heterophrentis duplicata
  - †Heterophrentis inflata
  - †Heterophrentis irregularis
  - †Heterophrentis nitida – tentative report
  - †Heterophrentis ovalis
  - †Heterophrentis prolifica
  - †Heterophrentis rafinesqui
  - †Heterophrentis simplex
  - †Heterophrentis trisutura
- †Heterotrypa
  - †Heterotrypa microstigma
  - †Heterotrypa perplexa
  - †Heterotrypa prolifica
  - †Heterotrypa singularis
  - †Heterotrypa subramosa
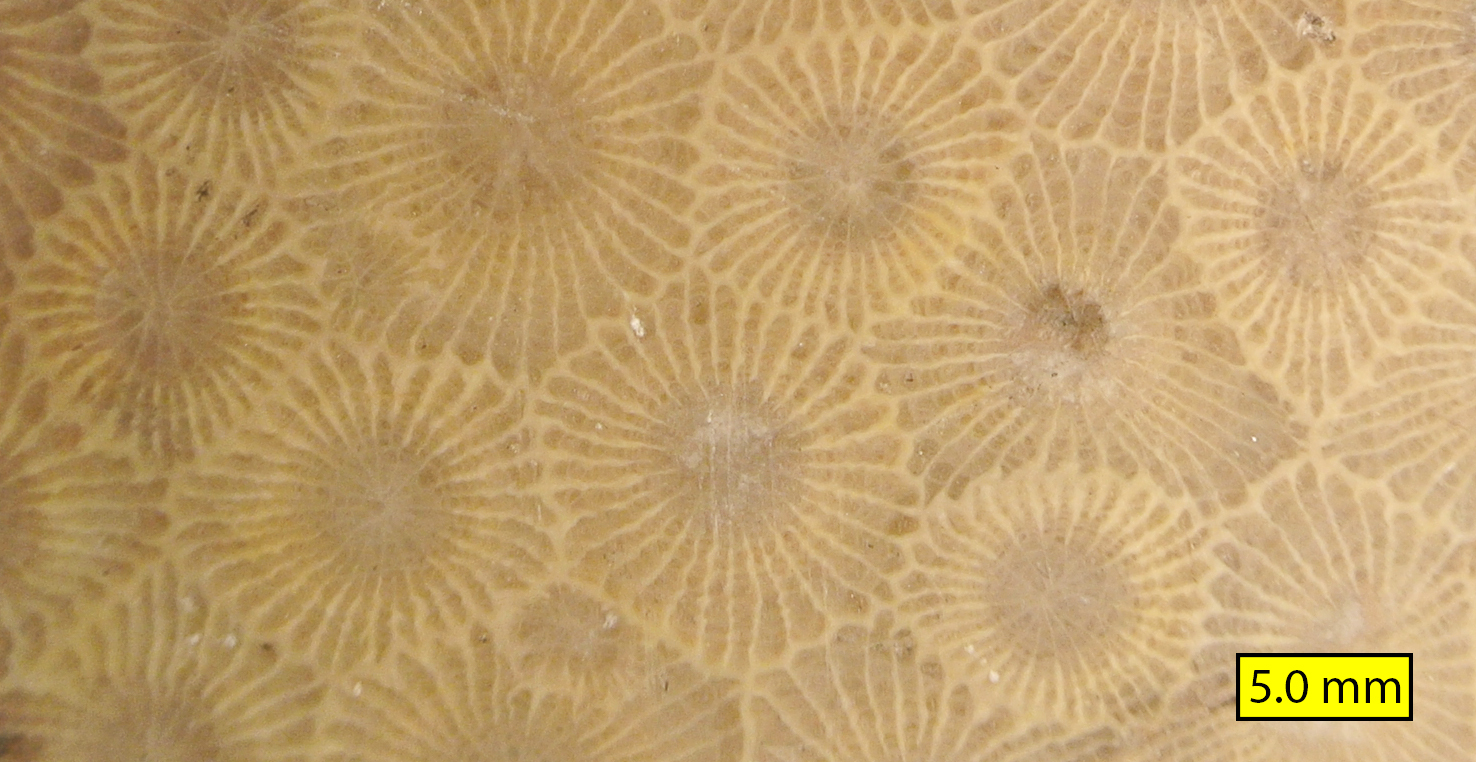
- Fossil of the Devonian colonial rugose coral Hexagonaria, also known as a Petoskey stone
  †Hexagonaria
  - †Hexagonaria bella
  - †Hexagonaria cincta
  - †Hexagonaria curta
  - †Hexagonaria ovoidea
  - †Hexagonaria partita
  - †Hexagonaria ponderosa
  - †Hexagonaria prisma
- †Hexameroceras
  - †Hexameroceras cacabiforme
  - †Hexameroceras delphicolum
- †Hindella – tentative report
- †Hindia
- †Hippocardia
  - †Hippocardia ohioense
- †Hirneacrinus
  - †Hirneacrinus cupellaeformis – type locality for species
  - †Hirneacrinus perplanus – type locality for species
- †Hiscobeccus
  - †Hiscobeccus capax
- †Histocrinus
  - †Histocrinus coreyi
  - †Histocrinus grandis
  - †Histocrinus graphicus
- †Hizemodendron
  - †Hizemodendron serratum
- †Hoareicardia
  - †Hoareicardia cunea
- †Holcocrinus
  - †Holcocrinus nodobrachiatus
- †Holcospermum
- †Holocystites
  - †Holocystites abnormalis
  - †Holocystites abnormis
  - †Holocystites alternatus
  - †Holocystites clavus
  - †Holocystites faberi – or unidentified comparable form
  - †Holocystites ornatus
  - †Holocystites ovatus
  - †Holocystites parvulus
  - †Holocystites perlongus
  - †Holocystites scutellatus
  - †Holocystites spangleri
  - †Holocystites splendens
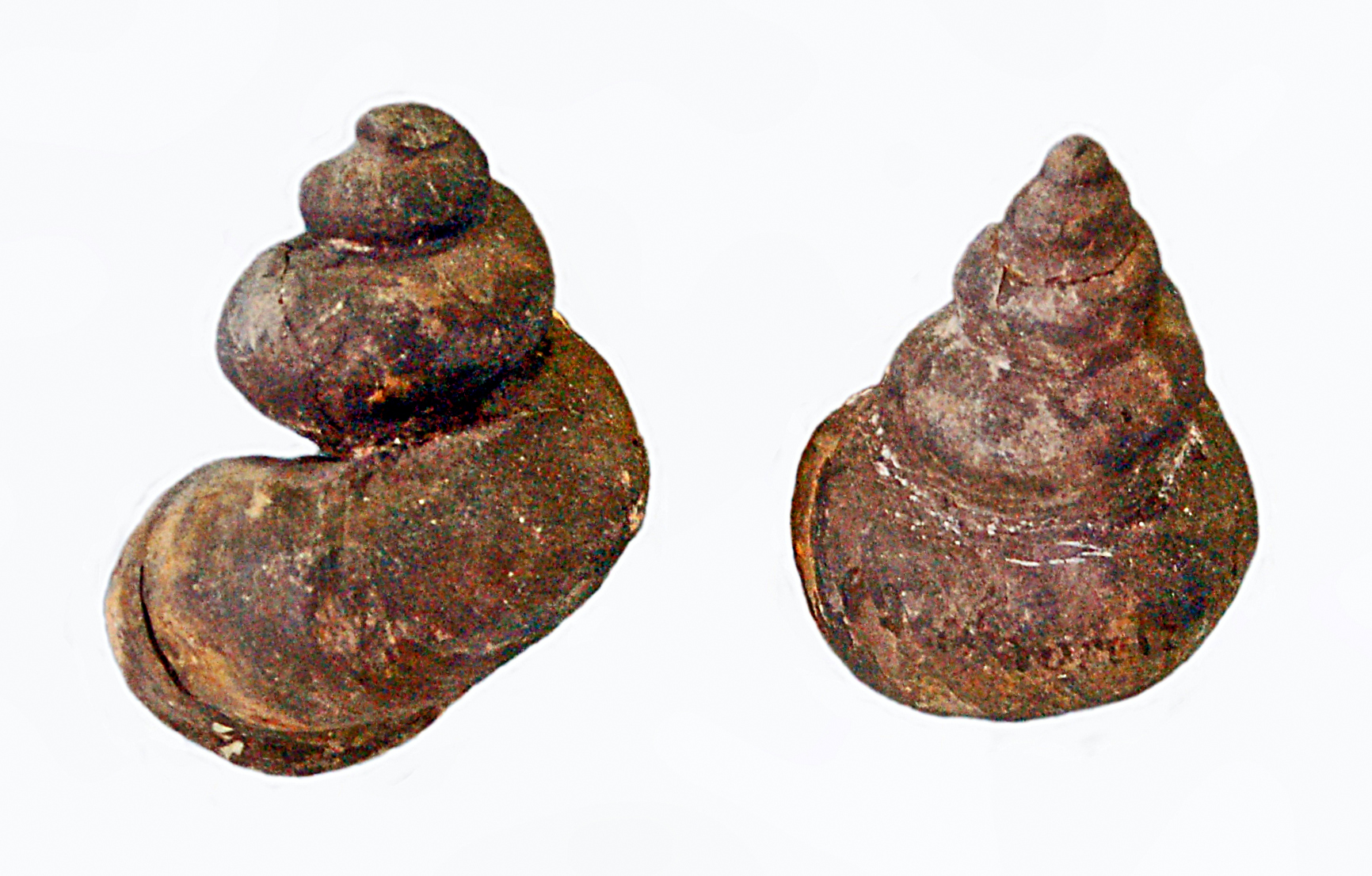
- Fossilized shells of the Ordovician-Carboniferous sea snail Holopea
  †Holopea
  - †Holopea ampla
- †Holtedahlina
  - †Holtedahlina sulcata
- †Homalophyllum
  - †Homalophyllum fusiformis
  - †Homalophyllum herzeri
  - †Homalophyllum ungulum
- †Homocrinus
- †Homoeospira
  - †Homoeospira evax
- †Homotrypa
  - †Homotrypa alta – or unidentified related form
  - †Homotrypa austini – or unidentified comparable form
  - †Homotrypa communis
  - †Homotrypa flabellaris
  - †Homotrypa gelasinosa
  - †Homotrypa nodulosa – or unidentified comparable form
  - †Homotrypa richmondensis
  - †Homotrypa wortheni
- †Homotrypella
- †Hondichnus
  - †Hondichnus monroensis
- †Hormotoma
  - †Hormotoma gracilis
- †Howellella
  - †Howellella crispa
  - †Howellella crispus
- †Hydnoangulus – type locality for genus
  - †Hydnoangulus quadratus – type locality for species
- †Hydriodictya – tentative report
  - †Hydriodictya cyclix
- †Hylodecrinus
  - †Hylodecrinus sculptus

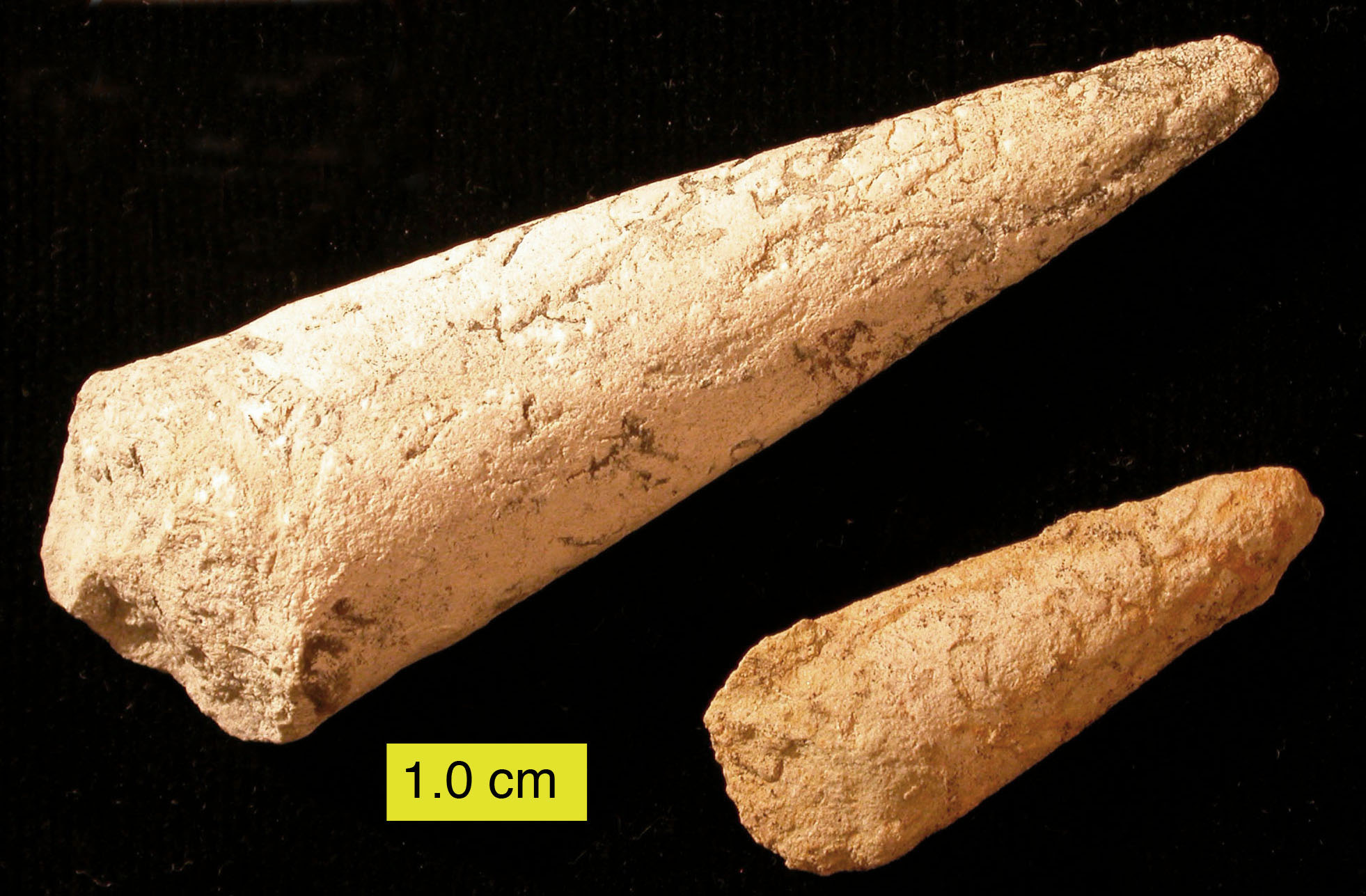
Fossilized shells of the Cambrian-Permian brachiopod relative Hyolitha

†Hyolithes

  - †Hyolithes monroensis
- Hyperammina
  - †Hyperammina bulbosa
  - †Hyperammina casteri
  - †Hyperammina constricta
  - †Hyperammina gracilenta
  - †Hyperammina kentuckyensis
  - †Hyperammina rockfordensis
- †Hypergonia
  - †Hypergonia attenuata – type locality for species
  - †Hypergonia turritella – type locality for species
  - †Hypergonia vermicula – type locality for species
- †Hypselocrinus
  - †Hypselocrinus hoveyi
  - †Hypselocrinus indianensis

== I ==
- †Ichthyorachis
- †Icriodus
  - †Icriodus latericrescens
- †Icthyocrinus
  - †Icthyocrinus corbis
  - †Icthyocrinus subangularis
- †Ildraites
  - †Ildraites howelli
- †Illaenoides
- †Illaenus
- †Imbrexia
  - †Imbrexia forbesi
  - †Imbrexia montgomeryensis
  - †Imbrexia mortonana
- †Imitoceras
  - †Imitoceras rotatorium
- †Iniopera – type locality for genus
  - †Iniopera richardsoni – type locality for species
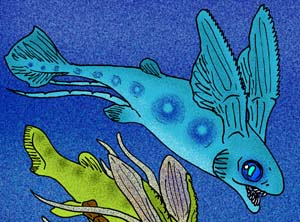
- Life restoration of the Carboniferous Chimaera relative Iniopteryx
  †Iniopteryx
  - †Iniopteryx rushlaui
- †Inocaulis
- †Intrapora
  - †Intrapora irregularis
- †Iocrinus
- †Ischadites
  - †Ischadites subturbinatus
  - †Ischadites tenuis
- †Ischyrodonta
  - †Ischyrodonta decipiens
  - †Ischyrodonta ovalis
  - †Ischyrodonta truncata
- †Isobuthus
  - †Isobuthus pottsvillensis – type locality for species
- †Isochilina
  - †Isochilina subnodosa
- †Isorthis
  - †Isorthis arcuaria – or unidentified related form
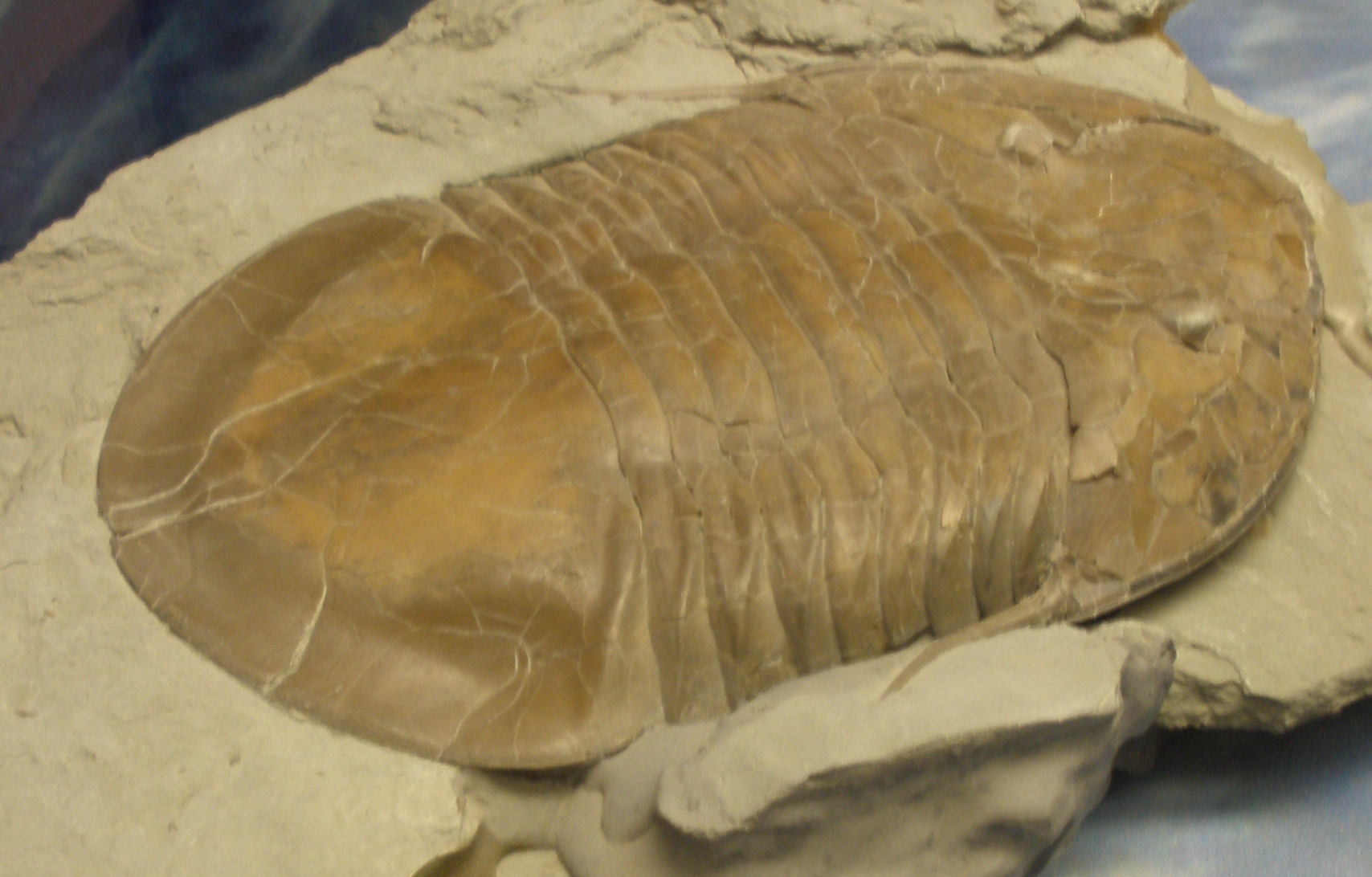
- Fossil of the Middle-Late Ordovician giant trilobite Isotelus.
  †Isotelus
  - †Isotelus gigas
  - †Isotelus maximus

== K ==
- †Kallimorphocrinus – type locality for genus
  - †Kallimorphocrinus astrus – type locality for species
- †Kalymma
  - †Kalymma lirata
- †Karinopteris
- †Kaskia
  - †Kaskia chesterensis
- †Kindbladia
- †Kindleoceras
  - †Kindleoceras cumingsi
  - †Kindleoceras equilaterale
  - †Kindleoceras rotundum
- †Kingstonia
- †Kionelasma
  - †Kionelasma coarticum
  - †Kionelasma conspicuum
  - †Kionelasma mammiferum
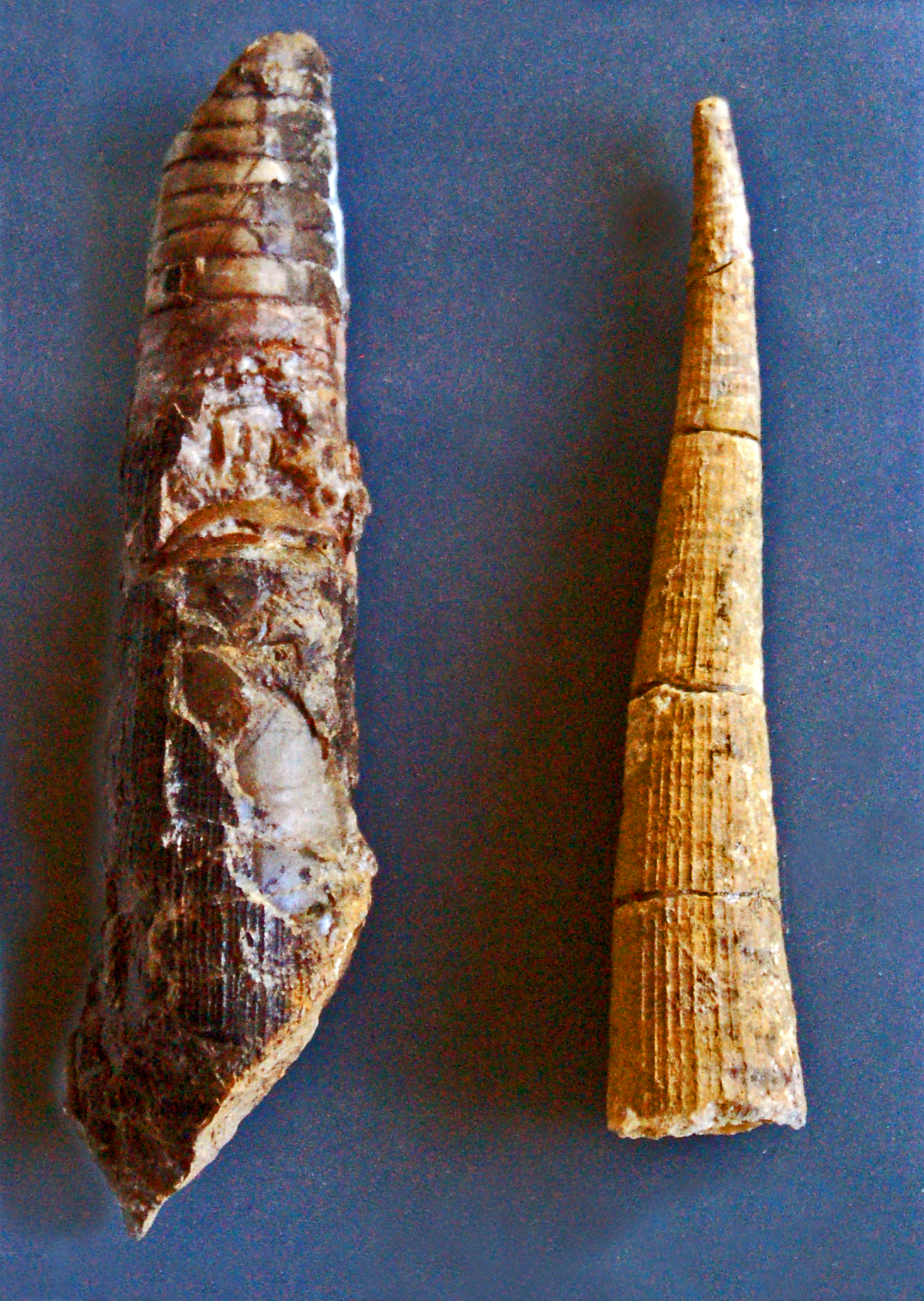
- Fossilized shells of the Middle Ordovician-Permian nautiloid cephalopod Kionoceras
  †Kionoceras
  - †Kionoceras bellense – or unidentified comparable form
  - †Kionoceras cancellatum
  - †Kionoceras delphiense
- †Kirkbya
  - †Kirkbya fernglenensis
  - †Kirkbya keiferi
- †Kirkbyella
  - †Kirkbyella annensis
- †Kirkidium
  - †Kirkidium knighti – or unidentified comparable form
  - †Kirkidium laqueatum
- †Knightites
- †Knoxina
- †Knoxisporites
  - †Knoxisporites rotatus
  - †Knoxisporites triradiatus
- †Kodonophyllum
  - †Kodonophyllum mulleri – or unidentified comparable form
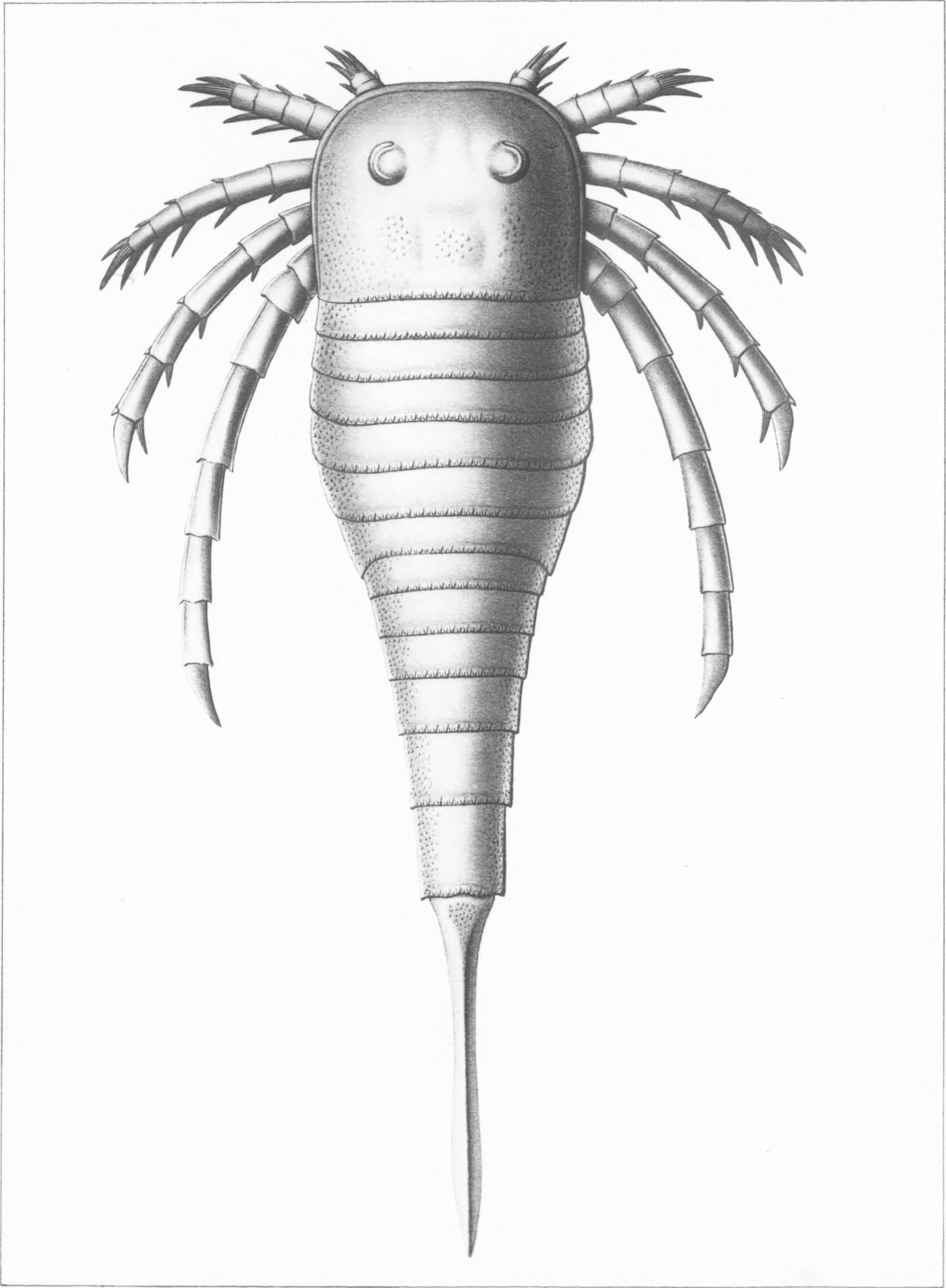
- Life restoration of the Silurian eurypterid ("sea scorpion") Kokomopterus
  †Kokomopterus
  - †Kokomopterus longicaudatus
- †Kosovopeltis

== L ==
- †Labechia
- †Laevigatosporites
  - †Laevigatosporites desmoinensis
  - †Laevigatosporites desmoinesensis
  - †Laevigatosporites globosus
  - †Laevigatosporites medius
  - †Laevigatosporites minutus
  - †Laevigatosporites ovalis
  - †Laevigatosporites punctatus
  - †Laevigatosporites vulgaris
- †Lambeoceras
  - †Lambeoceras richmondense
- †Lampadosocrinus
  - †Lampadosocrinus minutus
- †Langepis
  - †Langepis campbelli – type locality for species
- †Laurelocrinus
  - †Laurelocrinus gibbosus
  - †Laurelocrinus paulensis
  - †Laurelocrinus spinoradialis
  - †Laurelocrinus wilsoni
- †Leangella
- †Lebedictya
  - †Lebedictya crinita
- †Lebetocrinus
  - †Lebetocrinus grandis
- †Lecanocrinus
  - †Lecanocrinus elongatus
  - †Lecanocrinus pusillus
- †Lechritochoceras
  - †Lechritochoceras desplainense
- †Lecythiocrinus – tentative report
- †Leiorhynchus
  - †Leiorhynchus limitare
  - †Leiorhynchus quadricostatum
- †Leiotriletes
  - †Leiotriletes adnatoides
  - †Leiotriletes levis
  - †Leiotriletes notatus
- †Leodicites
  - †Leodicites imparilis – or unidentified related form
  - †Leodicites variedentatus
- †Lepadocystis
- †Leperditia
  - †Leperditia caecigena
  - †Leperditia caecigenia
- †Lepetopsis
  - †Lepetopsis levettei – type locality for species
- †Lepidocarpon
- †Lepidocyclus
  - †Lepidocyclus perlamellosum
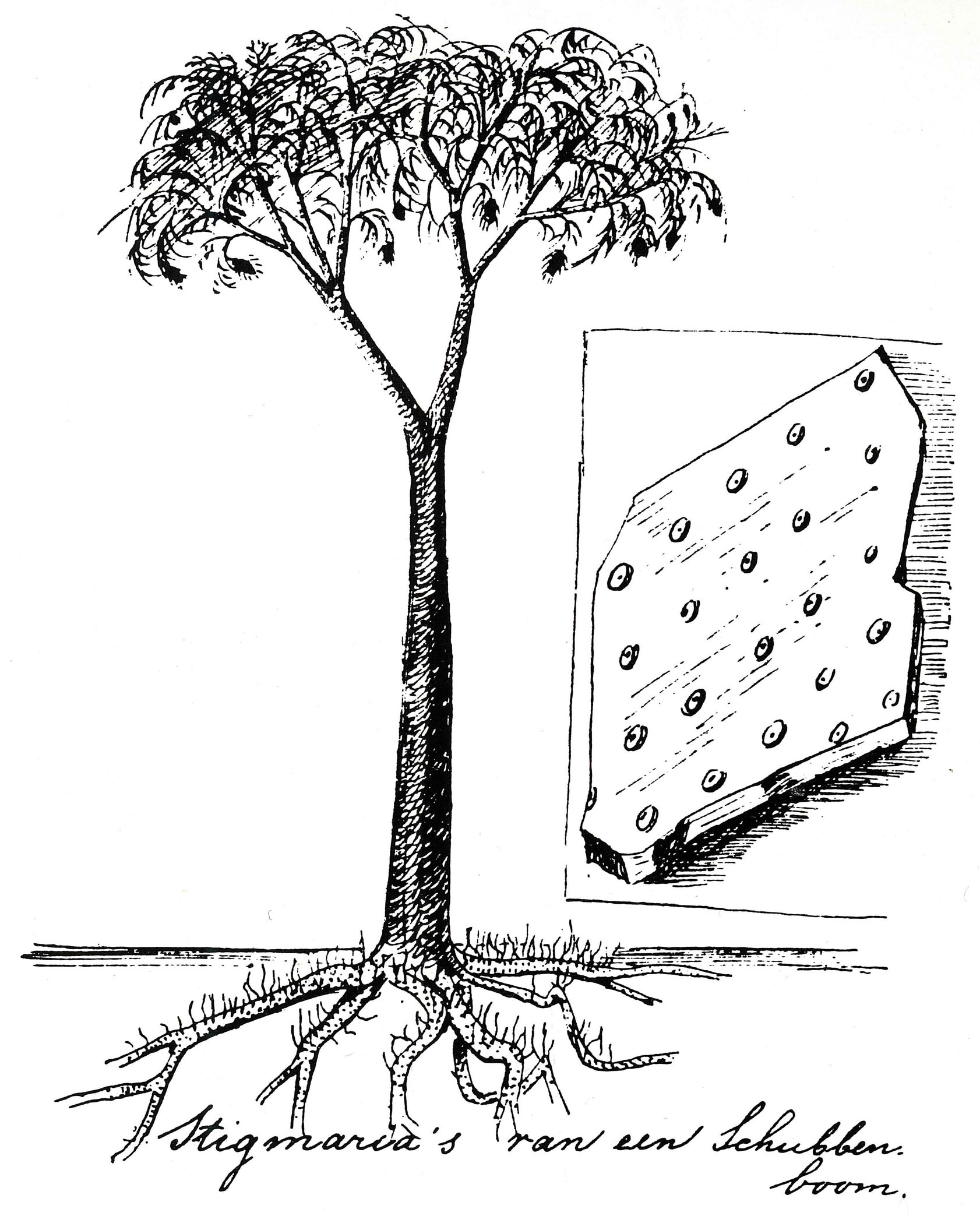
- Restoration of the Carboniferous-Late Triassic club moss relative Lepidodendron. Eli Heimans (1911).
  †Lepidodendron
  - †Lepidodendron aculeatum
  - †Lepidodendron baylense
  - †Lepidodendron dichotomum
  - †Lepidodendron hickii
  - †Lepidodendron lanceolatum – tentative report
  - †Lepidodendron latifolium
  - †Lepidodendron modulatum
  - †Lepidodendron obovatum
  - †Lepidodendron ophiurus
  - †Lepidodendron vestitum
  - †Lepidodendron wortheni
- †Lepidophloios
  - †Lepidophloios hallii
  - †Lepidophloios laricinus – or unidentified comparable form
- †Lepidophyllum
  - †Lepidophyllum longifolium
- †Lepidostrobophyllum
  - †Lepidostrobophyllum affine
  - †Lepidostrobophyllum ovatifolius
  - †Lepidostrobophyllum princeps – or unidentified comparable form
- †Lepidostrobus
  - †Lepidostrobus incertus – or unidentified comparable form
  - †Lepidostrobus variabilis
- †Leptaena
  - †Leptaena convexa
  - †Leptaena gibbosa
  - †Leptaena rhomboidalis
  - †Leptaena richmondensis
- †Leptoconocardium
  - †Leptoconocardium catastomum – type locality for species
- †Leptodesma
  - †Leptodesma rogersi
- †Leptotrypella
  - †Leptotrypella ohioensis
- †Lesueurilla
  - †Lesueurilla beloitensis
- †Lichas
  - †Lichas breviceps
- †Lichenalia
- †Liljevallospira
- †Limoptera
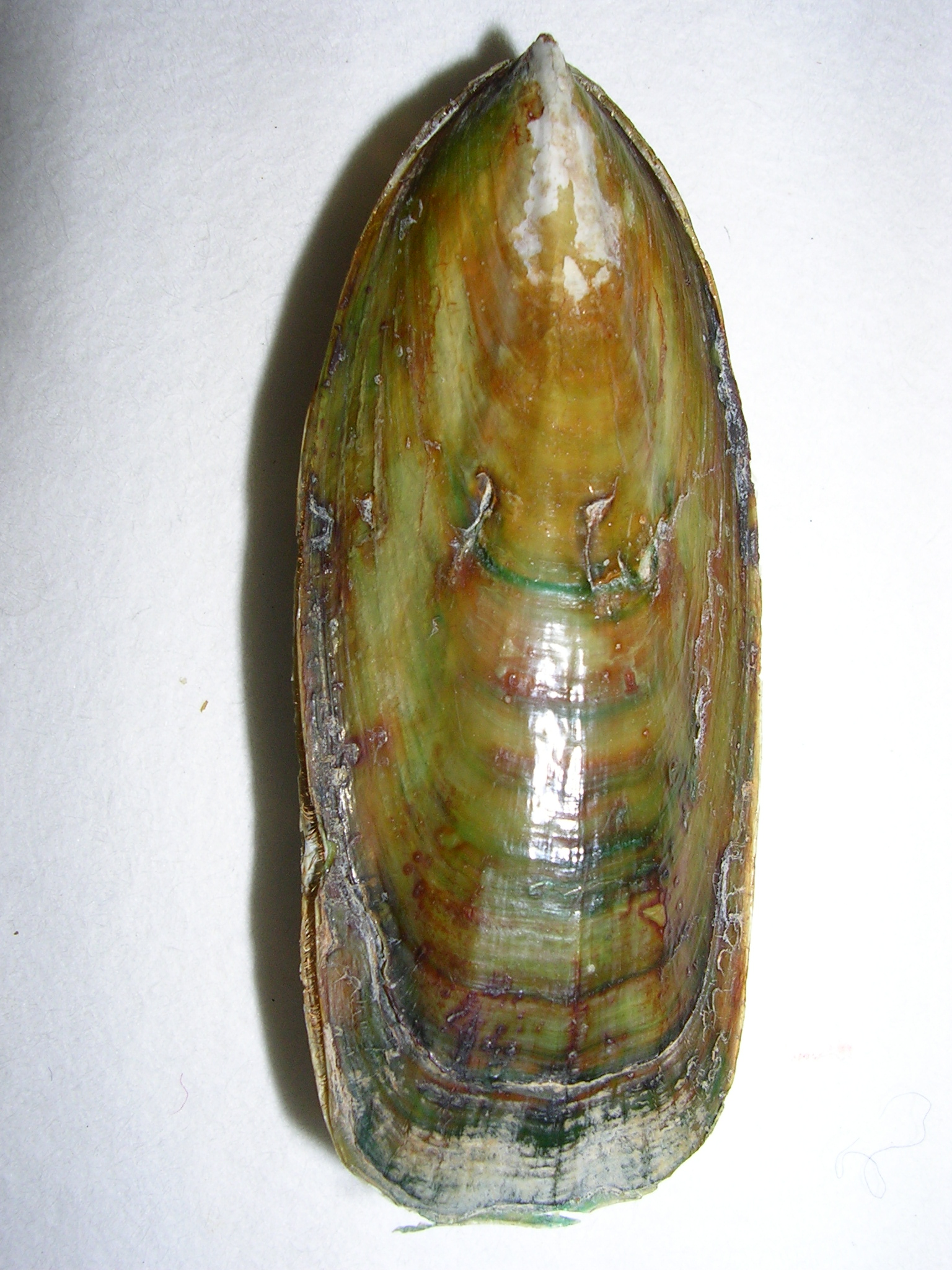
- Shell of the Cambrian-modern brachiopod Lingula
  †Lingula
  - †Lingula otheri
  - †Lingula spatulata
- †Lingulops
- †Linoproductus
  - †Linoproductus altonensis
  - †Linoproductus pileiformis
- †Linopteris
- †Liospira
  - †Liospira micula
  - †Liospira obtusa
  - †Liospira vitruvia
- †Lissatrypa
- †Litocrinus
- †Llanoaspis – tentative report
- †Lobatopteris
  - †Lobatopteris vestita – or unidentified comparable form
- †Lobomelocrinus
  - †Lobomelocrinus obconicus
- †Lophoblastus
  - †Lophoblastus inopinatus – or unidentified comparable form
- †Lophospira
  - †Lophospira milleri
  - †Lophospira perangulata
  - †Lophospira serrulata
  - †Lophospira ventricosa
- †Lophotriletes
  - †Lophotriletes commissuralis
  - †Lophotriletes pseudaculeatus
  - †Lophotriletes rarispinosus
- †Loxonema
- †Lumbriconerites
- †Lumectaster
  - †Lumectaster howelli
- †Lunulazona – tentative report
  - †Lunulazona springeri
- †Lycospora
  - †Lycospora granulata
  - †Lycospora micropapillata
  - †Lycospora noctuina
  - †Lycospora orbicula
  - †Lycospora paulula
  - †Lycospora pellucida
  - †Lycospora punctata
  - †Lycospora pusilla
  - †Lycospora rotunda
  - †Lycospora subjuga
- †Lyginorachis
  - †Lyginorachis dineuroides
- †Lyriocrinus
  - †Lyriocrinus melissa
- †Lyrodesma
  - †Lyrodesma major
- †Lyropora
  - †Lyropora devonica
- †Lyroporella
  - †Lyroporella divergens
- †Lysocystites
  - †Lysocystites sculptus
- †Lytospira
  - †Lytospira undulatus

== M ==
- †Macrocrinus
  - †Macrocrinus mundulus – tentative report
  - †Macrocrinus strotobasilaris
  - †Macrocrinus strotobasilarsis
- Macrocypris – tentative report
- †Macrostachya
  - †Macrostachya infundibuliformis
- †Macrostylocrinus
  - †Macrostylocrinus fasciatus
  - †Macrostylocrinus striatus
- †Manicrinus
  - †Manicrinus erectus
  - †Manicrinus hybocriniformis
- †Manitoulinoceras
  - †Manitoulinoceras erraticum
  - †Manitoulinoceras gyroforme
  - †Manitoulinoceras moderatum
- †Marginatia
  - †Marginatia burlingtonensis
  - †Marginatia crawfordsvillensis
- †Marginirugus
  - †Marginirugus magnus
- †Mariopteris
  - †Mariopteris hymenophylloides – tentative report
  - †Mariopteris mazoniana
  - †Mariopteris muricata
  - †Mariopteris nervosa
- †Marsupiocrinus
  - †Marsupiocrinus laurelensis
  - †Marsupiocrinus pauciornatus
  - †Marsupiocrinus turbinatus
- †Martinia
  - †Martinia contracta
- †Maurotarion
  - †Maurotarion christi
- †Mediospirifer
  - †Mediospirifer audaculus
- †Medullosa
- †Meekopora
  - †Meekopora eximia
- †Megakozlowskiella
  - †Megakozlowskiella sculptilis
- †Megalomphala
  - †Megalomphala crassa
- †Megalomus
  - †Megalomus canadensis
- †Megastrophia
  - †Megastrophia concava
  - †Megastrophia profunda
- †Megistocrinus
  - †Megistocrinus expansus
- †Melocrinites
  - †Melocrinites aequalis
  - †Melocrinites oblongus
- †Melonechinus
- †Mendacella
  - †Mendacella circulus
- †Meniscophyllum
  - †Meniscophyllum minutum
- †Menoeidina
- †Merista
  - †Merista nitida
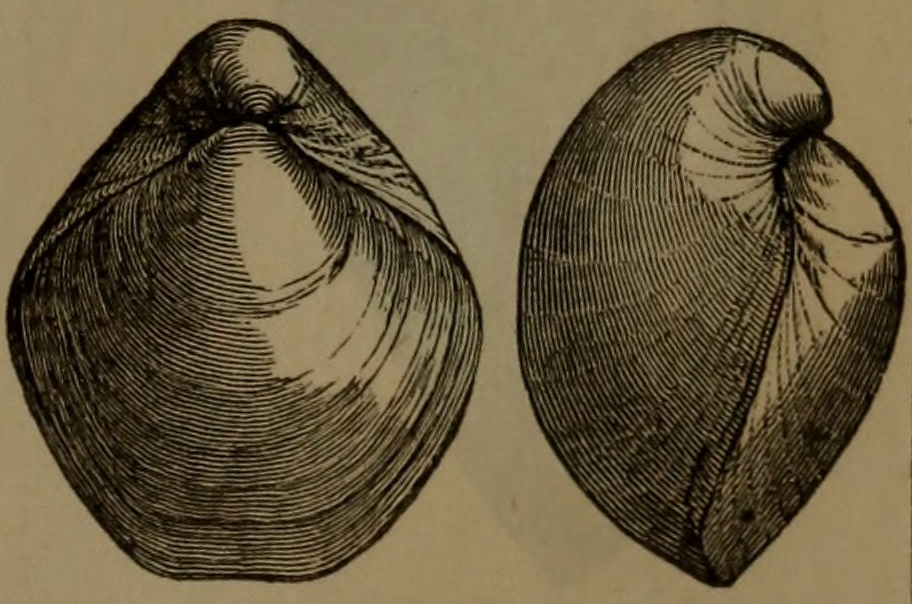
- Illustration (lower right, entry 15) of a fossilized shell in front and side views of the Silurian-Late Devonian brachiopod Meristella
  †Meristella
  - †Meristella nasuta
- †Meristina
  - †Meristina maria
  - †Meristina rectirostra
  - †Meristina rectirostris
- †Merocanites
- †Mesocyridira
  - †Mesocyridira bifurcata
  - †Mesocyridira flagrocosta
  - †Mesocyridira keokuk
  - †Mesocyridira pallaensis – or unidentified related form
  - †Mesocyridira pellaensis – or unidentified related form
  - †Mesocyridira washingtonensis
- †Mesoleptostrophia
- †Mesoneuron
  - †Mesoneuron simplex
- †Mesotrypa
- †Metriophyllum
  - †Metriophyllum deminutivum
- †Miamoceras
  - †Miamoceras shideleri
- †Michelinia
  - †Michelinia manucus
- †Microantyx
  - †Microantyx botoni – type locality for species
- †Microcheilinella
  - †Microcheilinella spinosa
- †Microplasma
- †Microreticulatisporites
  - †Microreticulatisporites nobilis
  - †Microreticulatisporites sulcatus
- †Mirocheilinella
- †Mixoneura – tentative report
  - †Mixoneura jenneyi
- †Modiolopsis
  - †Modiolopsis concentrica – tentative report
  - †Modiolopsis modiolaris
  - †Modiolopsis versaillesensis
- †Modiomorpha
  - †Modiomorpha concentrica
- †Monodechenella
  - †Monodechenella macrocephala
- †Monomorella
- †Monotrypa
  - †Monotrypa benjamini
  - †Monotrypa exserta
- †Monotrypella
  - †Monotrypella aequalis
- †Mooreisporites
  - †Mooreisporites inusitatus
- †Mooreoceras
  - †Mooreoceras chouteauense
  - †Mooreoceras indianense
- †Mourlonia
- †Mucophyllum
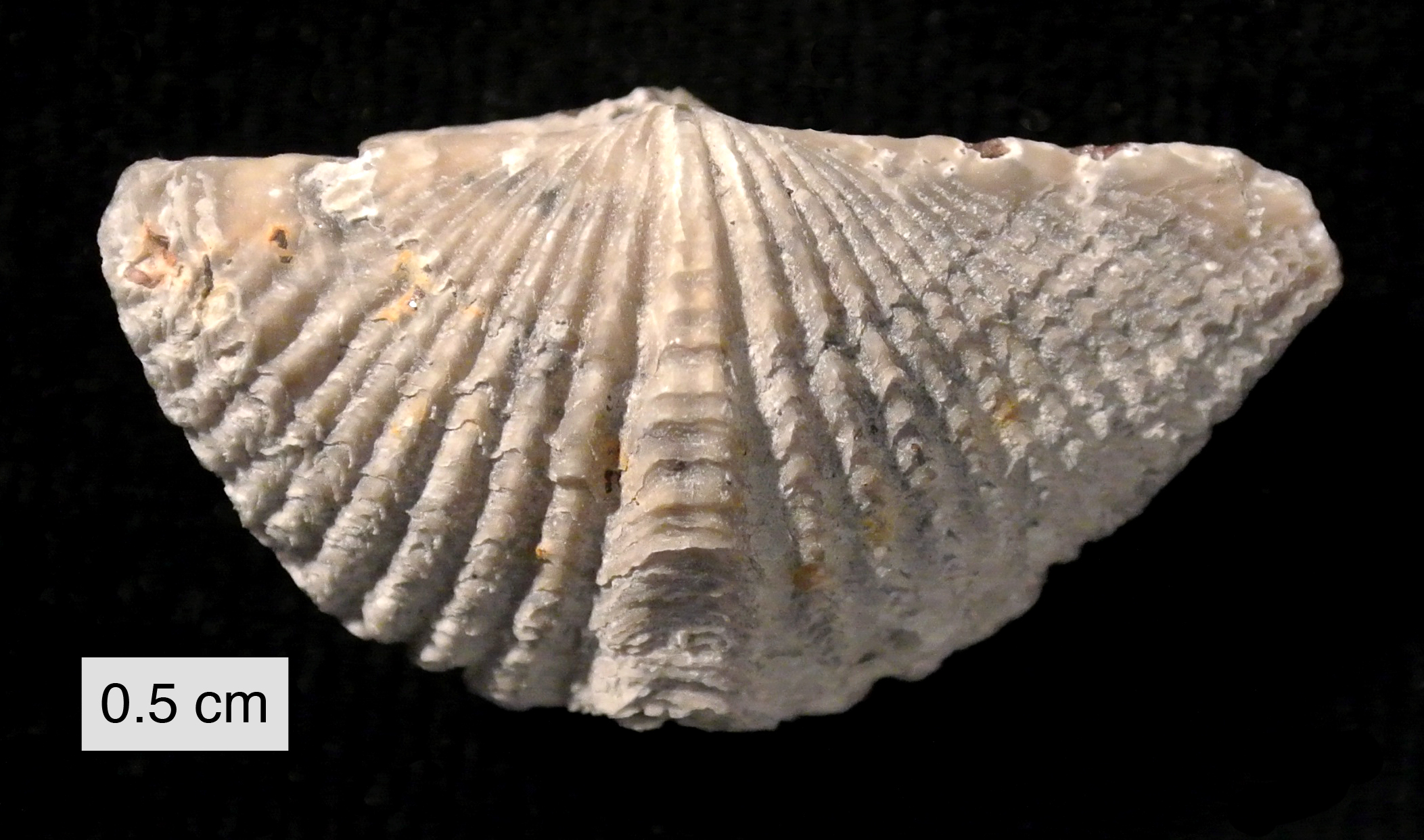
- Fossilized shell of the Devonian brachiopod Mucrospirifer
  †Mucrospirifer
  - †Mucrospirifer mucronatus
  - †Mucrospirifer profundus
  - †Mucrospirifer prolificus
- †Muensteroceras
  - †Muensteroceras oweni
  - †Muensteroceras parallelum
- †Mulceodens
  - †Mulceodens jaanussoni – or unidentified comparable form
- †Murchisonia
  - †Murchisonia laphami
  - †Murchisonia subulata
  - †Murchisonia vincta – type locality for species
- †Murchisonida
- †Myalina
  - †Myalina keokuk
- †Myelodactylus
  - †Myelodactylus ammonis
  - †Myelodactylus convolutus
- †Mysticocrinus

== N ==
- †Natica
  - †Natica littonana – type locality for species
- †Naticonema
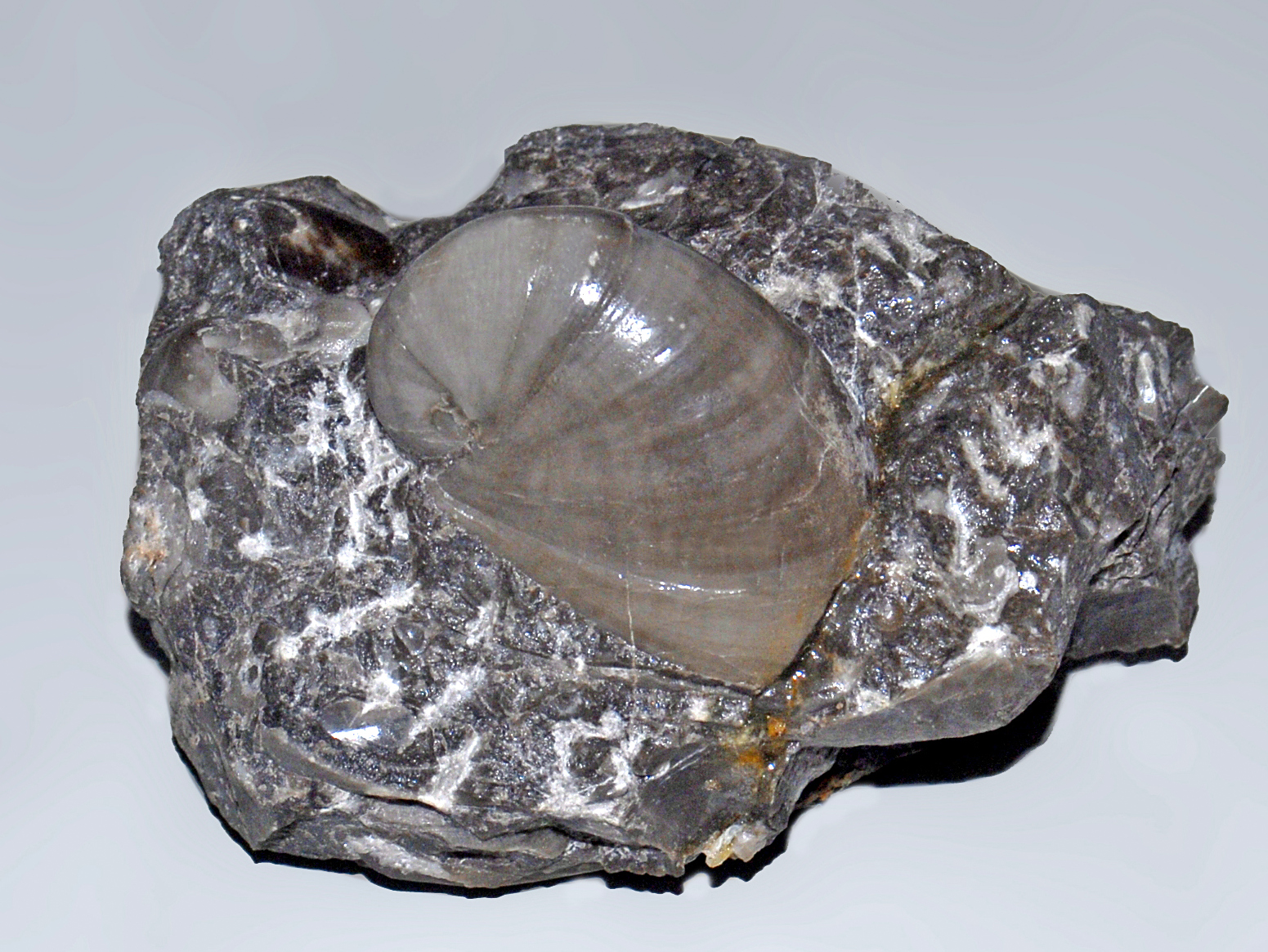
- Fossilized shell of the Early Devonian – Triassic sea snail Naticopsis
  †Naticopsis
  - †Naticopsis carleyana – type locality for species
  - †Naticopsis plebeia
- †Navispira
  - †Navispira kennethensis
- †Neilsonia
  - †Neilsonia insculpta – type locality for species
- †Nematopora
- †Neolageniocrinus
  - †Neolageniocrinus cassidus – type locality for species
- †Neopalaeaster
  - †Neopalaeaster crawfordsvillensis
- †Neozaphrentis
- †Nereidavis
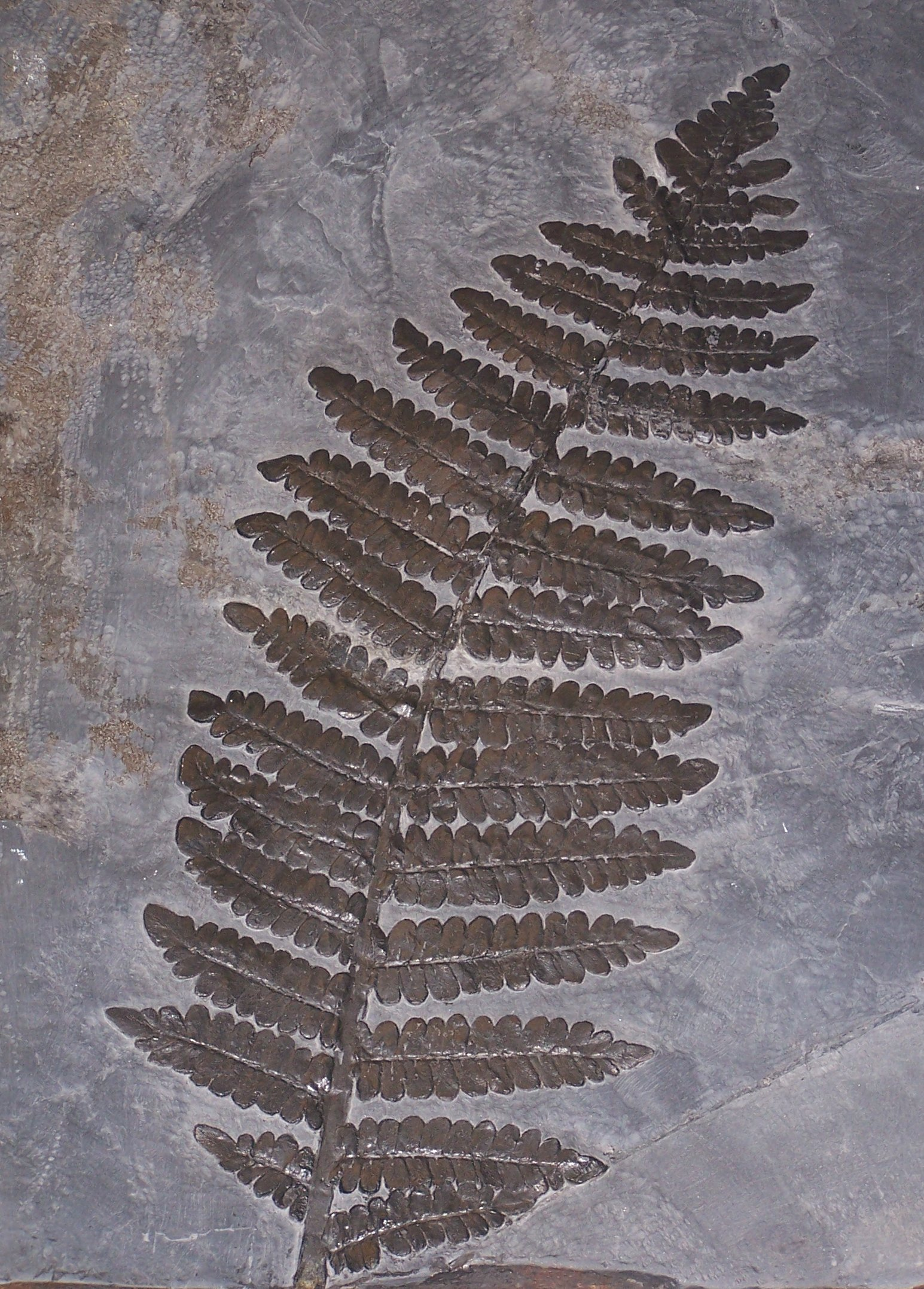
- Fossilized frond of the Carboniferous seed fern Neuropteris
  †Neuropteris
  - †Neuropteris fimbriata
  - †Neuropteris flexuosa
  - †Neuropteris heterophylla
  - †Neuropteris macrophylla
  - †Neuropteris obliqua
  - †Neuropteris ovata
  - †Neuropteris rarinervis
  - †Neuropteris scheuchzeri
  - †Neuropteris tenuifolia
  - †Neuropteris violetta
- †Nicklesopora
- †Nikiforovella
- †Nipterocrinus
  - †Nipterocrinus monroensis
- †Nucleocrinus
  - †Nucleocrinus angularis
- †Nucleospira
  - †Nucleospira concentrica – or unidentified comparable form
  - †Nucleospira concinna
  - †Nucleospira pisiformis
  - †Nucleospira rowleyi – or unidentified related form
- †Nucularca
  - †Nucularca cingulata
- †Nuculites
- †Nuculopsis
  - †Nuculopsis hians

== O ==
- †Odontophyllum
  - †Odontophyllum convergens
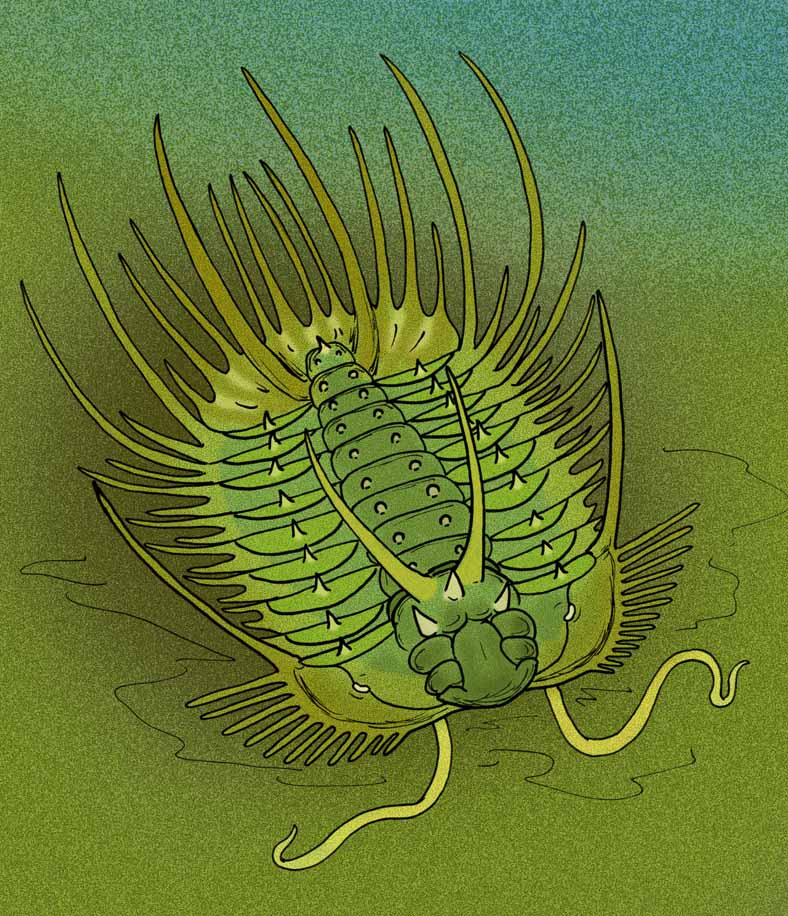
- Restoration of the Late Ordovician-Middle Devonian trilobite Odontopleura
  †Odontopleura – tentative report
- †Odontopteris
  - †Odontopteris subcuneata
- †Ohiocrinus
  - †Ohiocrinus brauni
- †Oligocarpia
  - †Oligocarpia missouriensis
- †Omospira
  - †Omospira alexandra – or unidentified comparable form
- †Omphalophloios
  - †Omphalophloios wagneri – type locality for species
- †Oncoceras
  - †Oncoceras anomalum
  - †Oncoceras duncanae
  - †Oncoceras exile
  - †Oncoceras insuetum
- †Onniella
  - †Onniella macerata
- †Onychaster
  - †Onychaster flexilis
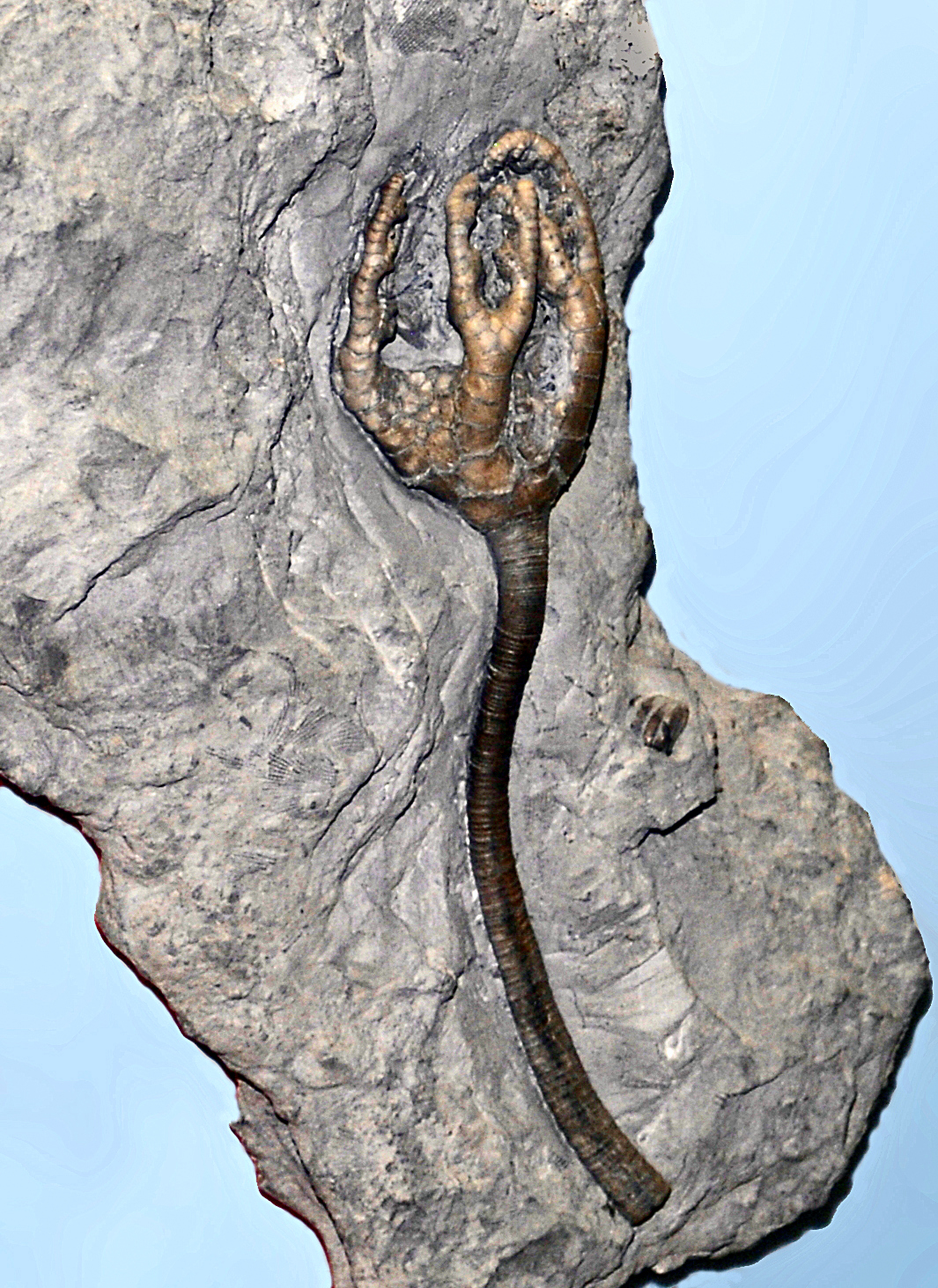
- Fossil of the Carboniferous crinoid ("sea lily") Onychocrinus
  †Onychocrinus
  - †Onychocrinus exculptus
  - †Onychocrinus exsculptus
  - †Onychocrinus pulaskiensis
  - †Onychocrinus ramulosus
- †Onychopterella
  - †Onychopterella kokomoensis
- †Oonoceras
  - †Oonoceras fennemani
  - †Oonoceras rejuvenatum
  - †Oonoceras shideleri
- †Ophiletina
  - †Ophiletina sublaxa
- †Opisthoptera
  - †Opisthoptera casei
- †Orbiculoidea
  - †Orbiculoidea keokuk
  - †Orbiculoidea lodiensis
- †Oriostoma
  - †Oriostoma globosum – or unidentified comparable form
  - †Oriostoma hoyi
- †Ornithoprion – type locality for genus
  - †Ornithoprion hertwigi – type locality for species
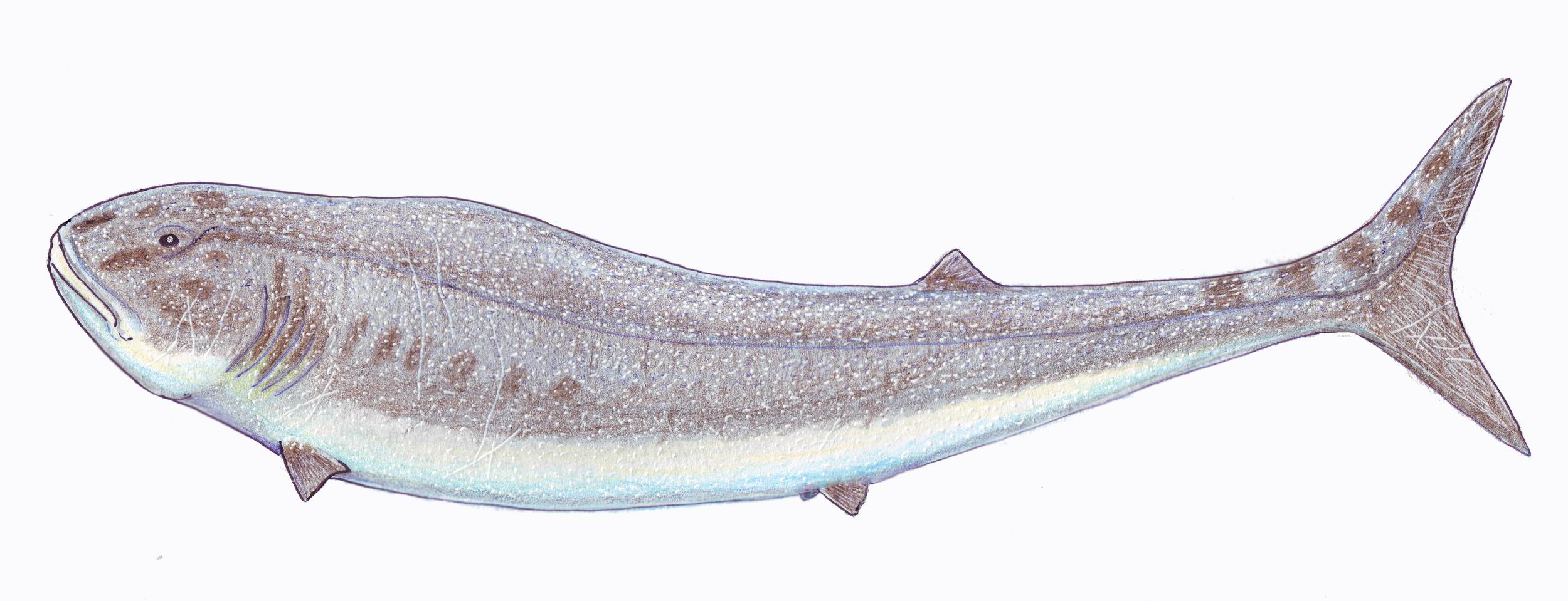
- Restoration of the Carboniferous-Permian cartilaginous fish Orodus
  †Orodus
  - †Orodus greggi – type locality for species
  - †Orodus micropterygius – type locality for species
- †Orthis
  - †Orthis biforata
  - †Orthis pyramidalis
- †Orthodesma
  - †Orthodesma curvatum
- †Orthonybyoceras
  - †Orthonybyoceras dyeri
- †Orthonychia
  - †Orthonychia conicum
- †Orthopleura
- †Orthostrophia
  - †Orthostrophia fissistriata
- †Orthotetes
  - †Orthotetes kaskaskiensis
  - †Orthotetes keokuk
- †Ortonella
  - †Ortonella hainesi
- †Osgoodicystis
  - †Osgoodicystis biessetti
  - †Osgoodicystis cooperi
  - †Osgoodicystis wykoffi
- †Otarion
  - †Otarion niagarensis
- †Ovatia
  - †Ovatia ovata – tentative report
  - †Ovatia ovatus
- †Oxyprora
  - †Oxyprora carinatum – type locality for species

== P ==
- †Pachydictya
  - †Pachydictya crassa
- †Pachylocrinus
  - †Pachylocrinus aequalis
  - †Pachylocrinus briareus
  - †Pachylocrinus gibsoni
- †Pachytesta
  - †Pachytesta vera – or unidentified comparable form
- †Palaeacis
  - †Palaeacis enormis
- †Palaeocapulus
  - †Palaeocapulus acutirostre
  - †Palaeocapulus equilateralis
- †Palaeoconcha
  - †Palaeoconcha faberi
- †Palaeoneilo
  - †Palaeoneilo sulcatina
  - †Palaeoneilo truncata
- †Palaeostachya
  - †Palaeostachya elongata
- †Paleofavosites – tentative report
  - †Paleofavosites prolificus
- †Paleospora
  - †Paleospora fragila
- †Paleostachya
- †Paliphyllum
  - †Paliphyllum suecicum brassfieldense
- †Palmatolepis
  - †Palmatolepis linguiformis
  - †Palmatolepis pseudofoliatus
  - †Palmatolepis timorenis
- †Palmatopteris
  - †Palmatopteris furcata
- †Paolia – type locality for genus
  - †Paolia vetusta – type locality for species
- †Paoliola
  - †Paoliola gurleyi – type locality for species
- †Paracolocrinus
  - †Paracolocrinus paradoxicus
- †Paraconularia
  - †Paraconularia chesterensis – tentative report
  - †Paraconularia crawfordsvillensis
- †Paracyclas
  - †Paracyclas occidentalis
  - †Paracyclas proavia
- †Paradichocrinus
  - †Paradichocrinus planus
  - †Paradichocrinus polydactylus
- †Paragazacrinus
  - †Paragazacrinus rotundus
- †Parallelodon
  - †Parallelodon obsoletus – tentative report
  - †Parallelodon tenuistriatus
- †Paralycopodites
  - †Paralycopodites brevifolius
- †Paraparchites
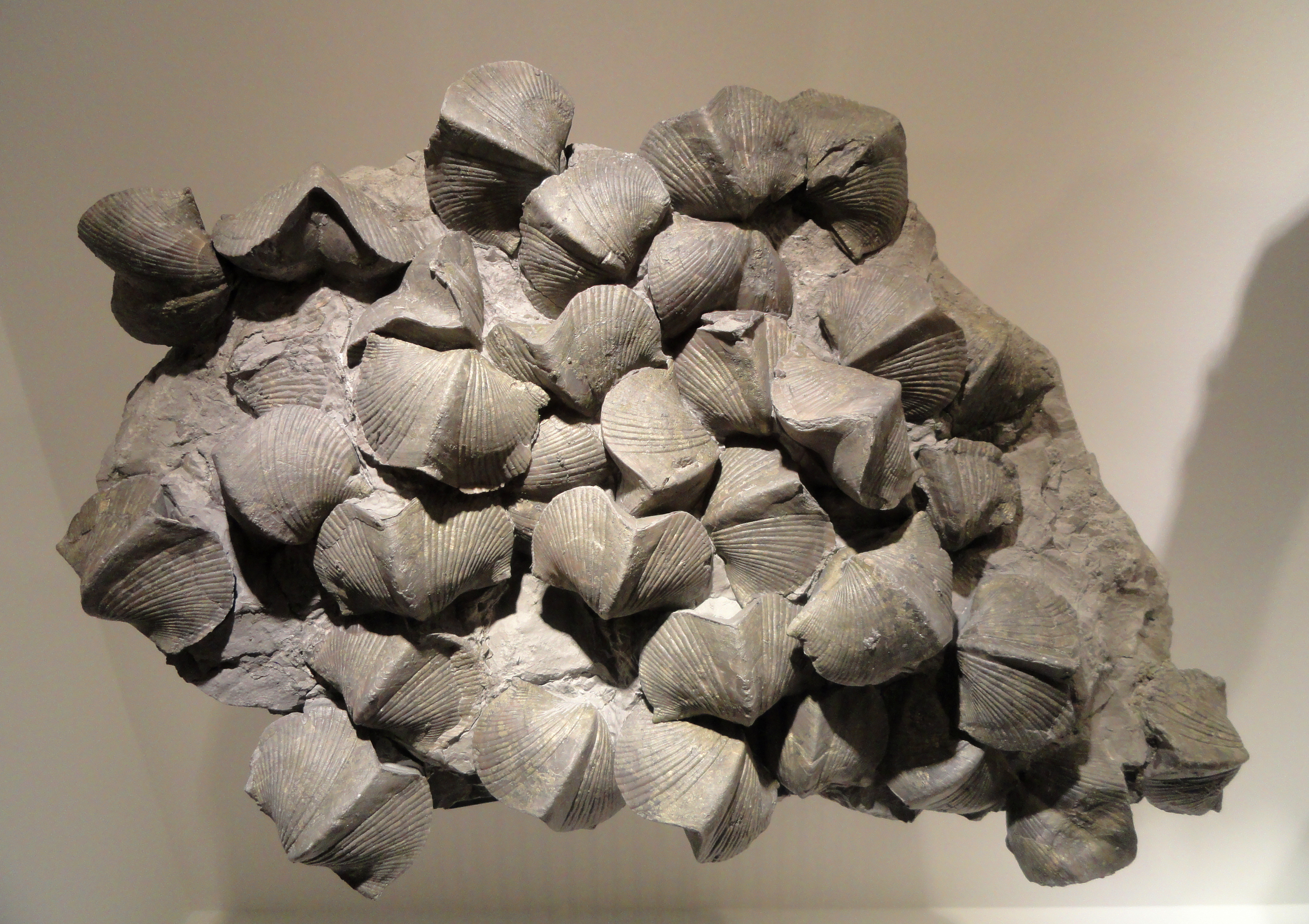
- Assemblage of the Early-Middle Devonian brachiopod Paraspirifer
  †Paraspirifer
  - †Paraspirifer acuminatus
- †Parazyga
  - †Parazyga hirsuta
- †Parichthyocrinus
  - †Parichthyocrinus crawfordsvillensis
  - †Parichthyocrinus meeki
- †Parisocrinus
  - †Parisocrinus crawfordsvillensis
- †Parvohallopora
  - †Parvohallopora ramosa
- †Passalocrinus
  - †Passalocrinus triangularis
- †Patelliocrinus
  - †Patelliocrinus indianensis
  - †Patelliocrinus laevis
  - †Patelliocrinus ornatus
  - †Patelliocrinus rugosus
- †Paulicystis
  - †Paulicystis densus
  - †Paulicystis sparsus
- †Paulocrinus
  - †Paulocrinus biturbinatus
- †Paupospira
  - †Paupospira bowdeni
  - †Paupospira moorei – type locality for species
  - †Paupospira tropidophora
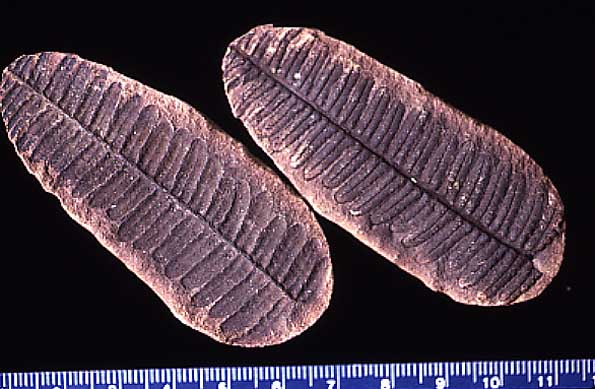
- Fossils of the Late Devonian-Permian fern-like fronds Pecopteris
  †Pecopteris
  - †Pecopteris cisti
  - †Pecopteris clintoni
  - †Pecopteris miltonii
  - †Pecopteris polymorpha
  - †Pecopteris pseudovestita – tentative report
  - †Pecopteris serpillifolia – tentative report
  - †Pecopteris squamosa
- †Pelagiella
- †Pellecrinus
  - †Pellecrinus hexadactylus
- †Pemtremites
  - †Pemtremites patei
- †Penniretepora
- †Pennsylvanioxylon
  - †Pennsylvanioxylon nauertianum
- †Pentacystis
  - †Pentacystis gibsoni
  - †Pentacystis wykoffi
- †Pentagonia
  - †Pentagonia biplicata
- †Pentamerella
  - †Pentamerella arata
  - †Pentamerella pavilionensis
- †Pentameroceras
  - †Pentameroceras cumingsi
- †Pentamerus
  - †Pentamerus fornicata
  - †Pentamerus oblungus
- †Pentaramicrinus
  - †Pentaramicrinus bimagnaramus
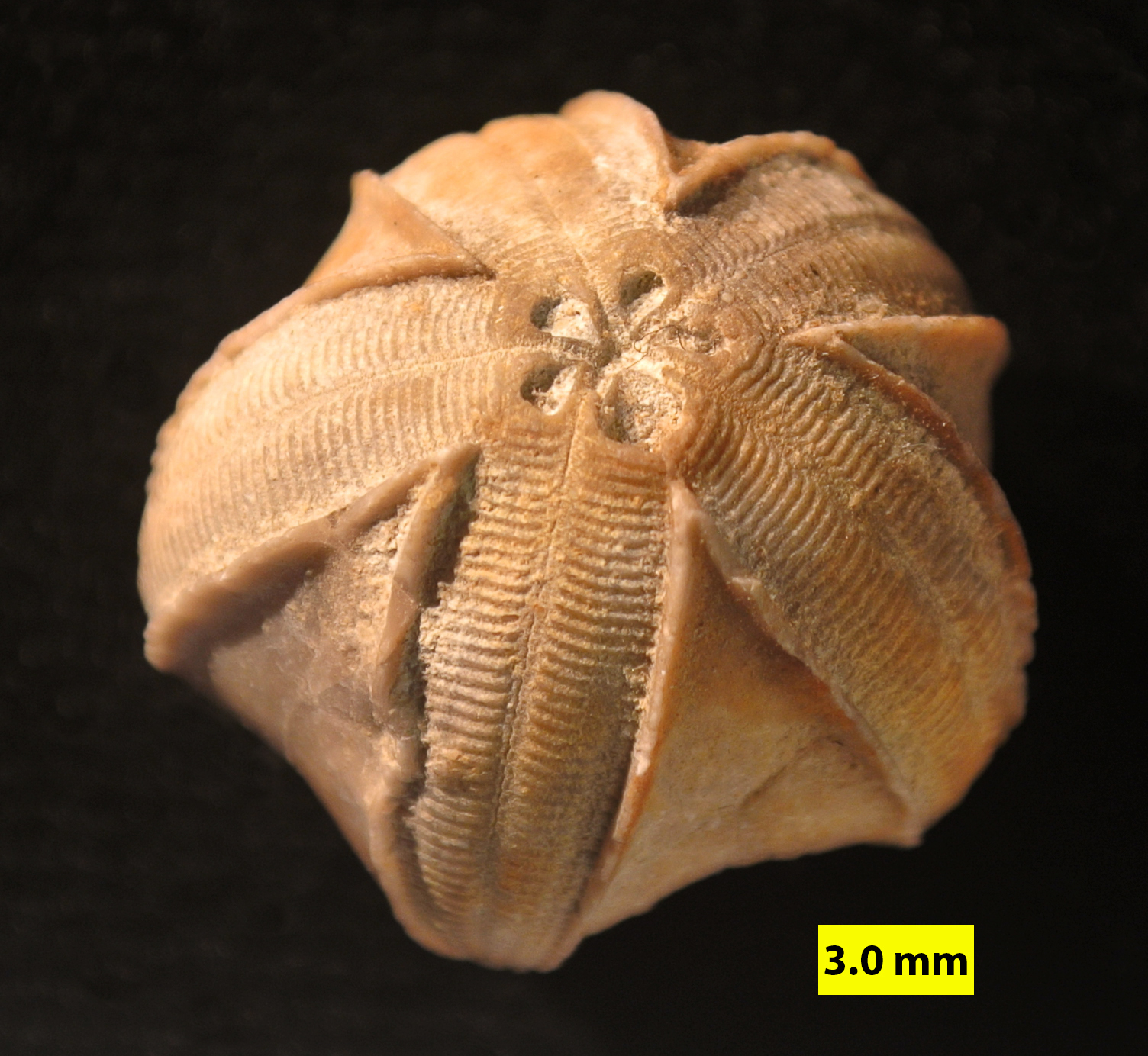
- Fossilized theca of the Carboniferous blastoid echinoderm ("sea bud") Pentremites
  †Pentremites
  - †Pentremites abruptus
  - †Pentremites angularis
  - †Pentremites buttsi
  - †Pentremites clavatus
  - †Pentremites conoideus
  - †Pentremites elegans
  - †Pentremites girtyi
  - †Pentremites halli
  - †Pentremites hambachi
  - †Pentremites maccalliei
  - †Pentremites okawensis
  - †Pentremites patei
  - †Pentremites platybasis
  - †Pentremites pyramidatus
  - †Pentremites pyriformis
  - †Pentremites robustus
  - †Pentremites springeri
  - †Pentremites symmetricus
  - †Pentremites tulilpaformis
  - †Pentremites tulipaformis
  - †Pentremites welleri
- †Pentremitidea – tentative report
  - †Pentremitidea approximata
- †Perditocardinia
  - †Perditocardinia dubia
- †Periastron
  - †Periastron perforatum
  - †Periastron reticulatum
- †Pericyclus
- †Periechocrinites
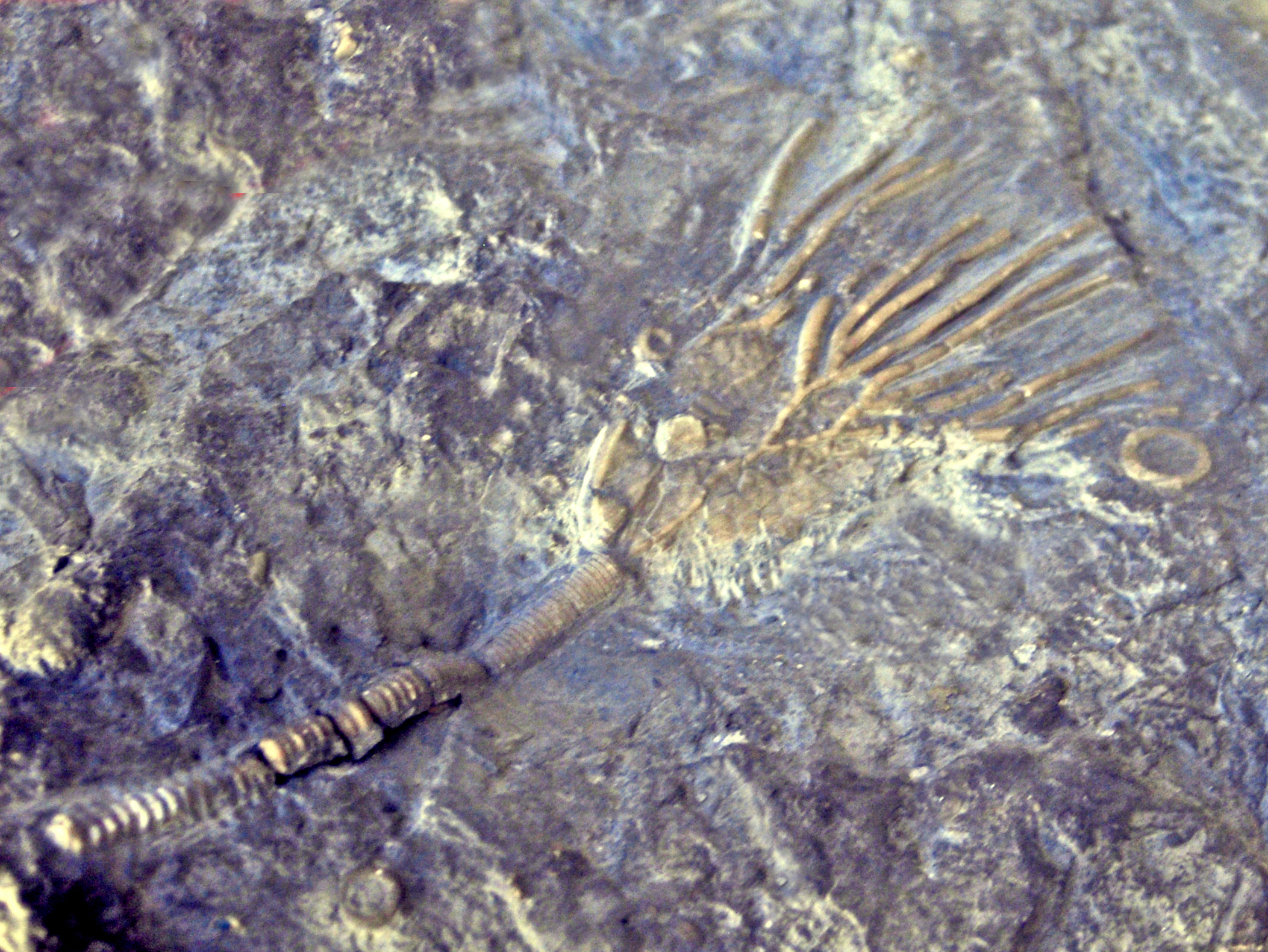
- Fossil of the Silurian-Carboniferous crinoid ("sea lily") Periechocrinus
  †Periechocrinus
  - †Periechocrinus umbrosus
- †Peronopora
  - †Peronopora decipiens
- †Petalocrinus
  - †Petalocrinus inferior
  - †Petalocrinus longus
- †Petigopora
- †Petrocrania
  - †Petrocrania scabiosa
- †Phacelocrinus
  - †Phacelocrinus longidactylus
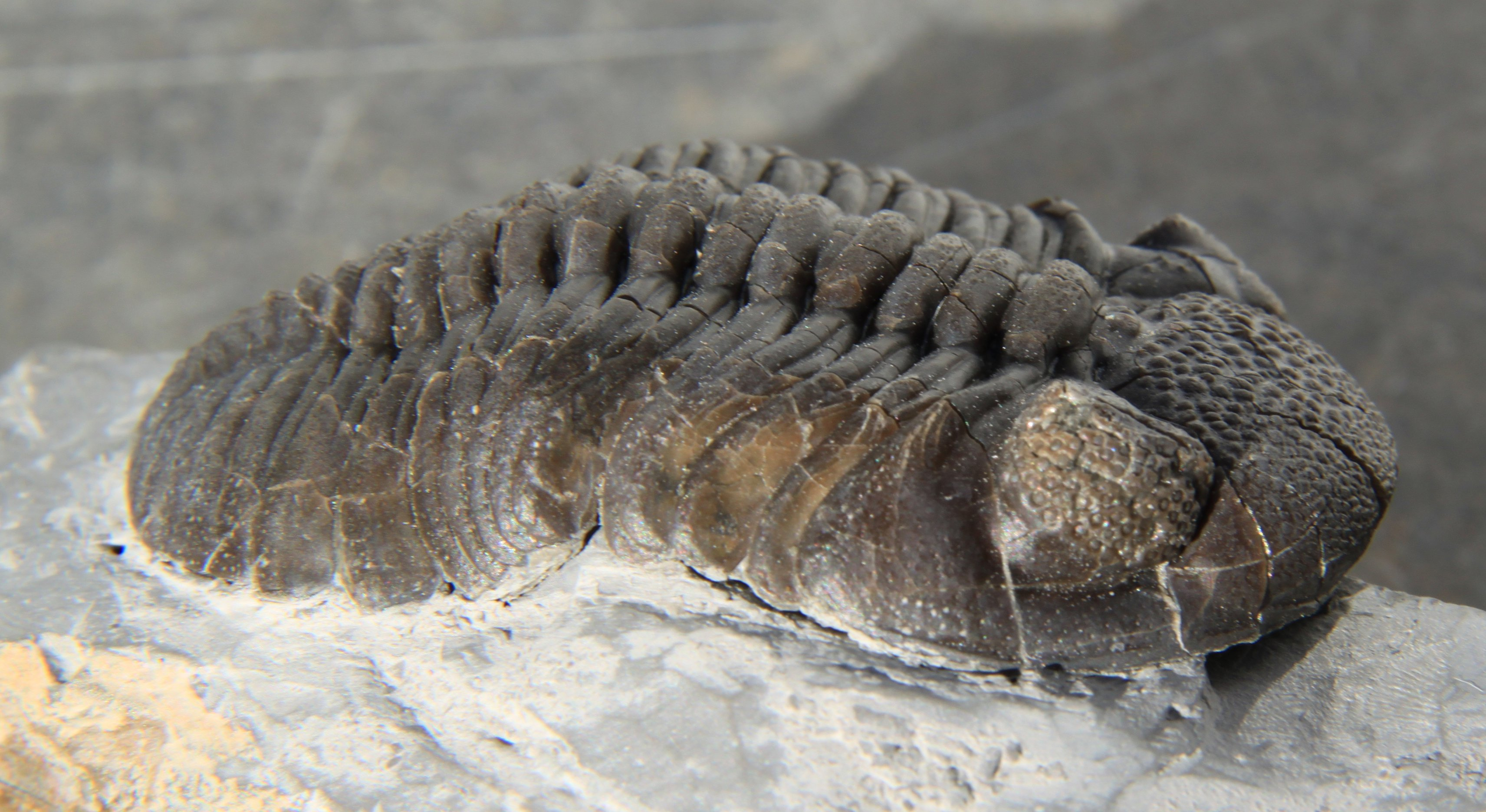
- Fossil of the Late Ordovician-Late Devonian trilobite Phacops
  †Phacops
- †Phaenopora
  - †Phaenopora ensiformis
- †Phaenoschisma
- †Phanocrinus
  - †Phanocrinus formosus
  - †Phanocrinus parvaramus
- †Phestia
- †Philhedra
  - †Philhedra crenistriata
  - †Philhedra laelia
  - †Philhedra stewarti
- †Phillipsia
  - †Phillipsia bufi
  - †Phillipsia bufo
- †Phimocrinus – report made of unidentified related form or using admittedly obsolete nomenclature
- †Pholadomorpha
  - †Pholadomorpha pholadiformis
- †Pholidops – report made of unidentified related form or using admittedly obsolete nomenclature
- †Pholidostrophia
  - †Pholidostrophia iowaensis
- †Phosphannulus
- †Phractopora
- †Phragmoceras
  - †Phragmoceras parvum
- †Phragmodictya
  - †Phragmodictya catilliforme
- †Phragmolites
  - †Phragmolites dyeri
  - †Phragmolites triangularis
- †Phymatophyllum
  - †Phymatophyllum multiplicatum
- †Physospongia
  - †Physospongia colletti
  - †Physospongia dawsoni
- †Pietzschia
  - †Pietzschia polyupsilon
- †Pinna
  - †Pinna subspatulata
- †Pinnularia
- †Pisocrinus
  - †Pisocrinus benedicti – or unidentified comparable form
  - †Pisocrinus campana
  - †Pisocrinus gemmiformis
  - †Pisocrinus gorbyi
  - †Pisocrinus quinquelobus
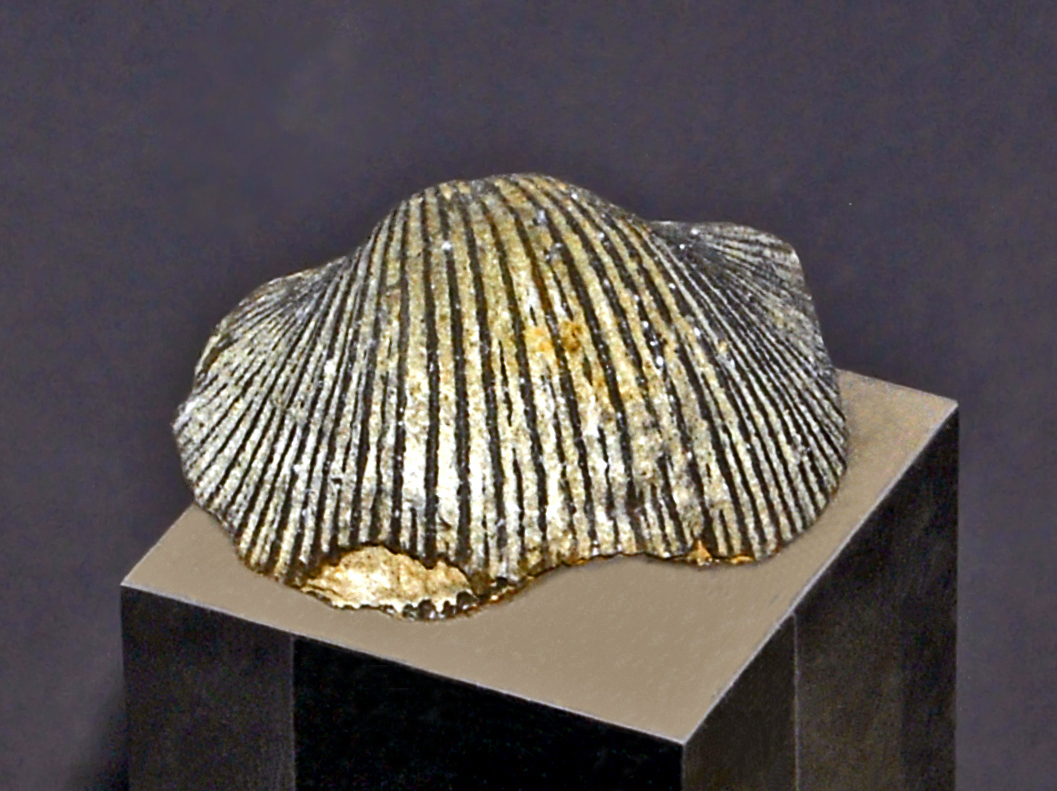
- Fossilized shell of the Ordovician brachiopod Plaesiomys
  †Plaesiomys
  - †Plaesiomys subquadrata
  - †Plaesiomys subquatra
- †Planalvus – tentative report
  - †Planalvus densa
- †Plasmopora
  - †Plasmopora follis
- †Platyaxum
  - †Platyaxum alicornis
  - †Platyaxum foliatum
  - †Platyaxum orthosoleniskum
  - †Platyaxum undosum
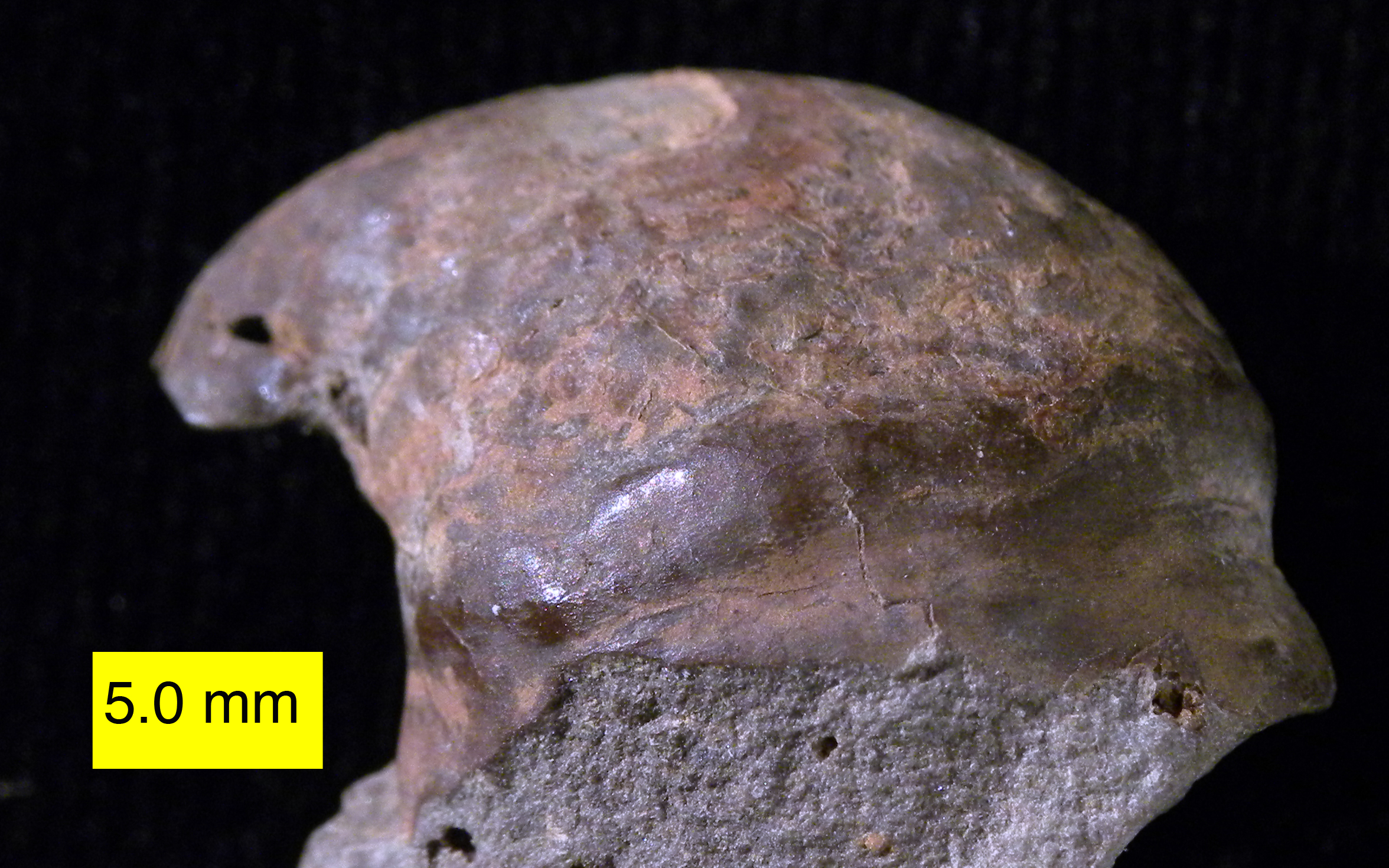
- Fossilized shell of the Silurian-Early Triassic sea snail Platyceras
  †Platyceras
  - †Platyceras argo – tentative report
  - †Platyceras brownsportense
  - †Platyceras bucculentum
  - †Platyceras clintonensis
  - †Platyceras cornutum – or unidentified comparable form
  - †Platyceras crassum
  - †Platyceras daytonense
  - †Platyceras echinatum
  - †Platyceras erectum
  - †Platyceras lineatum
  - †Platyceras niagarense
  - †Platyceras niagarensis
  - †Platyceras plebium
- †Platycrinites
  - †Platycrinites bonoensis
  - †Platycrinites hemispericus
  - †Platycrinites hemisphericus
  - †Platycrinites nodostriatus
  - †Platycrinites saffordi
  - †Platycrinites safordi
- †Platycrinus
- †Platyrachella
  - †Platyrachella macbridei
  - †Platyrachella oweni
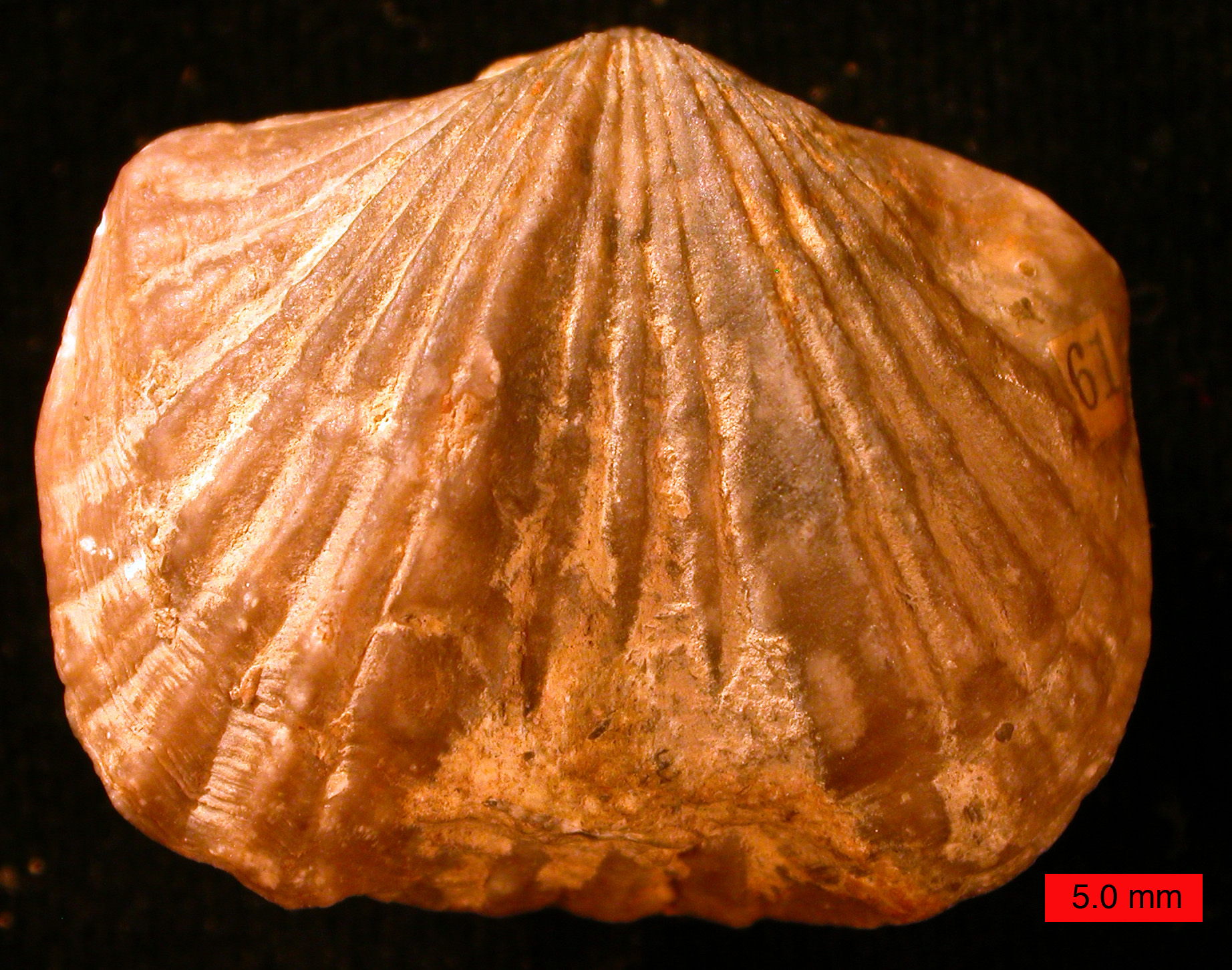
- Fossilized shell of the Middle Ordovician-Silurian brachiopod Platystrophia
  †Platystrophia
  - †Platystrophia acutilirata
  - †Platystrophia annieana
  - †Platystrophia attenuata
  - †Platystrophia biforata – or unidentified comparable form
  - †Platystrophia clarksvillensis
  - †Platystrophia cummingsi
  - †Platystrophia cypha
  - †Platystrophia daytonensis
  - †Platystrophia elkhornensis
  - †Platystrophia foerstei
  - †Platystrophia hopensis
  - †Platystrophia laticosta
  - †Platystrophia moritura
  - †Platystrophia ponderosa
- †Platyzona
  - †Platyzona trilineata – type locality for species
- †Pleapopleurus
  - †Pleapopleurus tenuicostatus
  - †Pleapopleurus tenuicostus
- †Pleapopluerus
  - †Pleapopluerus tenuicostatus – tentative report
- †Plectatrypa
- †Plectodonta
  - †Plectodonta elegantula
  - †Plectodonta transversalis
- †Plectorthis
  - †Plectorthis plicatella
- †Plectospira
  - †Plectospira sexplicata
- †Plectospirifer
- †Pleurocornu
  - †Pleurocornu amissum – or unidentified comparable form
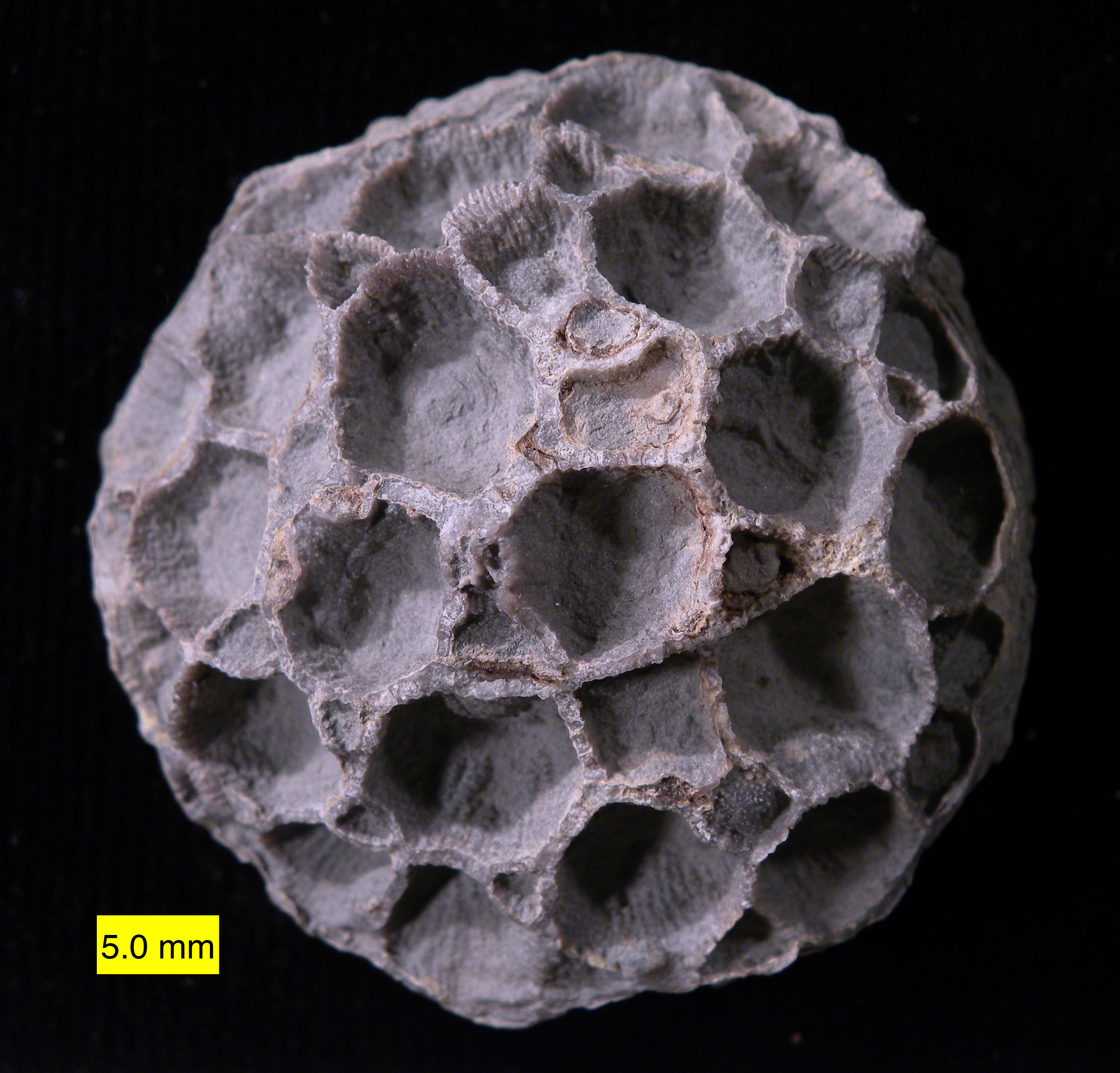
- Fossil of the Silurian-Carboniferous tabulate coral Pleurodictyum
  †Pleurodictyum
  - †Pleurodictyum cornu
  - †Pleurodictyum cylindricum
  - †Pleurodictyum insigne
  - †Pleurodictyum maximum
  - †Pleurodictyum michelinoidea
  - †Pleurodictyum papillosa
  - †Pleurodictyum planum
  - †Pleurodictyum speciosus
  - †Pleurodictyum spiculata
  - †Pleurodictyum wardi
- †Pleuronotus
  - †Pleuronotus decewi
- †Pleurorthoceras
  - †Pleurorthoceras clarksvillense
- †Poleumita
  - †Poleumita scamnata
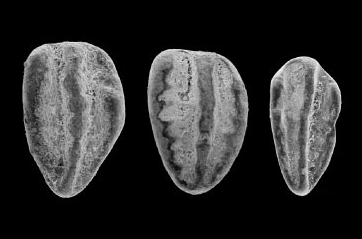
- Various conodont elements of Polygnathus
  †Polygnathus
- †Polypora
  - †Polypora corticosa
  - †Polypora multispinosa
  - †Polypora nodolinearis
- †Polysacos – type locality for genus
  - †Polysacos vickersianum – type locality for species
- †Polytryphocycloides
- †Polyxylon
  - †Polyxylon elegans
- †Portlockiella
- †Poterioceras – tentative report
- †Poteriocrinites
  - †Poteriocrinites amplus – type locality for species
- †Potonieisporites
  - †Potonieisporites elegans
- †Prasopora
  - †Prasopora hospitalis
- Priscopedatus
- †Prismopora
  - †Prismopora serrulata
- †Pristiograptus
  - †Pristiograptus jaegeri
- †Probillingsites
- Proboscina
- †Prodromites
  - †Prodromites gorbyi
- †Productus
  - †Productus cestriensis
  - †Productus fasiculatus
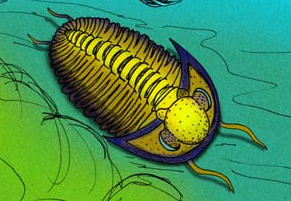
- Restoration of the Silurian trilobite Proetus
  †Proetus
  - †Proetus crassimarginatus
  - †Proetus folliceps
- †Prolecanites
  - †Prolecanites lyoni
- †Prolecythiocrinus
  - †Prolecythiocrinus problematicus
- †Promexyele
  - †Promexyele bairdi
  - †Promexyele peyeri – type locality for species
- †Propora
  - †Propora exigua
- †Prosolarium
  - †Prosolarium crenulata
- †Protaraea
  - †Protaraea richmondensis
- †Protatrypa
  - †Protatrypa marginalis
- †Proteonina
  - †Proteonina cumberlandiae
- †Protocalamites
  - †Protocalamites dorfii
- †Protocanites
- †Protochonetes – tentative report
- †Protokoinoceras
  - †Protokoinoceras medullare
- †Protolepidodendron
  - †Protolepidodendron microphyllum
- †Protoleptostrophia
  - †Protoleptostrophia perplana
- †Protomegastrophia
- †Protoniella
  - †Protoniella parva – or unidentified related form
- †Protophragmoceras
  - †Protophragmoceras hercules
- †Protosalvinia
  - †Protosalvinia rarenna
- Psammosphaera
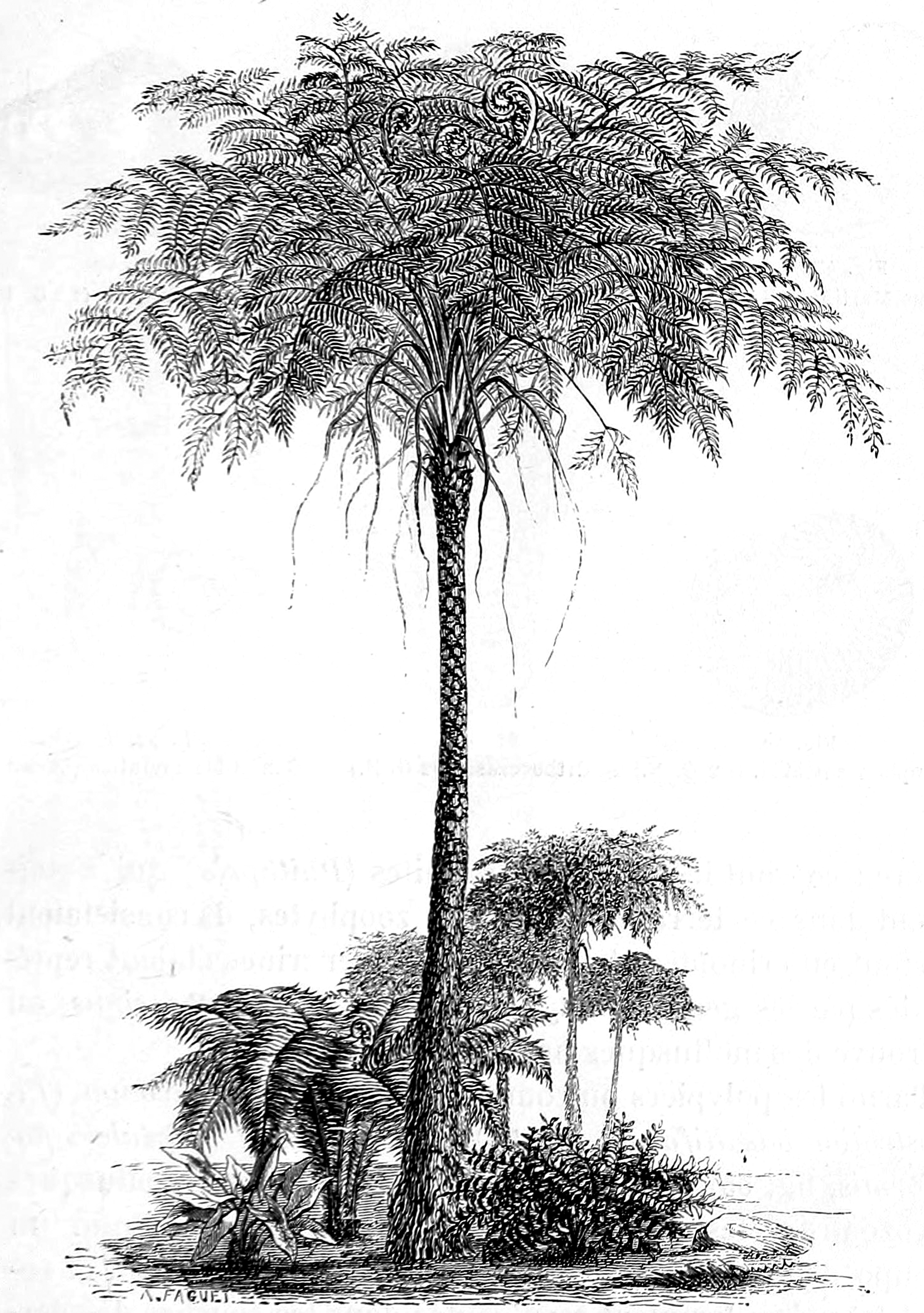
- Life restoration of the Devonian-Permian tree fern Psaronius. Auguste Faguet (1877).
  †Psaronius
- †Pseudagnostus
- †Pseudastrorhiza
  - †Pseudastrorhiza conica
- †Pseudaviculopecten
  - †Pseudaviculopecten indianensis
- †Pseudoatrypa
  - †Pseudoatrypa devoniana
- †Pseudobythocypris
- †Pseudocolpomya
  - †Pseudocolpomya elongata
- †Pseudolingula
- †Pseudostrohiza
  - †Pseudostrohiza delicata
- †Pseudosyrinx
  - †Pseudosyrinx gigas
- †Pseudozygopleura
  - †Pseudozygopleura yandellana – type locality for species
- †Psiloconcha
  - †Psiloconcha grandis
- †Psilokirkbyella
  - †Psilokirkbyella ozarkensis
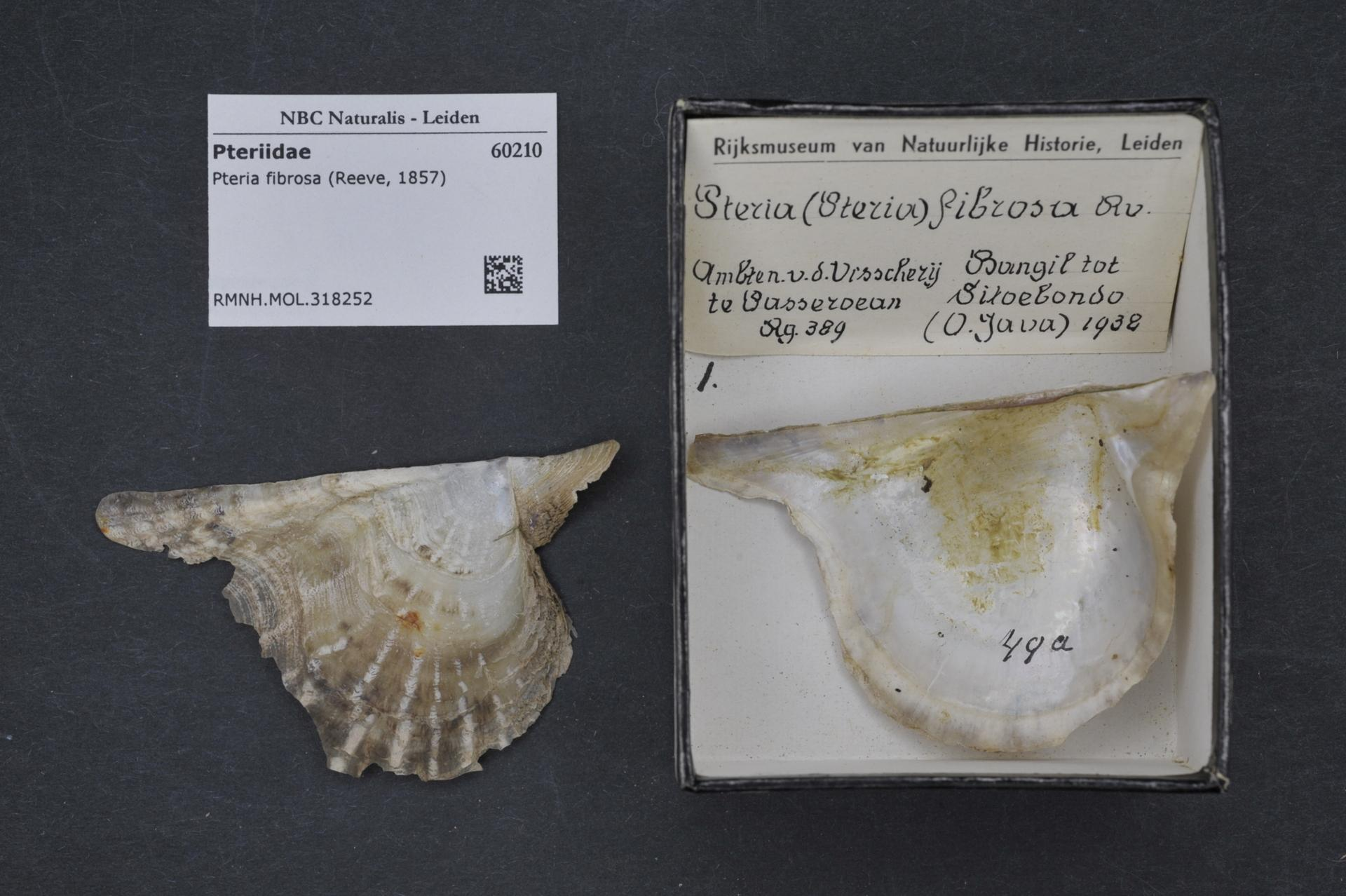
- Interior and exterior of the shell of a Pteria, or winged oyster
  †Pteria
- †Pterinea
  - †Pterinea brisa
  - †Pterinea demissa
- †Pterinopecten
  - †Pterinopecten hermes
  - †Pterinopecten princeps
- †Pterocephalia
- †Pterotheca
  - †Pterotheca expansa
  - †Pterotheca intermedia – type locality for species
- †Pterotocrinus
  - †Pterotocrinus acutus
  - †Pterotocrinus armatus – or unidentified comparable form
  - †Pterotocrinus bifurcatus
  - †Pterotocrinus birfurcatus
  - †Pterotocrinus convexus
  - †Pterotocrinus depressus
  - †Pterotocrinus lingulaformis
  - †Pterotocrinus rugosus
  - †Pterotocrinus spatulatus
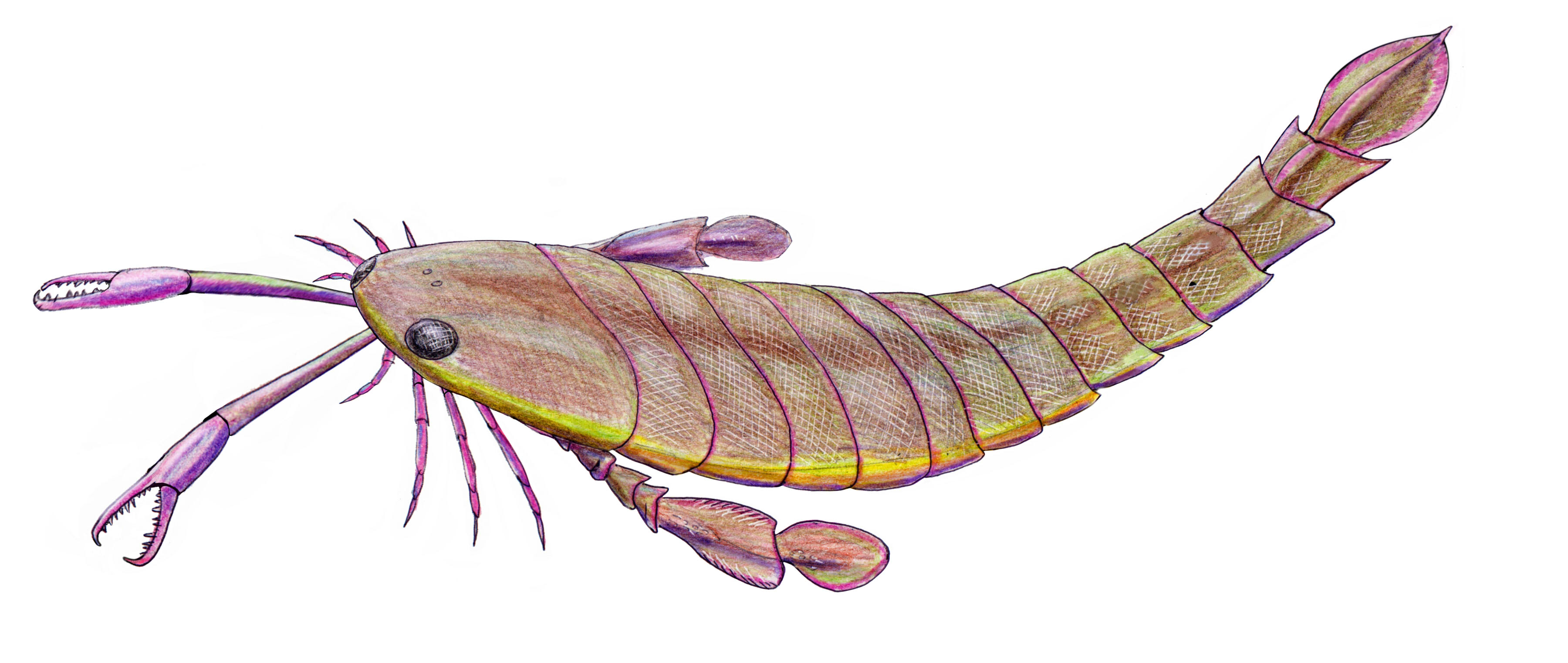
- Restoration of the Silurian-Middle Devonian eurypterid ("sea scorpion") Pterygotus
  †Pterygotus
  - †Pterygotus ventricosus
- †Ptychocarpus
  - †Ptychocarpus unitus
- †Ptychopleurella
- †Ptylopora
- †Punctatisporites
  - †Punctatisporites decorus
  - †Punctatisporites flavus
  - †Punctatisporites glaber
  - †Punctatisporites incomptus
  - †Punctatisporites minutus
  - †Punctatisporites nahannensis
  - †Punctatisporites obesus
  - †Punctatisporites orbicularis
- †Punctatosporites
  - †Punctatosporites minutus
- †Punctospirifer
  - †Punctospirifer obtusus
  - †Punctospirifer transversus
- †Pustulocystis
  - †Pustulocystis ornatissimus
- †Pycnosaccus
  - †Pycnosaccus laurelensis

== Q ==
- †Quasillinites
  - †Quasillinites diversiformis
- †Quasillites – tentative report
- †Quassilites

== R ==
- †Rafinesquina
  - †Rafinesquina alternata
  - †Rafinesquina ponderosa
- †Raistrickia
  - †Raistrickia breveminens
  - †Raistrickia carbondalensis
  - †Raistrickia crinita
  - †Raistrickia crocea
  - †Raistrickia lowellensis
  - †Raistrickia subcrinita
  - †Raistrickia superba
- †Raphistomina
  - †Raphistomina modesta – or unidentified comparable form
- †Rasmussenoceras
  - †Rasmussenoceras variable
- †Rectifenestella
  - †Rectifenestella tenax
- †Rectobaidia
  - †Rectobaidia fragosa – or unidentified related form
- †Reimannia
  - †Reimannia indianensis
- †Renalcis – tentative report
- †Renaultia
  - †Renaultia chaerophylloides
- Reophax
  - †Reophax lachrymosa
- †Resserella
  - †Resserella elegantula
  - †Resserella waldronensis
- †Reticulariina
  - †Reticulariina salemensis
  - †Reticulariina spinosa
- †Reticulatisporites
  - †Reticulatisporites polygonalis
  - †Reticulatisporites reticulatus
- †Reticulitriletes
  - †Reticulitriletes falsus
- †Reticulopteris
  - †Reticulopteris muensteri
- †Retispira
  - †Retispira textilis – type locality for species
- †Retoporina
  - †Retoporina striata
- †Retrorsirostra
  - †Retrorsirostra carleyi
- †Retzia
  - †Retzia raricosta
- †Rhabdocarpus
  - †Rhabdocarpus mamillatus
  - †Rhabdocarpus mansfieldi – or unidentified comparable form
  - †Rhabdocarpus multistriatus
- †Rhabdomeson
- †Rhadinichthys
- †Rhegmaphyllum – tentative report
  - †Rhegmaphyllum daytonensis
- †Rhineoderma
  - †Rhineoderma nodulostriata – type locality for species
  - †Rhineoderma wortheni – type locality for species
- †Rhinidictya
- †Rhipdomella
  - †Rhipdomella perminuta
- †Rhipidium
- †Rhipidomella
  - †Rhipidomella hybrida
  - †Rhipidomella missouriensis
  - †Rhipidomella penelope
  - †Rhipidomella perminuta
  - †Rhipidomella tenuicosta – or unidentified comparable form
  - †Rhipidomella vanuxemi
- †Rhipidothyris
- †Rhombopora
  - †Rhombopora simplex
- †Rhombotrypa
  - †Rhombotrypa quadrata
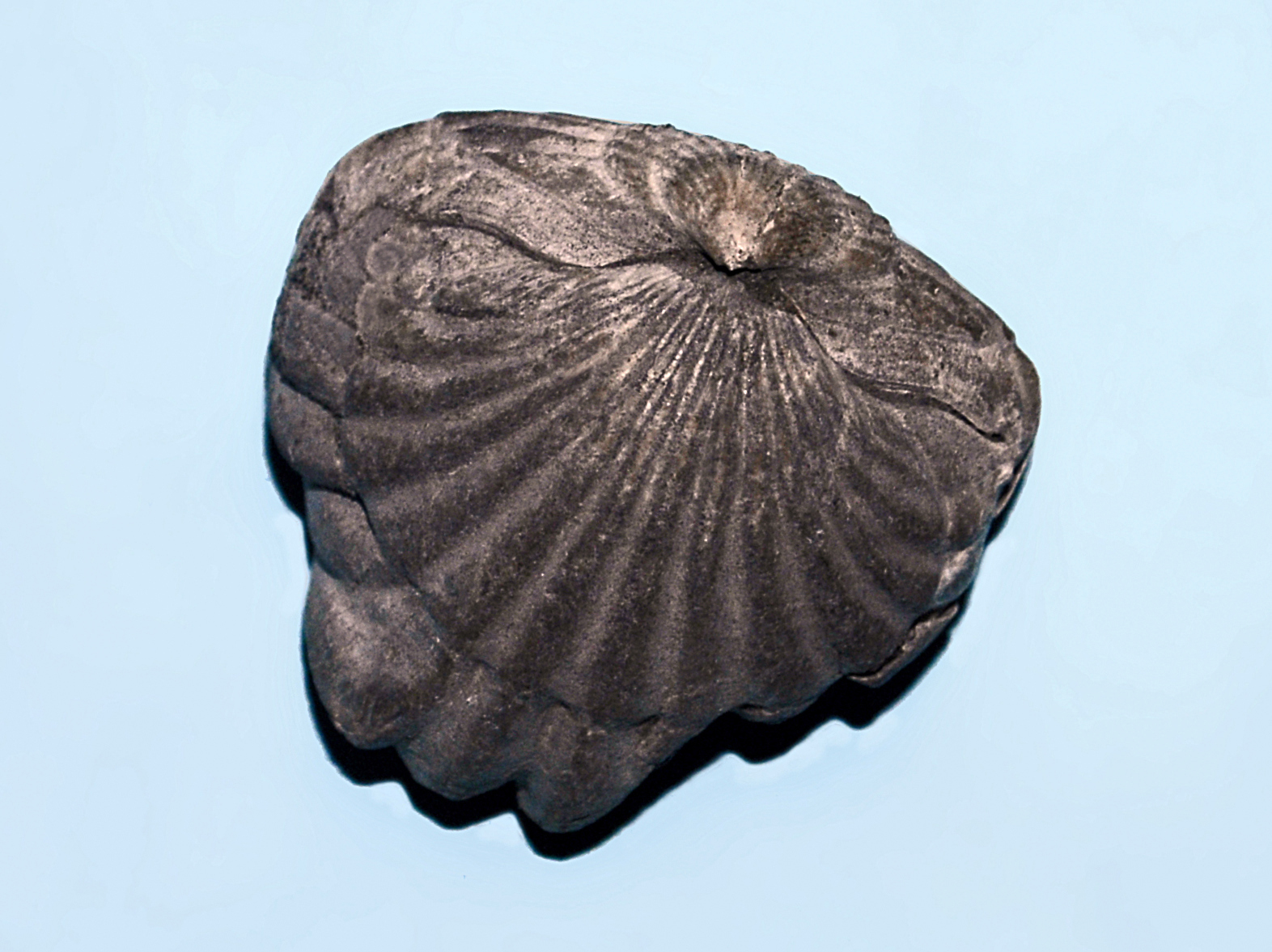
- Fossilized shell of the Silurian-Eocene articulate brachiopod Rhynchonella
  †Rhynchonella
  - †Rhynchonella gainesi
  - †Rhynchonella scobina
  - †Rhynchonella tenuistriata
- †Rhynchopora
  - †Rhynchopora beecheri
  - †Rhynchopora perryensis – tentative report
  - †Rhynchopora rowleyi – tentative report
- †Rhynchotrema
  - †Rhynchotrema denatum
  - †Rhynchotrema dentatum
- †Rhynchotreta
  - †Rhynchotreta americana
- †Rhysocamax
  - †Rhysocamax grandis
- †Rhytimya
  - †Rhytimya byrnesis
  - †Rhytimya mickleboroughi
- †Richmondoceras – type locality for genus
  - †Richmondoceras brevicameratum – type locality for species
- †Rineceras
  - †Rineceras digonum – tentative report
- †Romingerella
  - †Romingerella major – or unidentified comparable form
- †Romingeria
  - †Romingeria commutata
  - †Romingeria fasciculata
  - †Romingeria umbellifera
  - †Romingeria uva
- †Ropalonaria
- † Rota
- †Rotiphyllum
  - †Rotiphyllum calyculum
- †Roundyella
  - †Roundyella mopacifa
- †Rugomena
  - †Rugomena vetusta
- †Rugosochonetes
  - †Rugosochonetes illinoisensis
  - †Rugosochonetes planumbona

== S ==
- †Saccocrinus
  - †Saccocrinus benedicti
  - †Saccocrinus christyi
- †Saccosompsis
  - †Saccosompsis poterium
- †Saffordotaxis
- †Salpingostoma
  - †Salpingostoma buelli
  - †Salpingostoma richmondense
- †Samaropsis
  - †Samaropsis crampii – or unidentified comparable form
- †Sandalodus
- †Sanguinolites
  - †Sanguinolites herricki – tentative report
  - †Sanguinolites tropidophorus
- †Sapphicorhynchus
  - †Sapphicorhynchus sappho
- †Sarocrinus
  - †Sarocrinus nitidus
- †Savitrisporites
  - †Savitrisporites nux
- †Scalarituba
  - †Scalarituba missouriensis
- †Scalites
  - †Scalites richmondensis
- †Scenophyllum
  - †Scenophyllum conigerum
- †Schellwienella
  - †Schellwienella ulrichi
- †Schizobolus
  - †Schizobolus concentricus
- †Schizonema – tentative report
- †Schizophoria
- †Schlotheimophyllum
  - †Schlotheimophyllum typicum
- †Schoenaster
  - †Schoenaster fimbriatus
- †Schopfites
  - †Schopfites colchesterensis
  - †Schopfites dimorphus
- †Schuchertella
  - †Schuchertella costatula
  - †Schuchertella lens – tentative report
  - †Schuchertella subplana
- †Schuchertoceras
  - †Schuchertoceras geniculatum
  - †Schuchertoceras prolongatum
  - †Schuchertoceras rotundum
- †Schulzospora
  - †Schulzospora rara
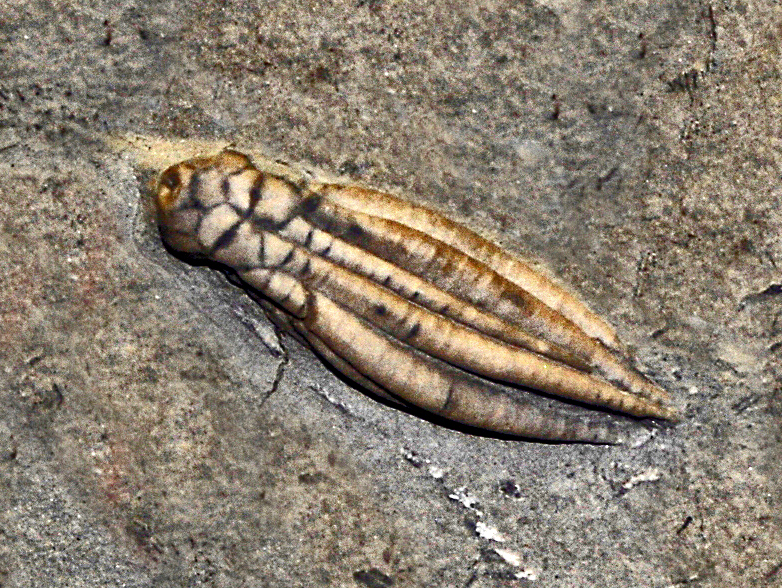
- Fossilized calyx of the Carboniferous crinoid ("sea lily") Scytalocrinus
  †Scytalocrinus
  - †Scytalocrinus decadactylus
  - †Scytalocrinus disparilis – or unidentified comparable form
  - †Scytalocrinus robustus
- †Senftenbergia
  - †Senftenbergia pennaeformis
- †Septopora
  - †Septopora cestriensis
  - †Septopora subquadrans
- †Serpulopsis
  - †Serpulopsis jacobschapelensis
- †Serpulospira
  - †Serpulospira planispira
- †Setigerites
  - †Setigerites setiger
  - †Setigerites setigerus
- †Shideleroceras
  - †Shideleroceras gracile
- †Shivaella
  - †Shivaella nicklesi
- †Sibyrhynchus – type locality for genus
  - †Sibyrhynchus denisoni – type locality for species
- †Siderella
  - †Siderella scotti
- †Sidetes
- †Sievertsia
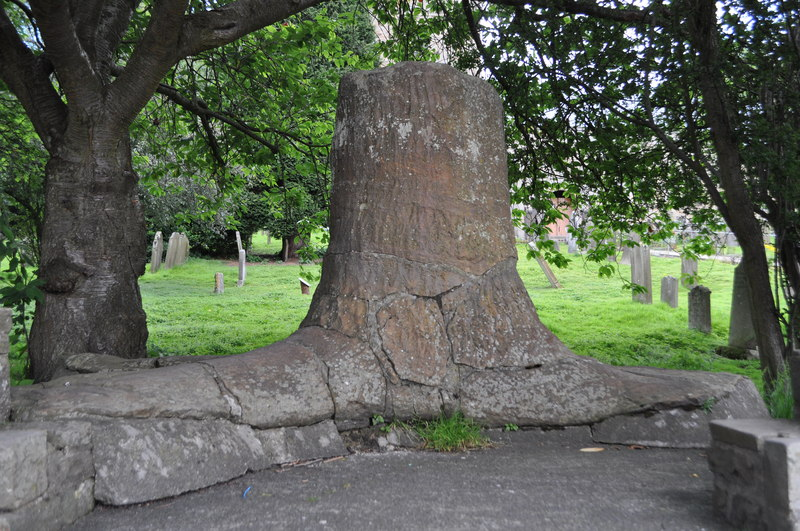
- Fossilized stump of the Carboniferous-Permian club moss relative Sigillaria
  †Sigillaria
  - †Sigillaria brardii
  - †Sigillaria davreuxi
  - †Sigillaria kidstoni – tentative report
  - †Sigillaria mamillaris – or unidentified comparable form
  - †Sigillaria monostigma
  - †Sigillaria scutellata
- †Sigillariostrobus
  - †Sigillariostrobus quadrangularis
- †Silenites
  - †Silenites warei – or unidentified comparable form
- †Sinochonetes
  - †Sinochonetes lepidus
- †Sinuites
  - †Sinuites cancellatus
  - †Sinuites subcompressa
- †Sinuitina
- †Siphonophrentis
  - †Siphonophrentis elongata
  - †Siphonophrentis planima
  - †Siphonophrentis yandelli
- †Skelidorygma
  - †Skelidorygma subcardiiformis
- †Skenidioides
- Sorosphaera – tentative report
- †Sowerbyella
  - †Sowerbyella rugosa
- †Spackmanites
  - †Spackmanites facierugosus – or unidentified comparable form
  - †Spackmanites habibii
- †Spathella
  - †Spathella illinoiensis
- †Spathiocaris
- †Spathognathodus
  - †Spathognathodus snadjri – or unidentified comparable form
- †Spatiopora
- †Sphaerexochus
  - †Sphaerexochus romingeri
- †Sphaerirhynchia
  - †Sphaerirhynchia stricklandi
- †Sphaerocodium
- †Sphaerocyclus – report made of unidentified related form or using admittedly obsolete nomenclature
  - †Sphaerocyclus tuber
- †Sphenophyllostachys
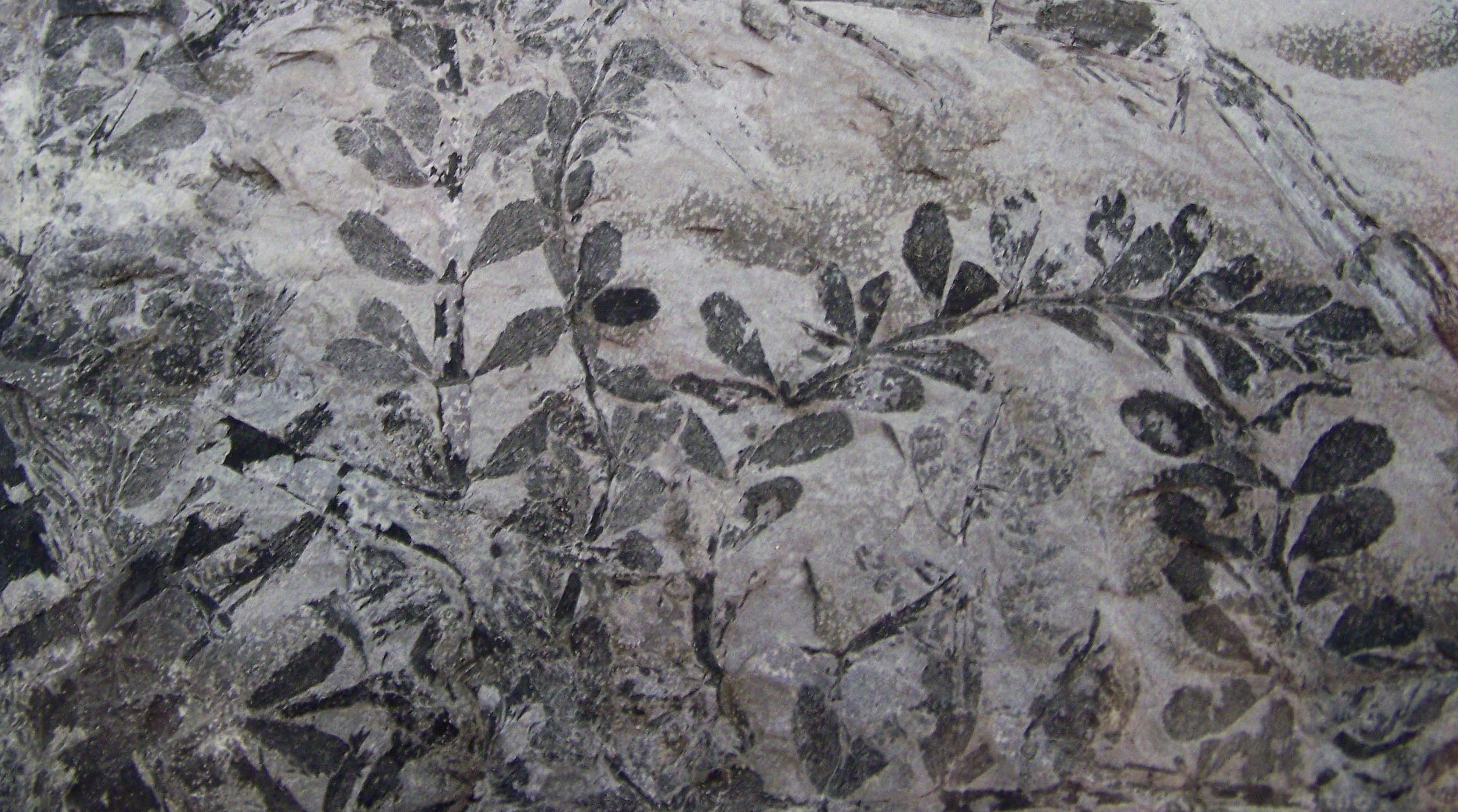
- Fossilized leaves and branches of the Devonian-Triassic horsetail relative Sphenophyllum
  †Sphenophyllum
  - †Sphenophyllum cuneifolium
  - †Sphenophyllum emarginatum
  - †Sphenophyllum hauchecornei
  - †Sphenophyllum myriophyllum
  - †Sphenophyllum plurifoliatum
- †Sphenopteris
  - †Sphenopteris broadheadi
  - †Sphenopteris shatzlarensis
- †Sphenosphaera
  - †Sphenosphaera mohri
  - †Sphenosphaera subangularis – type locality for species
- †Spinocyrtia
  - †Spinocyrtia euryteines
- †Spinozonotriletes
- †Spinulicosta
  - †Spinulicosta spinulicosta
- †Spinyplatyceras
  - †Spinyplatyceras milleri
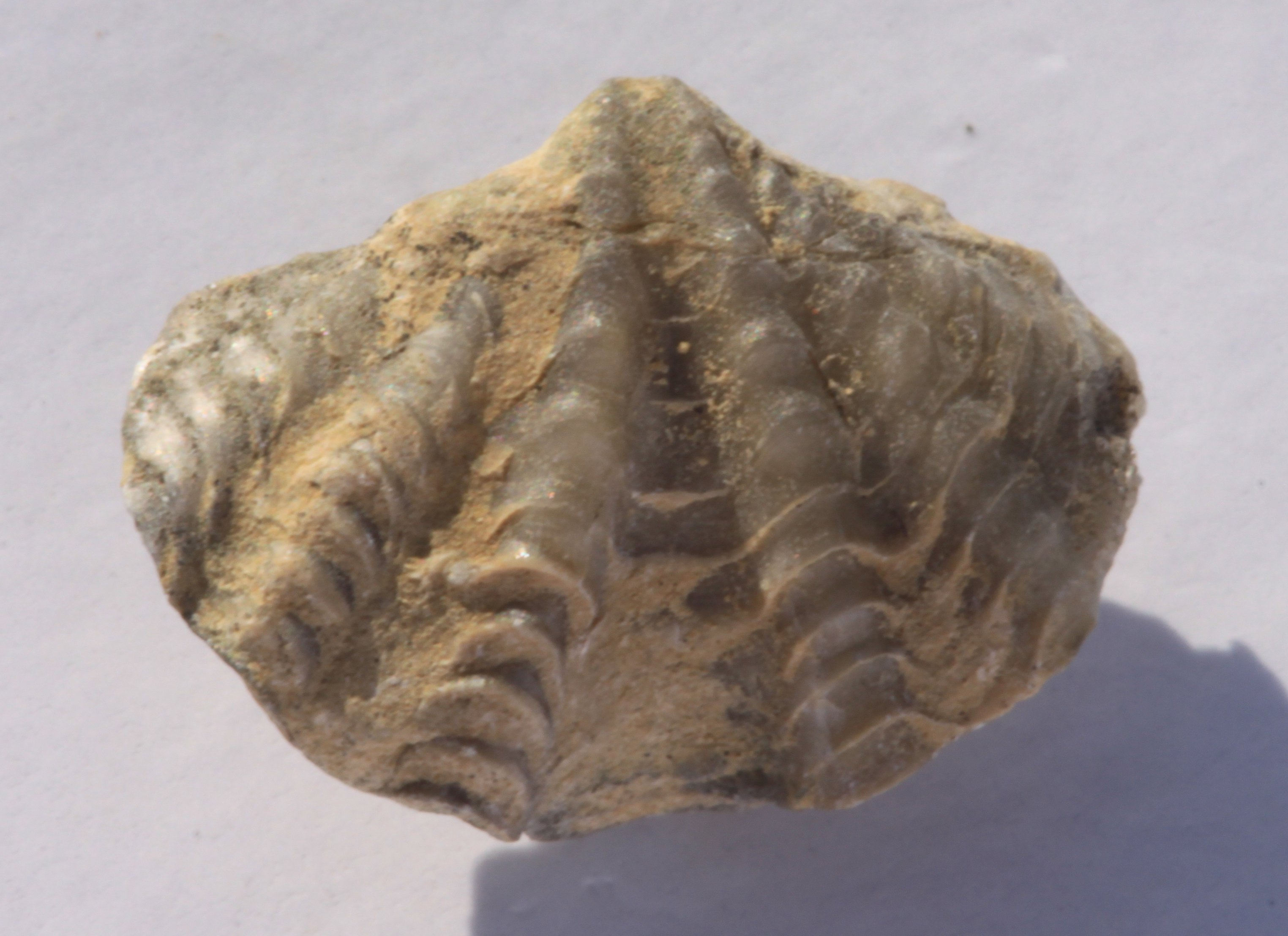
- Fossilized shell of the Late Ordovician-Late Triassic brachiopod Spirifer
  †Spirifer
  - †Spirifer angusta
  - †Spirifer bifurcatus
  - †Spirifer byrnesi
  - †Spirifer crawfordsvillensis
  - †Spirifer floydensis – tentative report
  - †Spirifer fornaculus
  - †Spirifer increbescens
  - †Spirifer keokuk
  - †Spirifer macrus
  - †Spirifer montgomeryensis
  - †Spirifer mundulus – or unidentified comparable form
  - †Spirifer pellaensis – tentative report
  - †Spirifer rostellatus
  - †Spirifer shepardi – or unidentified related form
  - †Spirifer shephardi – or unidentified related form
  - †Spirifer tenuicostatus
  - †Spirifer tenuimarginatus
  - †Spirifer varicosus
  - †Spirifer veronensis – or unidentified comparable form
  - †Spirifer washingtonensis
- Spiropteris
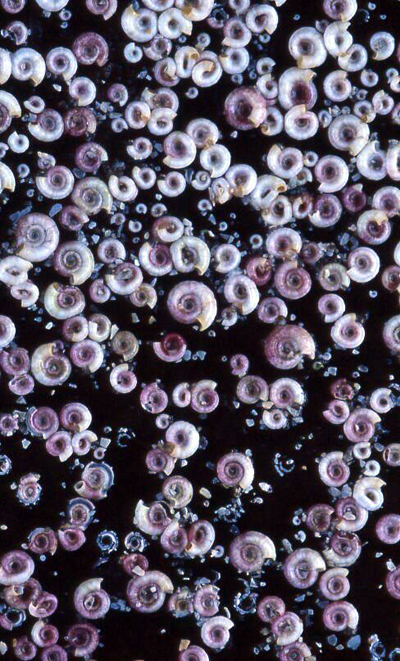
- Modern shells of the polychaete worm Spirorbis
  Spirorbis
- †Spiroscala
- †Sporangites
  - †Sporangites huronensis
- †Springericrinus
  - †Springericrinus doris – tentative report
  - †Springericrinus magniventrus – tentative report
- †Spyroceras
  - †Spyroceras nuntium
- †Stacheia
  - †Stacheia cicatrix
  - †Stacheia trepeilopsiformis
- †Staurocephalus
- †Stegerhynchus
  - †Stegerhynchus indianense
  - †Stegerhynchus indianensis
  - †Stegerhynchus neglectum – or unidentified comparable form
  - †Stegerhynchus neglectus
  - †Stegerhynchus whitii
- †Stelastellara
  - †Stelastellara parvula
- †Stelliporella
  - †Stelliporella lamellata – or unidentified comparable form
- †Stenoloron
  - †Stenoloron swallovana – type locality for species
- †Stenopareia
- †Stenoscisma
  - †Stenoscisma explanatum
- †Stephanocrinus
  - †Stephanocrinus cornetti
  - †Stephanocrinus elongatus
  - †Stephanocrinus gemmiformis
  - †Stephanocrinus obpyramidalis
  - †Stephanocrinus quinquepartitus
- †Stereolasma
  - †Stereolasma exile – tentative report
  - †Stereolasma parvulum
- †Stethacanthulus – type locality for genus
  - †Stethacanthulus longipeniculus – type locality for species
  - †Stethacanthulus meccaensis
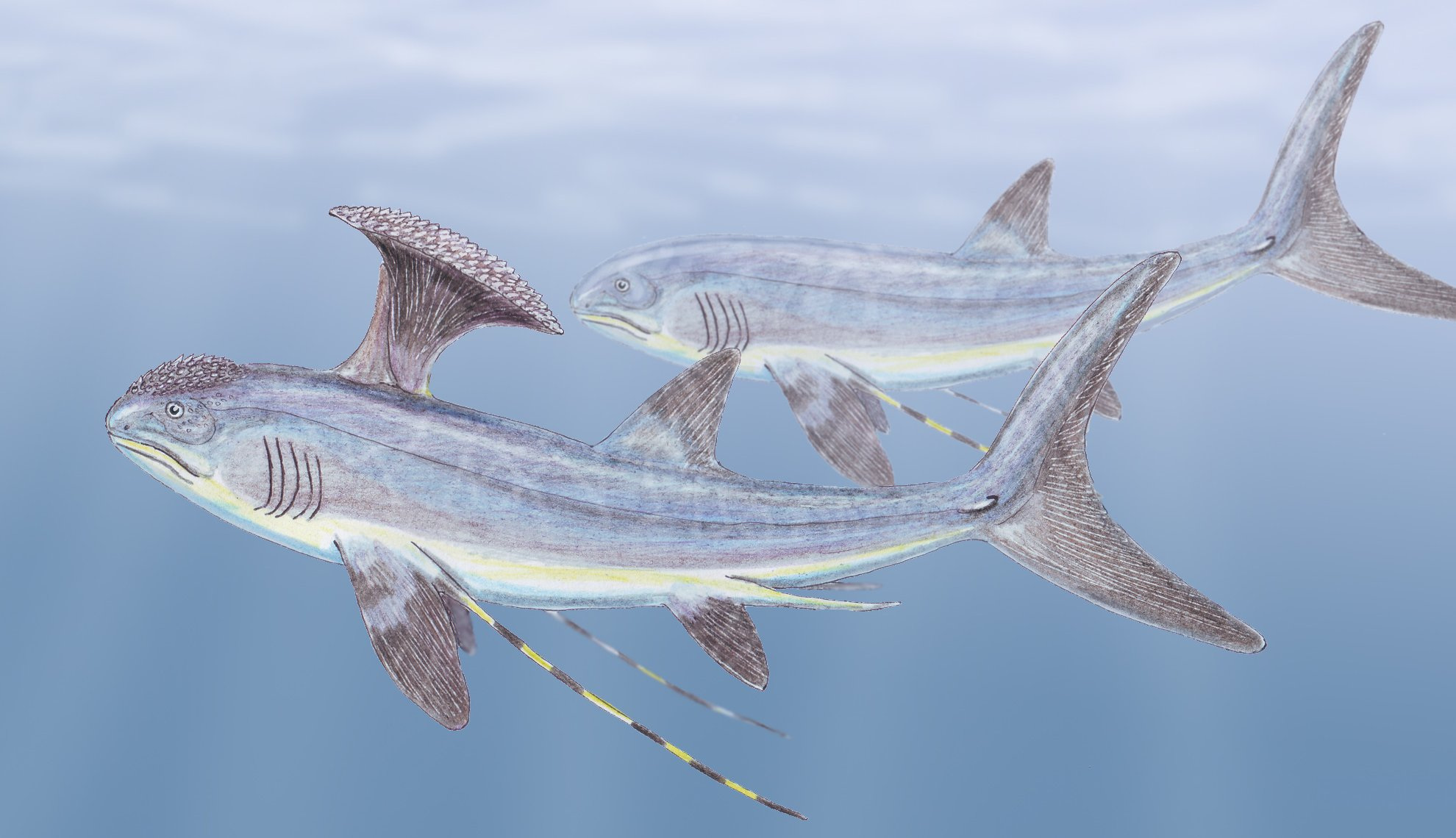
- Life restorations of a male (foreground) and female (background) of the Late Devonian-Carboniferous Chimaera relative Stethacanthus
  †Stethacanthus
  - †Stethacanthus altonensis
  - †Stethacanthus longipeniculus – type locality for species
- †Stictoporina
  - †Stictoporina granulifera
- †Stigmaria
  - †Stigmaria ficoides
  - †Stigmaria wedingtonensis
- †Stigmatella
  - †Stigmatella dubia
- †Stinocrinus
- †Stiptocrinus
  - †Stiptocrinus benedicti
  - †Stiptocrinus howardi
  - †Stiptocrinus ornatus
- Stomatopora
- †Straparollus
  - †Straparollus planodiscus
  - †Straparollus quadrivolvis – type locality for species
  - †Straparollus spergenensis – type locality for species
- †Streblotrypa
- †Streblotrypella
- †Streptelasma
  - †Streptelasma divaricans
  - †Streptelasma vagans
- †Striatopora
  - †Striatopora alba – tentative report
  - †Striatopora bellistriata
  - †Striatopora cavernosa
  - †Striatopora flexuosa
- †Stricklandia – tentative report
- †Striispirifer
- †Stromatopora
  - †Stromatopora antiqua
- †Stropeodonta
- †Stropheodonta
  - †Stropheodonta demissa
- †Strophochonetes
  - †Strophochonetes novascotica
- †Strophodonta
  - †Strophodonta demissa
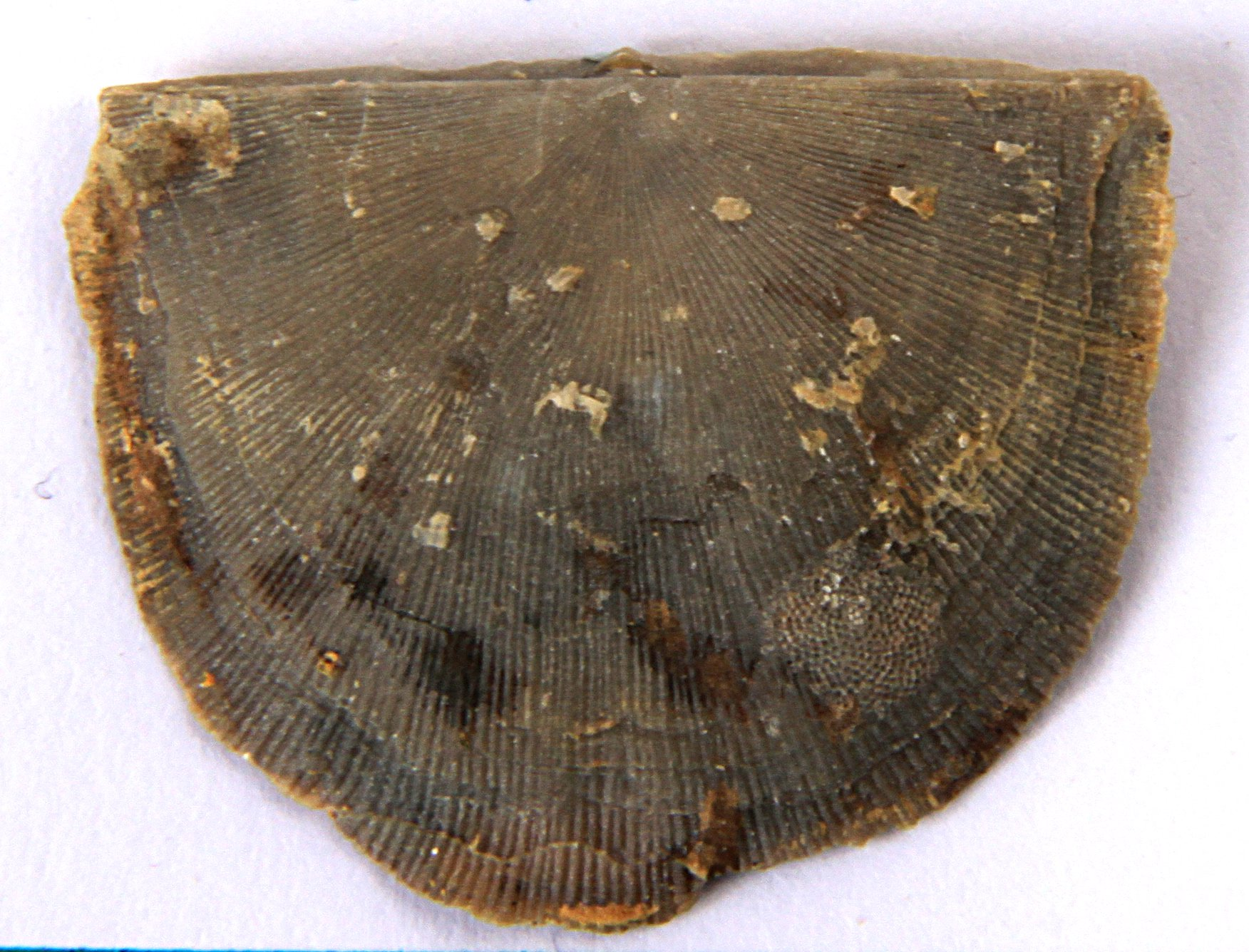
- Fossilized shell of the Ordovician-Silurian brachiopod Strophomena
  †Strophomena
  - †Strophomena concordensis
  - †Strophomena erratica
  - †Strophomena extenuata
  - †Strophomena fissicosta
  - †Strophomena inequistriata
  - †Strophomena neglecta
  - †Strophomena nutans
  - †Strophomena planoconvexa
  - †Strophomena planumbona
  - †Strophomena scottensis
  - †Strophomena sulcata
  - †Strophomena vestusta
- †Strophonella
  - †Strophonella semifasciata
  - †Strophonella williamsi
- †Strophostylus
  - †Strophostylus cyclostomus
- †Styliolina
- †Stylolina
- †Subglobosochonetes
- †Sulcatina
  - †Sulcatina sulcata
- †Sulcoretepora
- †Sumixam – type locality for genus
  - †Sumixam maximus – type locality for species
- †Sutcliffia
  - †Sutcliffia insignis
- †Synbathocrinus
  - †Synbathocrinus swallovi
  - †Synbathocrinus swallowvi
- †Synchysidendron
  - †Synchysidendron resinosum
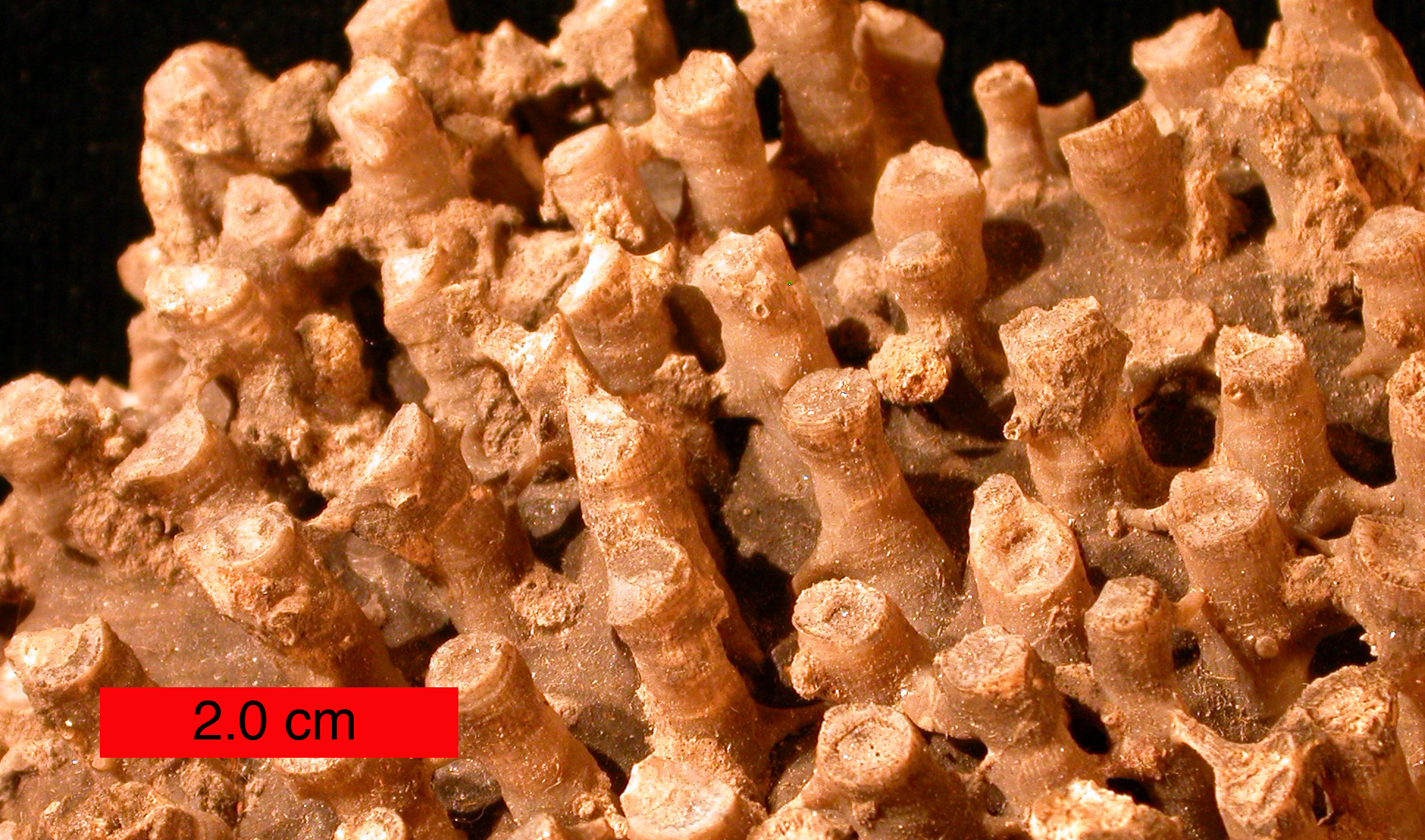
- Fossil of the Devonian tabulate coral Syringopora
  †Syringopora
  - †Syringopora hisingeri
  - †Syringopora monroensis
  - †Syringopora perelegans
- †Syringoporida
- †Syringothyris
  - †Syringothyris subcuspidatus – or unidentified comparable form
  - †Syringothyris textus

== T ==
- †Tabulipora
  - †Tabulipora cestriensis
  - †Tabulipora ramosa
- †Taeniodictya
- †Tamiobatis
  - †Tamiobatis springeri
- †Tasmanites
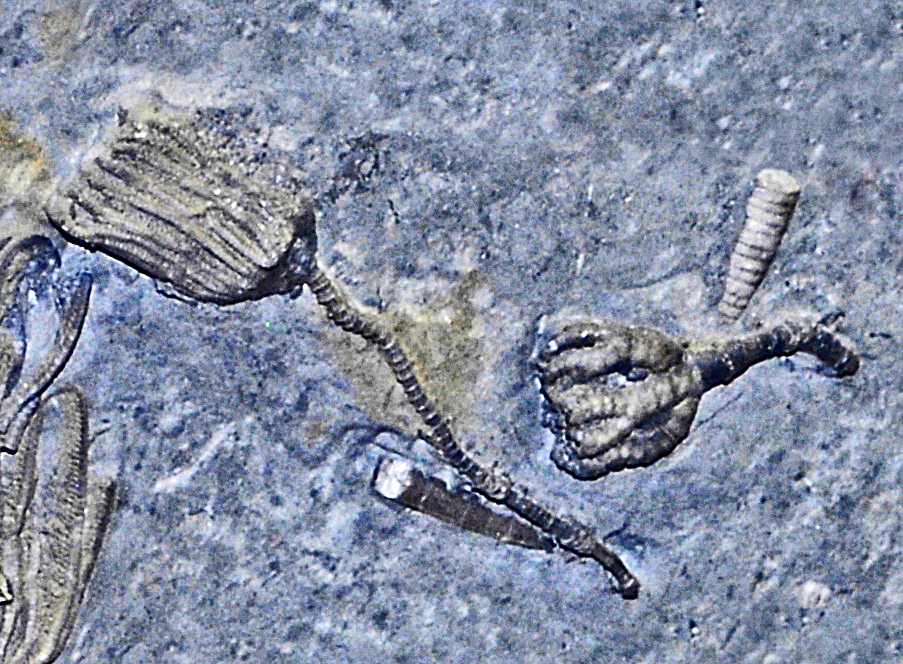
- Fossil of the Silurian-Carboniferous crinoid ("sea lily") Taxocrinus (right)
  †Taxocrinus
  - †Taxocrinus colletti
  - †Taxocrinus ungula – tentative report
- †Tentaculites
  - †Tentaculites gracilistriatus
  - †Tentaculites sterlingensis
- †Tetradium
  - †Tetradium huronense
- †Tetranota
  - †Tetranota wisconsinensis
- †Tetrasacculus
  - †Tetrasacculus stewarte – tentative report
- †Thalamocrinus
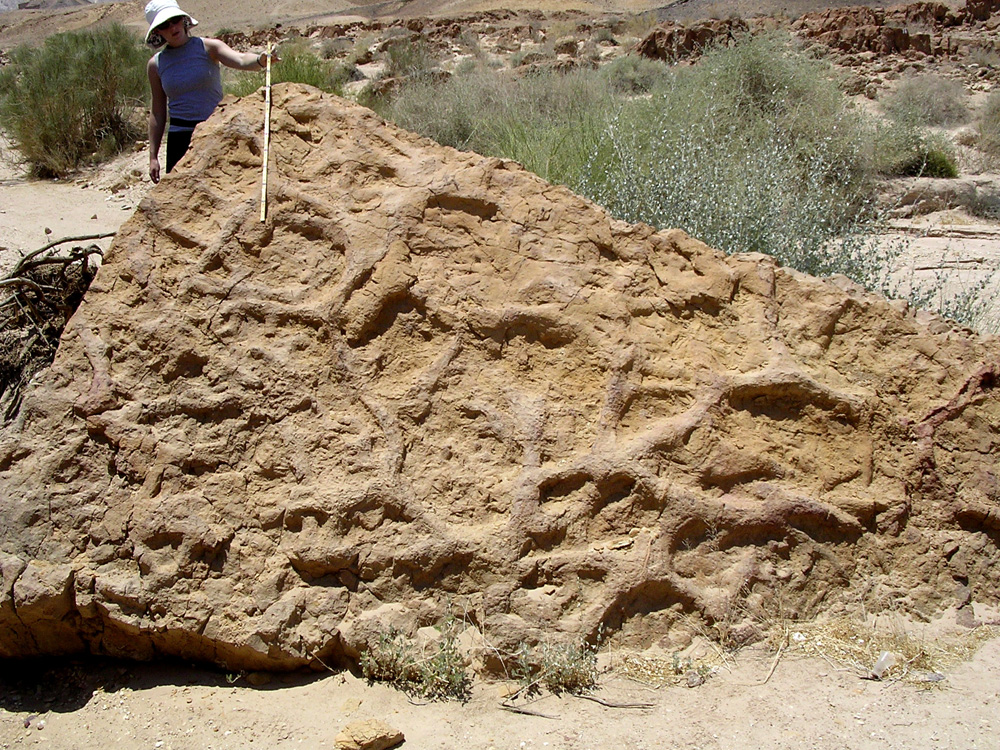
- Fossils of the burrow ichnogenus Thalassinoides
  †Thalassinoides
- †Thalassoinoides
- †Thamniscus
- †Thamnopora
  - †Thamnopora limitaris
- †Thamnoptychia
  - †Thamnoptychia alpenensis
  - †Thamnoptychia tuberculata – type locality for species
- †Thecia
  - †Thecia minor – or unidentified comparable form
- †Thuraminoides
  - †Thuraminoides sphaeroidalis
- Thurammina
  - †Thurammina arenicorna
  - †Thurammina limbata
- †Thuramminoides
  - †Thuramminoides sphaeroidalis
- †Thuroholia
  - †Thuroholia spicatus – type locality for species
- †Thymospora
  - †Thymospora pseudothiessenii
- †Tolypaminna
  - †Tolypaminna frizzelli
  - †Tolypaminna rotula
- †Tolypammina
  - †Tolypammina bransoni
  - †Tolypammina bulbosa
  - †Tolypammina cyclops
  - †Tolypammina gersterensis
  - †Tolypammina jacobschapelensis
  - †Tolypammina laocoon – or unidentified related form
  - †Tolypammina rotula
- †Torispora
  - †Torispora securis
- †Torynifer
  - †Torynifer pseudolineata
  - †Torynifer pseudolineatus
  - †Torynifer salemensis
  - †Torynifer setiger
- †Tremanotus
  - †Tremanotus chicagoensis
- †Trematis
  - †Trematis millepuntata
  - †Trematis millipunctata
- †Trematocystis
  - †Trematocystis magniporatus
- †Trematopora
- †Trepeilopsis
  - †Trepeilopsis glomospiroides
  - †Trepeilopsis recurvidens
  - †Trepeilopsis spiralis
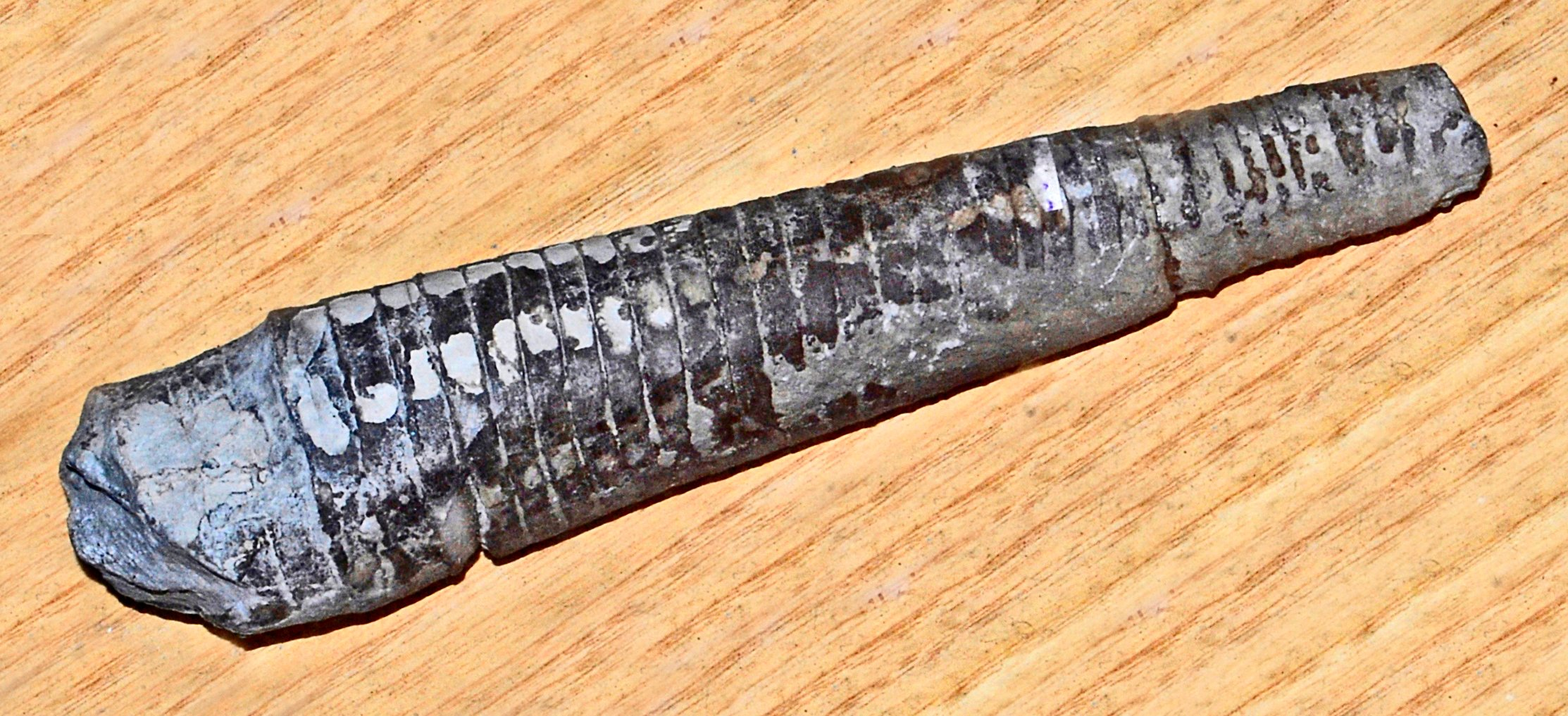
- Fossilized shell of the Ordovician nautiloid cephalopod Treptoceras
  †Treptoceras
  - †Treptoceras cincinnatiensis
  - †Treptoceras duseri
  - †Treptoceras fosteri
  - †Treptoceras hitzi
- †Triamara
  - †Triamara laevis
  - †Triamara tumida
  - †Triamara ventricosa – type locality for species
- †Triangulotarbus – type locality for genus
  - †Triangulotarbus terrehautensis – type locality for species
- †Tricopelta
  - †Tricopelta breviceps
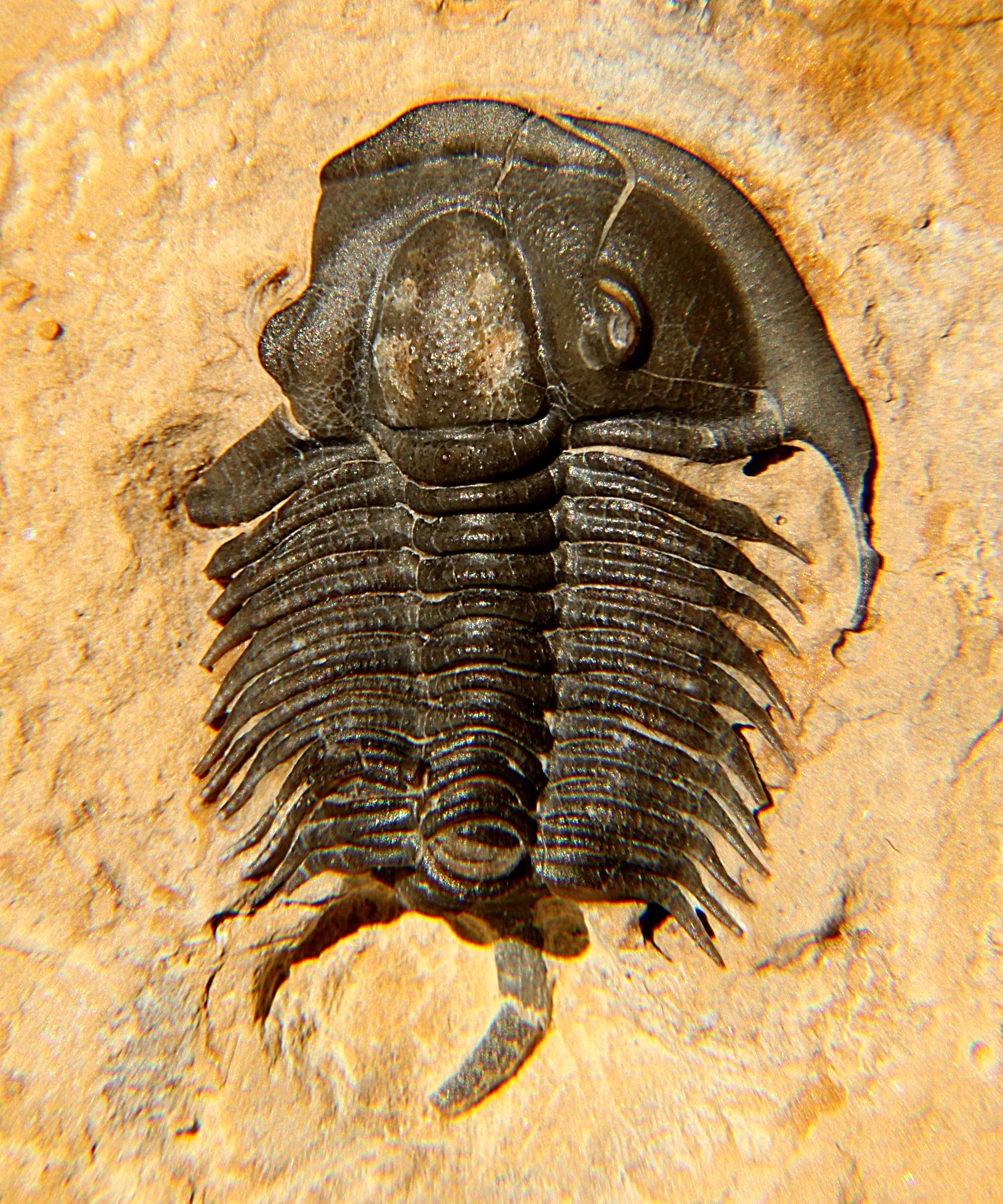
- Fossil of the Cambrian trilobite Tricrepicephalus
  †Tricrepicephalus
- †Trigonocarpus
- †Trigonoglossa
- †Trimerella
- †Trimerus
  - †Trimerus delphinocephalus
- †Trimoceras
  - †Trimoceras gilberti
- †Triplesia
  - †Triplesia putillus
- †Triquitrites
  - †Triquitrites additus
  - †Triquitrites bransonii
  - †Triquitrites exiguus
  - †Triquitrites minutus
  - †Triquitrites protensus
  - †Triquitrites spinosus
  - †Triquitrites subspinosus
- †Trochonema
  - †Trochonema madisonense
  - †Trochonema umbilicata – or unidentified comparable form
- †Trochophyllum
- †Troosticrinus
  - †Troosticrinus sanctipaulensis
- †Trophocrinus
  - †Trophocrinus tumidus
- †Tropidocaris
- †Tropidoleptus
  - †Tropidoleptus carinatus
- †Tryplasma
  - †Tryplasma parva
- †Tubelelloides
  - †Tubelelloides longus
- †Tuberculatosporites
  - †Tuberculatosporites robustus
- †Tubulelloides
- †Turneropterum – type locality for genus
  - †Turneropterum turneri – type locality for species
- †Turrilepas
- †Twenhofelella
  - †Twenhofelella waldroni – type locality for species
- †Tylothyris

== U ==
- †Undulabucania
  - †Undulabucania gorbyi – type locality for species
- †Unispirifer
  - †Unispirifer lateralis
  - †Unispirifer rundlensis – or unidentified related form
- †Uperocrinus
  - †Uperocrinus apheles

== V ==
- †Valvisporites
- †Vandelooaster
  - †Vandelooaster plicatilis
- †Vaurealispongia
  - †Vaurealispongia minuta – type locality for species
- †Vermiforichnus
- †Vermiformichnus
- †Verrucosisporites
  - †Verrucosisporites microtuberosus
  - †Verrucosisporites verrucosus
- †Vesicaspora
  - †Vesicaspora wilsonii
- †Vesicasporites
  - †Vesicasporites wilsonii
- †Vestispora
  - †Vestispora costata
  - †Vestispora fenestrata
  - †Vestispora foveata
  - †Vestispora laevigata
  - †Vestispora pseudoreticulata
- †Voiseyella
  - †Voiseyella novamexicana
- †Voiseyells
  - †Voiseyells novamexicana – or unidentified related form
- †Vorticina
  - †Vorticina cyrtolites

== W ==
- †Waltzispora
  - †Waltzispora prisca
- †Warsawia
  - †Warsawia lateralis
- †Waylandella
  - †Waylandella dartyensis
- †Welleroceras
  - †Welleroceras liratum
- †Whitfieldella
  - †Whitfieldella intermedia
  - †Whitfieldella nitida
- †Whitfieldoceras – tentative report
  - †Whitfieldoceras casteri
- †Whittleseya
- †Wilsonicrinus
  - †Wilsonicrinus discoideus
- †Wilsoniella
  - †Wilsoniella saffordi
- †Wilsonites
  - †Wilsonites circularis
  - †Wilsonites vesicatus
- †Worthenopora
  - †Worthenopora spinosa

== X ==
- †Xenocrinus

== Y ==
- †Youngiella – tentative report

== Z ==
- †Zaphrenthis
  - †Zaphrenthis aequus
  - †Zaphrenthis phrygia
- †Zeacrinites
  - †Zeacrinites doverensis
  - †Zeacrinites trapezinatus
  - †Zeacrinites wortheni
- †Zittelloceras
  - †Zittelloceras hitzi
  - †Zittelloceras lentidilatatum
  - †Zittelloceras shidleri
- †Zonidiscus
  - †Zonidiscus youngi
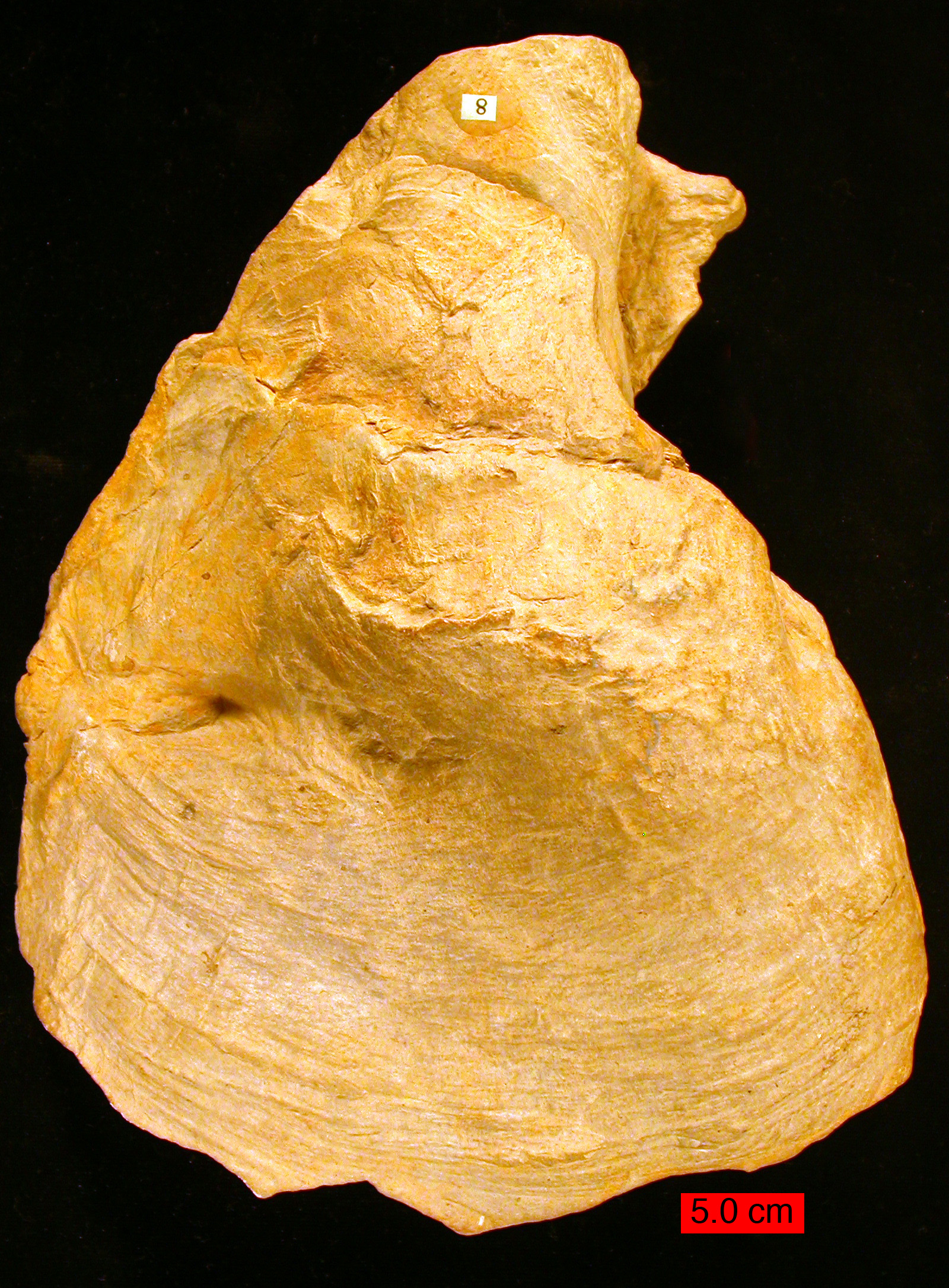
- Fossil of the feeding trace ichnogenus Zoophycos
  †Zoophycos
- †Zophocrinus
  - †Zophocrinus howardi
- †Zygospira
  - †Zygospira modesta
