= List of the prehistoric life of Kentucky =

This list of the prehistoric life of Kentucky contains the various prehistoric life-forms whose fossilized remains have been reported from within the US state of Kentucky.

== Precambrian ==
The Paleobiology Database records no known occurrences of Precambrian fossils in Kentucky.

== Paleozoic ==
=== Selected Paleozoic taxa of Kentucky ===
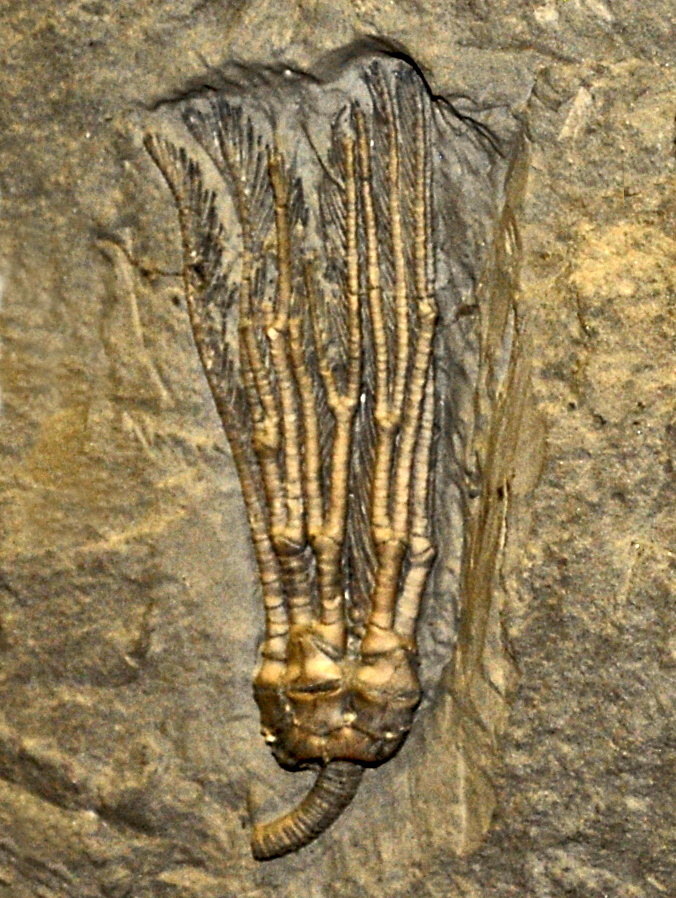
- Fossilized calyx of the Carboniferous crinoid ("sea lily") Abrotocrinus
  †Abrotocrinus
  - †Abrotocrinus coreyi
  - †Abrotocrinus unicus
- †Achatella
- †Achistrum
  - †Achistrum ludwigi
  - †Achistrum nicholsoni
- †Acidaspis
- † Acrophyllum
- †Actinoceras
- †Actinocrinites
  - †Actinocrinites gibsoni
- †Agaricocrinus
  - †Agaricocrinus americanus
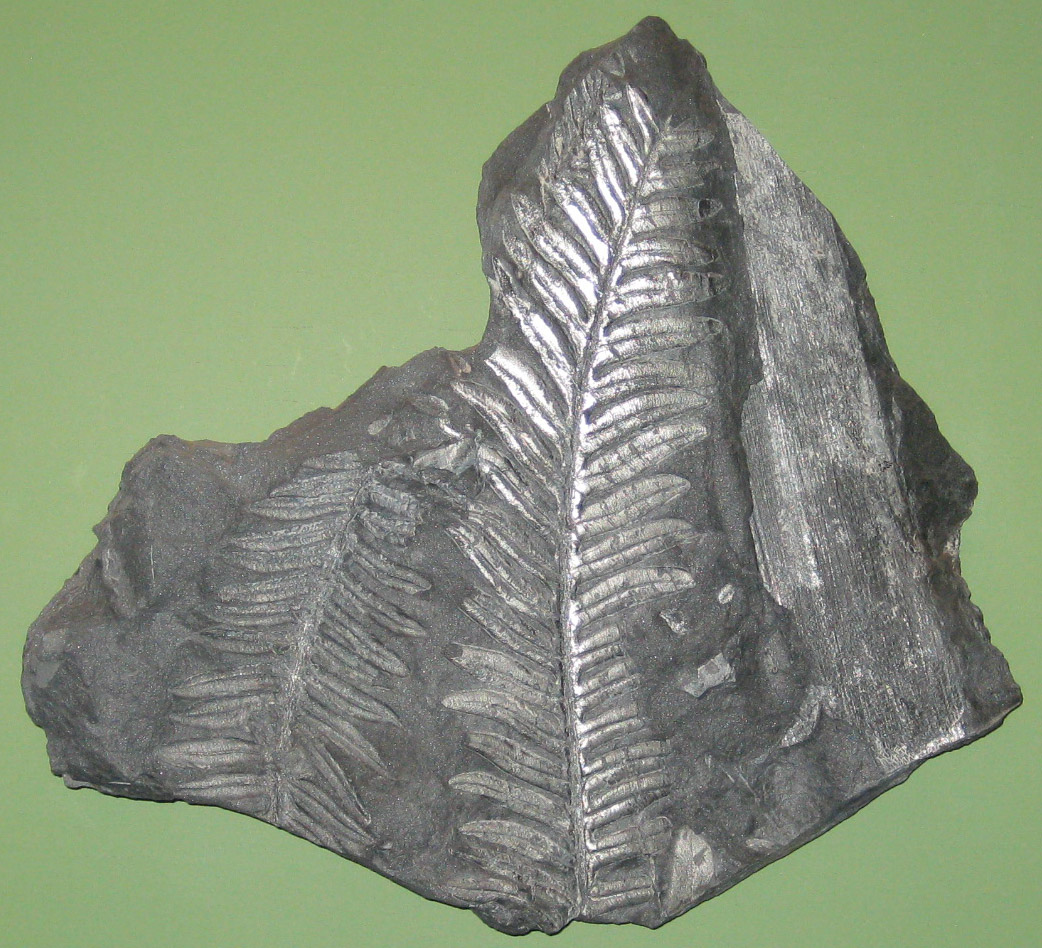
- Fossilized fronds of the Carboniferous-Early Cretaceous seed fern Alethopteris
  †Alethopteris
  - †Alethopteris decurrens
  - †Alethopteris lonchitica – or unidentified comparable form
- †Ammonellipsites
- †Amphiscapha
- †Amplexopora
- †Amplexus
- †Anchiopella
- †Anisophyllum
- †Annularia
- †Archaeocidaris
- †Archaeopteris
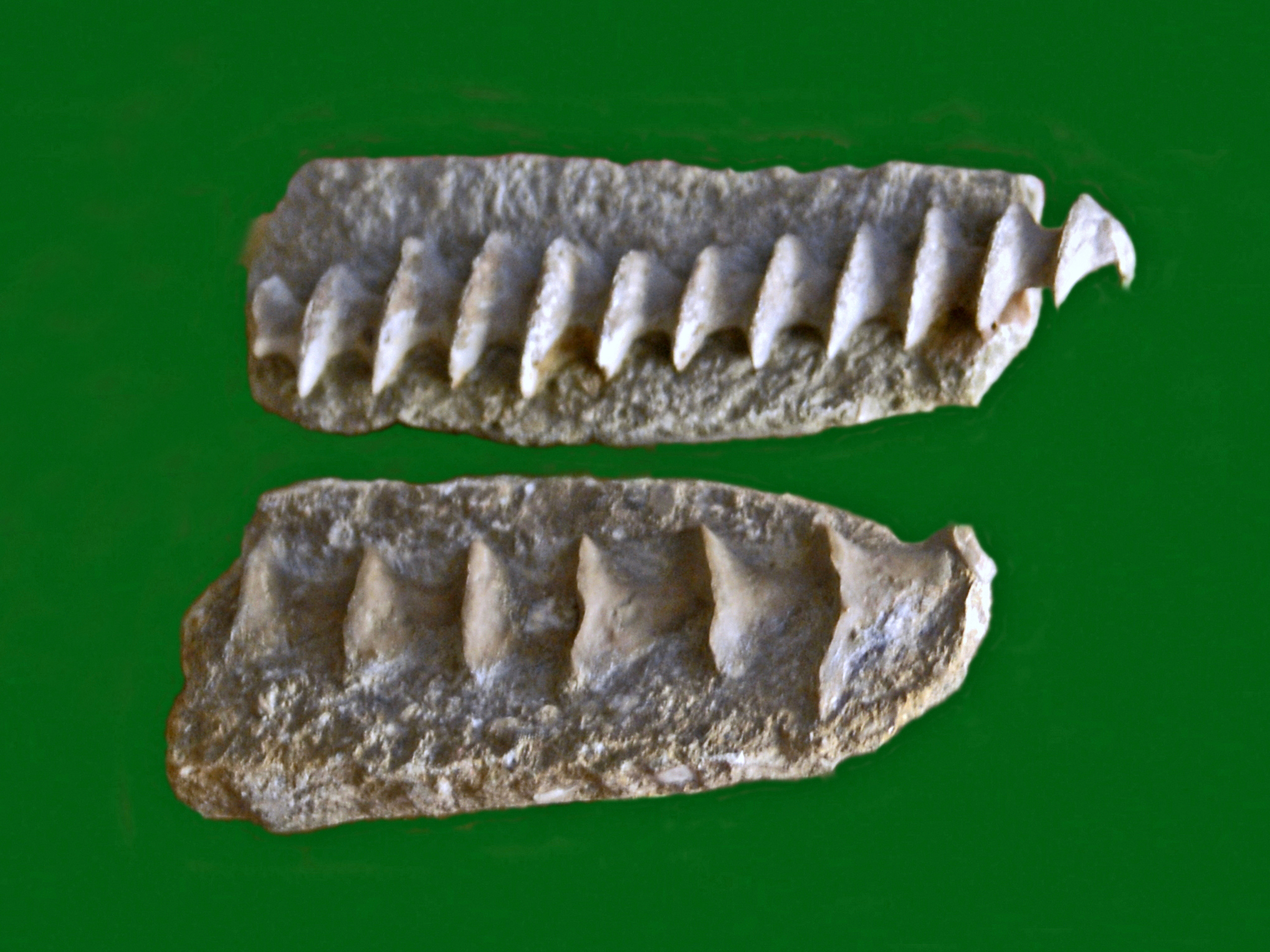
- Fossils of the Carboniferous-Permian bryozoan Archimedes
  †Archimedes
  - †Archimedes communis
  - †Archimedes compactus
  - †Archimedes distans
  - †Archimedes invaginatus
  - †Archimedes lativolvis
  - †Archimedes macfarlani
  - †Archimedes meekanoides
  - †Archimedes meekanus
  - †Archimedes proutanus
  - †Archimedes swallowvanus
  - †Archimedes terebriformis
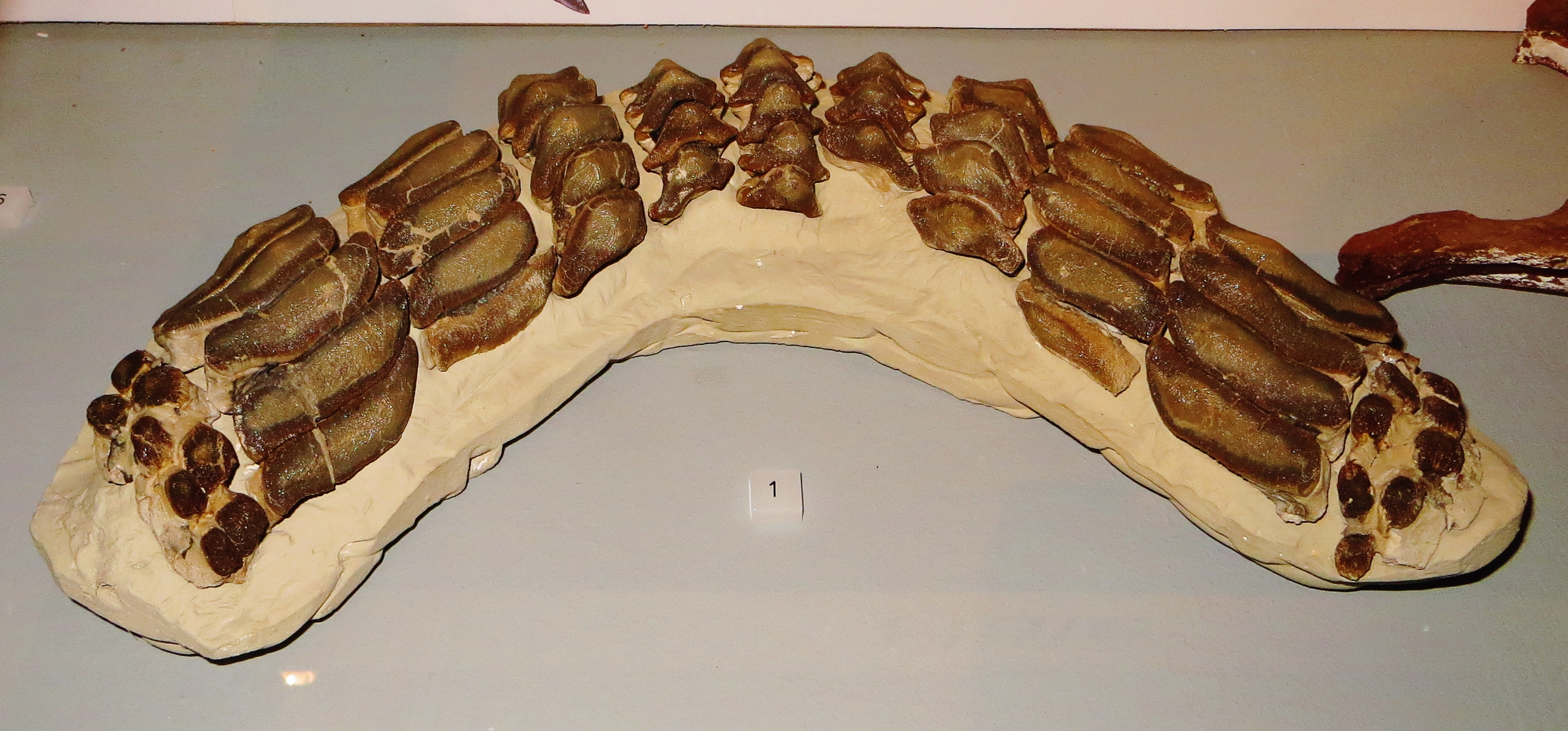
- Fossilized teeth of the Devonian-Cretaceous shark Asteracanthus
  †Asteracanthus
- †Athyris
  - †Athyris fultonensis
- †Atrypa
- †Augustoceras
- †Aulopora
  - †Aulopora tubiporoides
- †Aviculopecten
  - †Aviculopecten germanus – or unidentified related form
- †Bellerophon
- †Beyrichoceras
- †Bisatoceras – tentative report
- †Bostonia
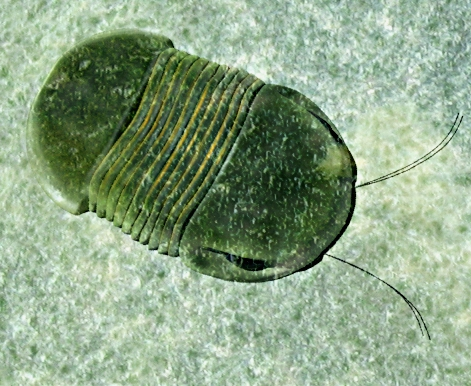
- Life restoration of the Early Ordovician-Silurian trilobite Bumastus
  †Bumastus
- †Calamites
  - †Calamites cistii
  - †Calamites undulatus
- †Callixylon
- †Calyptaulax
- †Camarotoechia
  - †Camarotoechia mutata
- †Cameroceras
- †Cartersoceras
- †Ceratopsis
- †Ceraurus
- †Chasmatopora
- †Chonetes
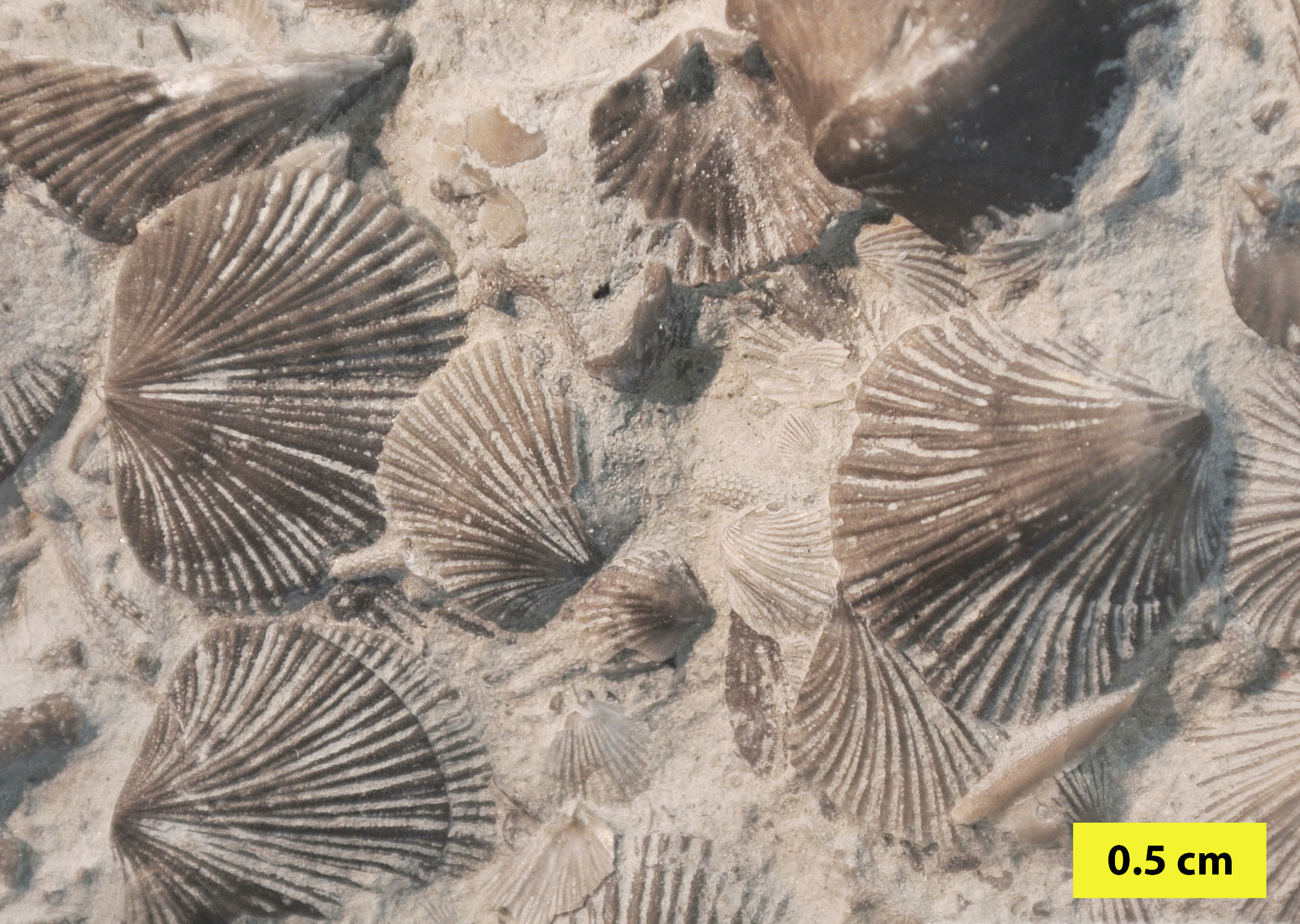
- Assemblage of fossilized shells of the Ordovician brachiopod Cincinnetina
  †Cincinnetina
  - †Cincinnetina meeki
  - †Cincinnetina multisecta
- †Cladochonus
  - †Cladochonus beecheri
  - †Cladochonus crassus
- †Cleiothyridina
  - †Cleiothyridina hirsuta
  - †Cleiothyridina sublamellosa
- †Climacograptus
- †Coenites
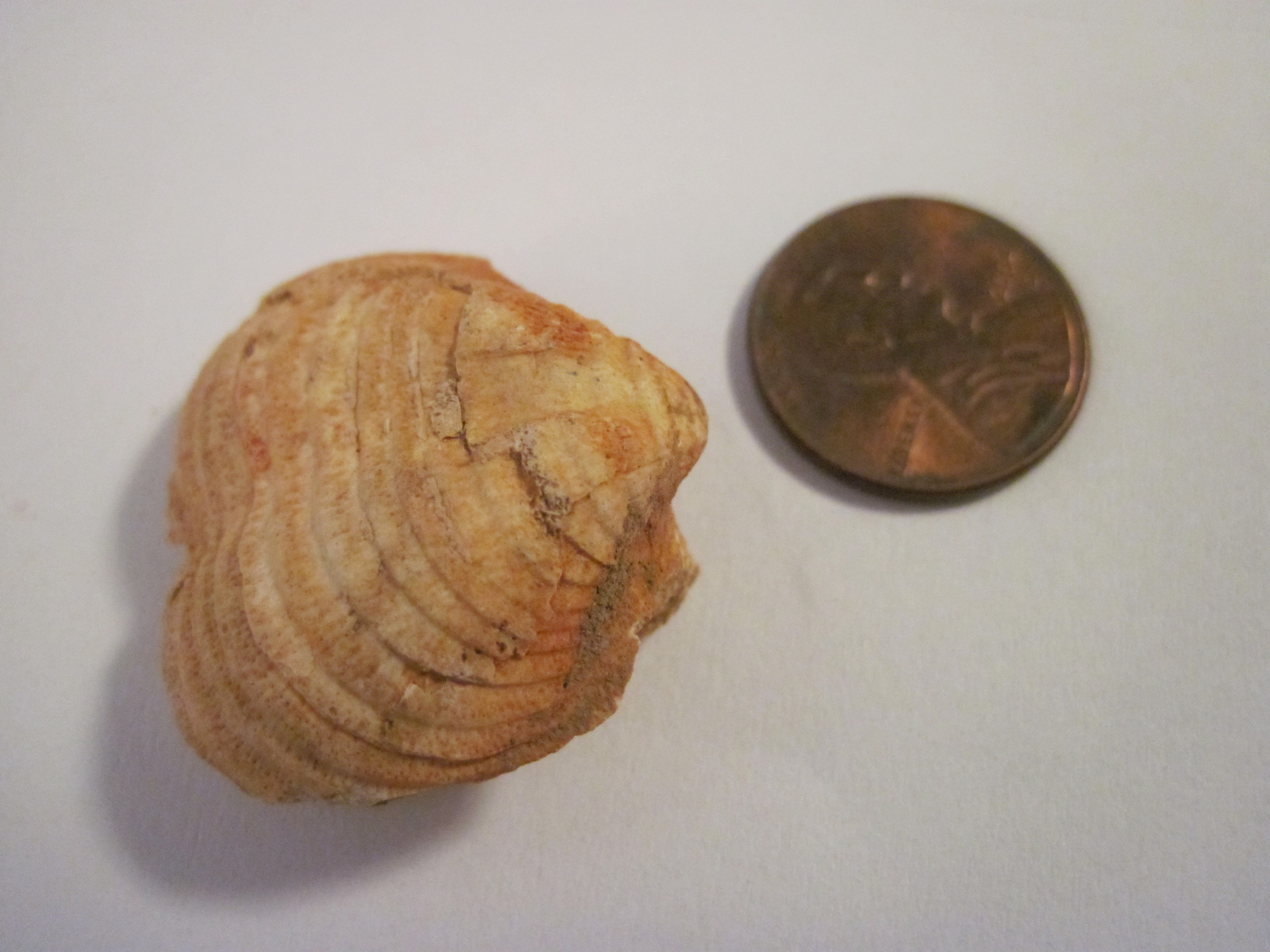
- Fossilized shell of the Late Devonian-Permian brachiopod Composita
  †Composita
  - †Composita subquadrata
  - †Composita trinuclea
- †Conostoma
- †Constellaria
- †Cordaites
- †Cornulites
- †Crania – tentative report
- †Craniops
- †Cyathocrinites
  - †Cyathocrinites glenni
  - †Cyathocrinites multibrachiatus
  - †Cyathocrinites parvibrachiatus
- †Cyclonema
- †Cydrocrinus
- †Cyphaspis
- †Cypricardinia
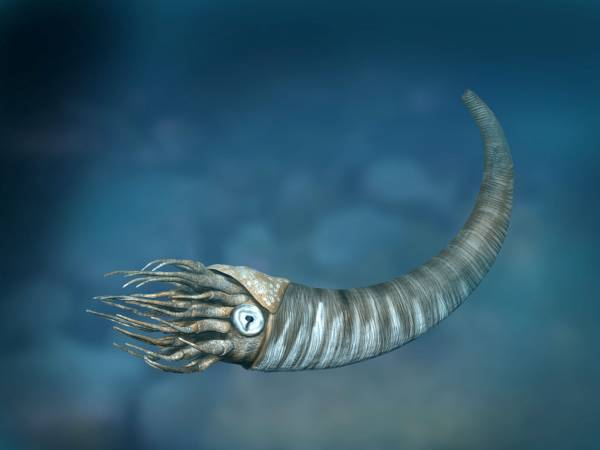
- Restoration of the Cambrian-Middle Devonian nautiloid cephalopod Cyrtoceras
  †Cyrtoceras
- †Cyrtolites
- †Cystodictya
  - †Cystodictya lineata
- †Decadocrinus
- †Declinognathodus
  - †Declinognathodus donetzianus
- †Diplograptus
- †Dizygocrinus
  - †Dizygocrinus whitei
- †Edmondia
- †Emmonsia
- †Endoceras
- Eocaudina
- †Eospirifer
- †Equisetum
  - †Equisetum arvense
- †Eretmocrinus
  - †Eretmocrinus magnificus
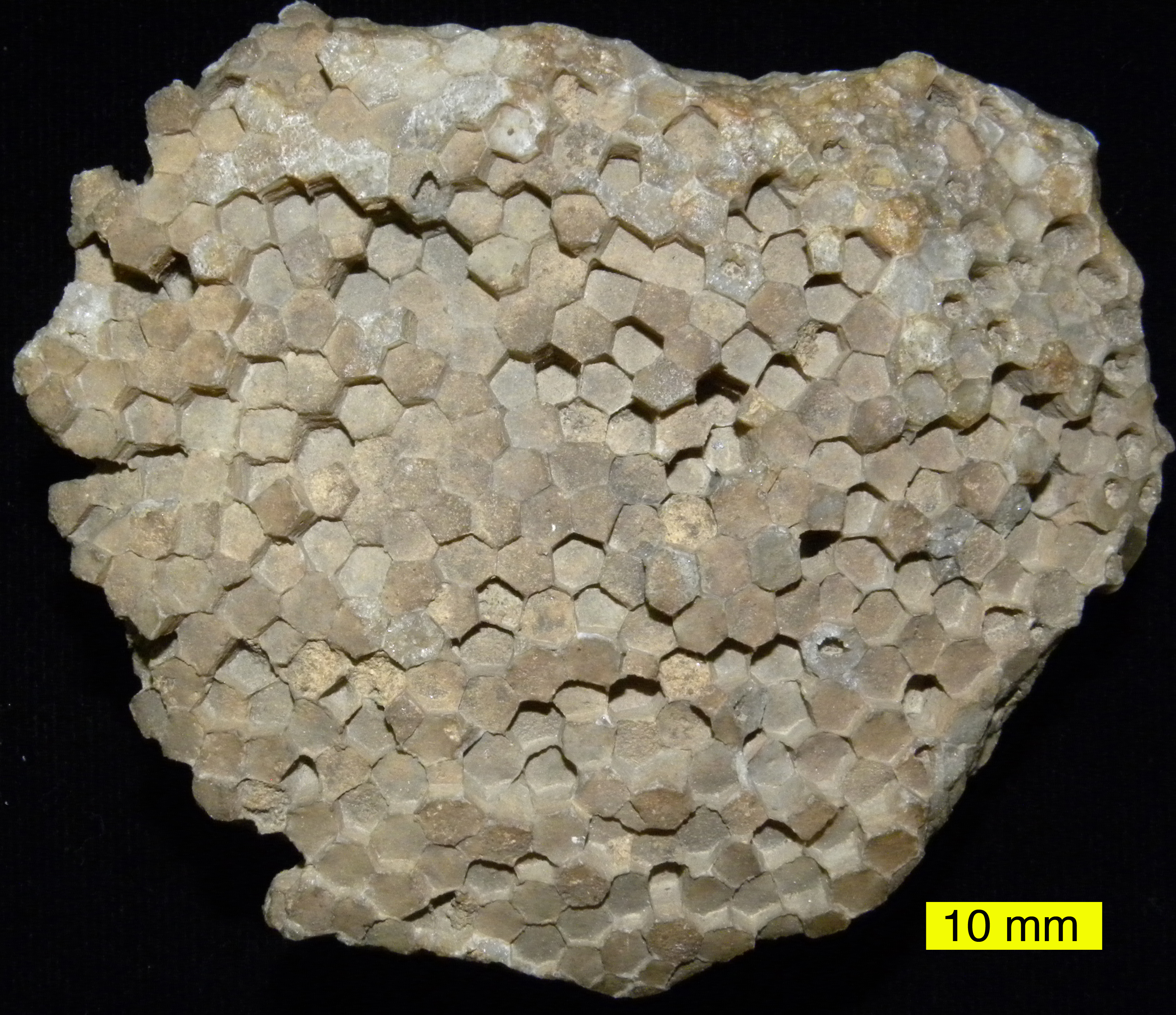
- Fossil of the Late Ordovician-Permian tabulate coral Favosites
  †Favosites
  - †Favosites arbor
  - †Favosites biloculi
  - †Favosites discoideus
  - †Favosites favosus
  - †Favosites hisingeri
  - †Favosites niagarensis
  - †Favosites proximatus
  - †Favosites quercus
  - †Favosites rotundituba
  - †Favosites turbinatus
- †Fenestella
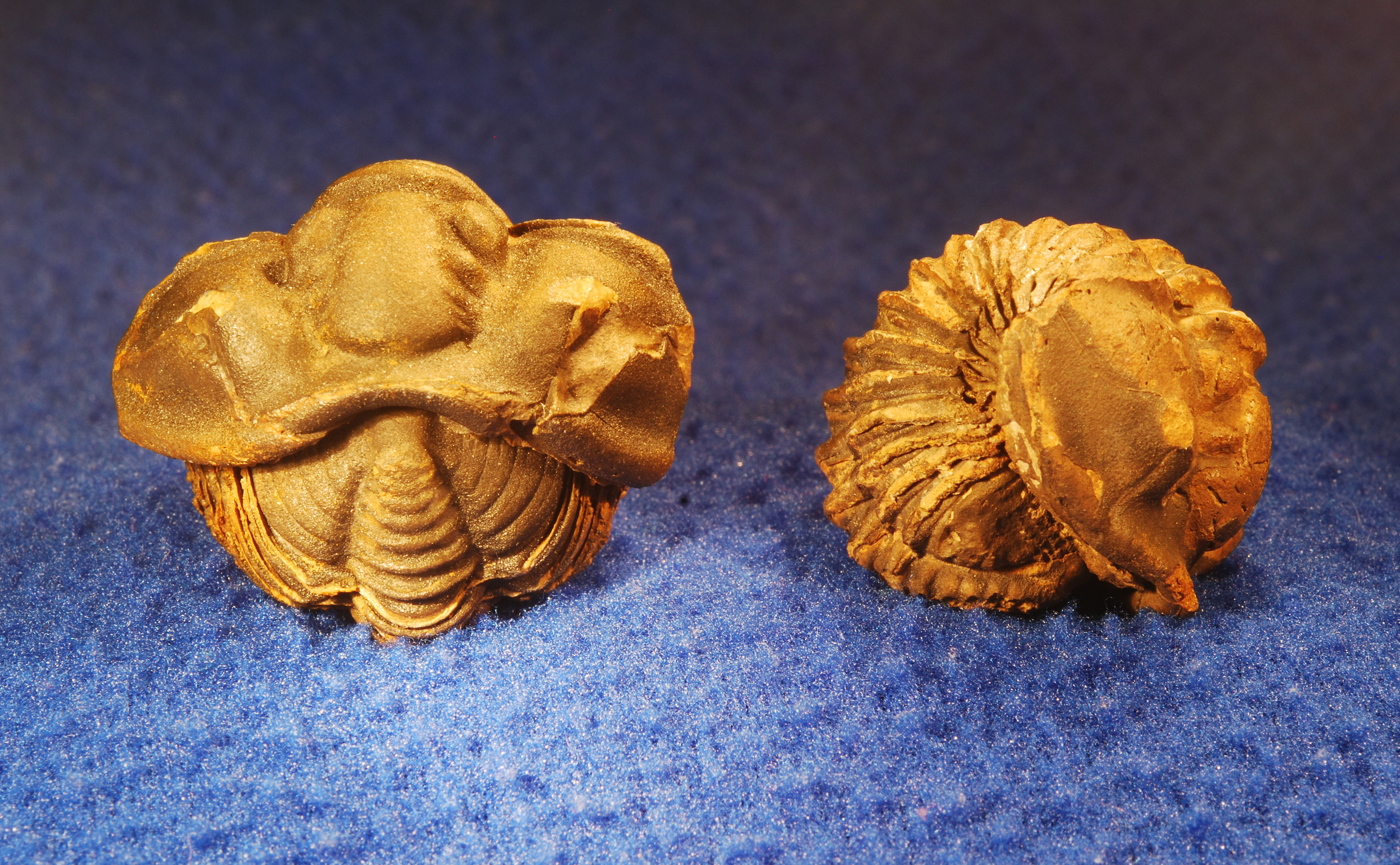
- Front (left) and right side (right) views of an enrolled fossil of the Middle Ordovician-Silurian trilobite Flexicalymene
  †Flexicalymene
  - †Flexicalymene meeki
- †Foerstia
- †Forbesiocrinus
- †Gastrioceras
- †Gilbertsocrinus
- †Glossina
- †Glyptocrinus
- †Glyptopleura
- †Gnathodus
- †Goniatites
- †Gravicalymene
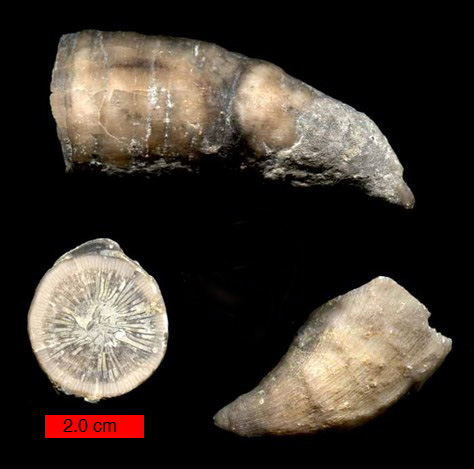
- Multiple views of a fossil of the Ordovician horn coral Grewingkia
  †Grewingkia
  - †Grewingkia rusticum
- †Hallia
- †Hallopora
- †Halysites
- †Heliophyllum
  - †Heliophyllum halli
- †Helminthochiton
- †Hindia
- †Holopea
- †Hyolithes
- †Idiognathoides
  - †Idiognathoides sinuatus
- †Iocrinus
- †Isotelus
  - †Isotelus gigas
  - †Isotelus maximus
- †Kazakhstania
- †Krausella
- †Lepidodendron
  - †Lepidodendron aculeatum – or unidentified comparable form
- †Lepidostrobus
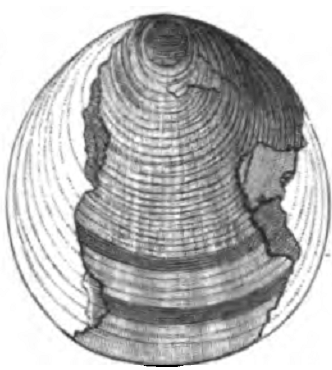
- Illustration of a fossilized shell of the Cambrian-Late Ordovician brachiopod Lingulella
  †Lingulella
- †Liroceras
- Lithophaga – tentative report
- †Maelonoceras
- †Masonoceras – type locality for genus
- †Maximites
- †Meristella
- †Meristina – tentative report
- †Michelinoceras
- †Murchisonia
- †Murrayoceras
- †Neospirifer
  - †Neospirifer cameratus
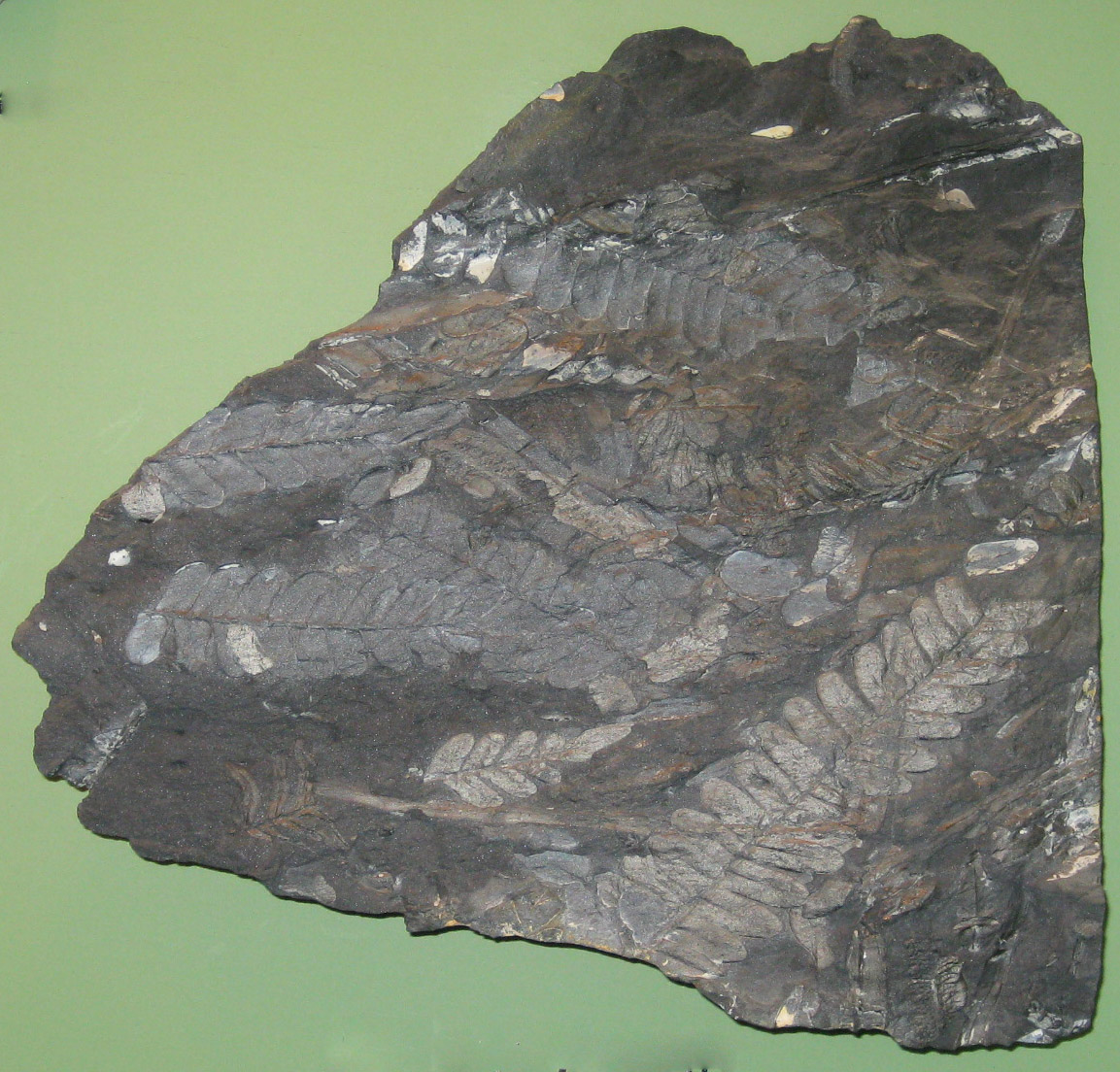
- Fronds of the Carboniferous seed fern Neuropteris
  †Neuropteris
  - †Neuropteris gigantea
  - †Neuropteris heterophylla
  - †Neuropteris tenuifolia – or unidentified comparable form
- †Oncoceras
- †Onychocrinus
- †Ormoceras
- †Orthoceras
- †Pattersonia
- †Pecopteris
  - †Pecopteris plumosa – or unidentified comparable form
- †Pentagonia
- †Pentamerus
- †Pentremites
  - †Pentremites tulipaformis
- †Periastron
- †Phillipsia
- †Phragmolites
- †Pitys
- †Plaesiomys
- †Platyceras
- †Platycrinites
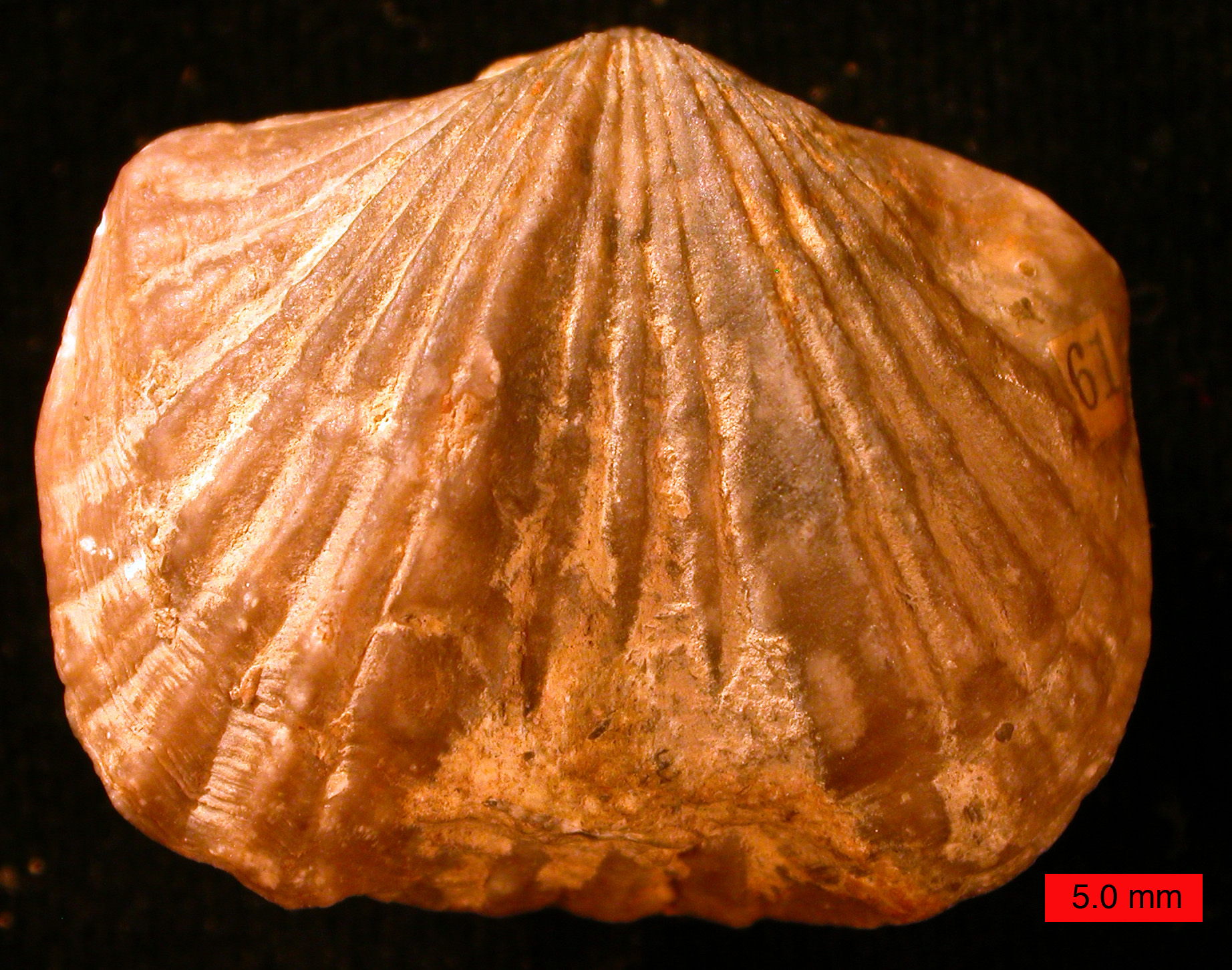
- Fossilized shell of the Middle Ordovician-Silurian brachiopod Platystrophia
  †Platystrophia
  - †Platystrophia acutilirata
  - †Platystrophia annieana
  - †Platystrophia clarkesvillensis
  - †Platystrophia clarksvillensis
  - †Platystrophia cypha
- †Plectoceras
- †Pleurodictyum
- Pleurotomaria
- †Polygnathus
  - †Polygnathus communis
- †Polygrammoceras
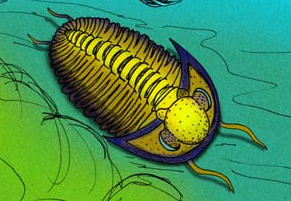
- Restoration of the Silurian trilobite Proetus
  †Proetus
- †Protosalvinia
- †Prototaxites
- †Pseudopolygnathus
- †Pterotheca
- †Quadratia
- †Scytalocrinus
- †Similodonta
- †Solenopora
- †Sowerbyella
- †Sphenophyllum
  - †Sphenophyllum cuneifolium
- †Sphenopteris
- †Sphenothallus
- †Spirifer
  - †Spirifer rockymontanus
- †Spiriferina
- †Stenaster
- †Stigmaria
- †Stigmatella
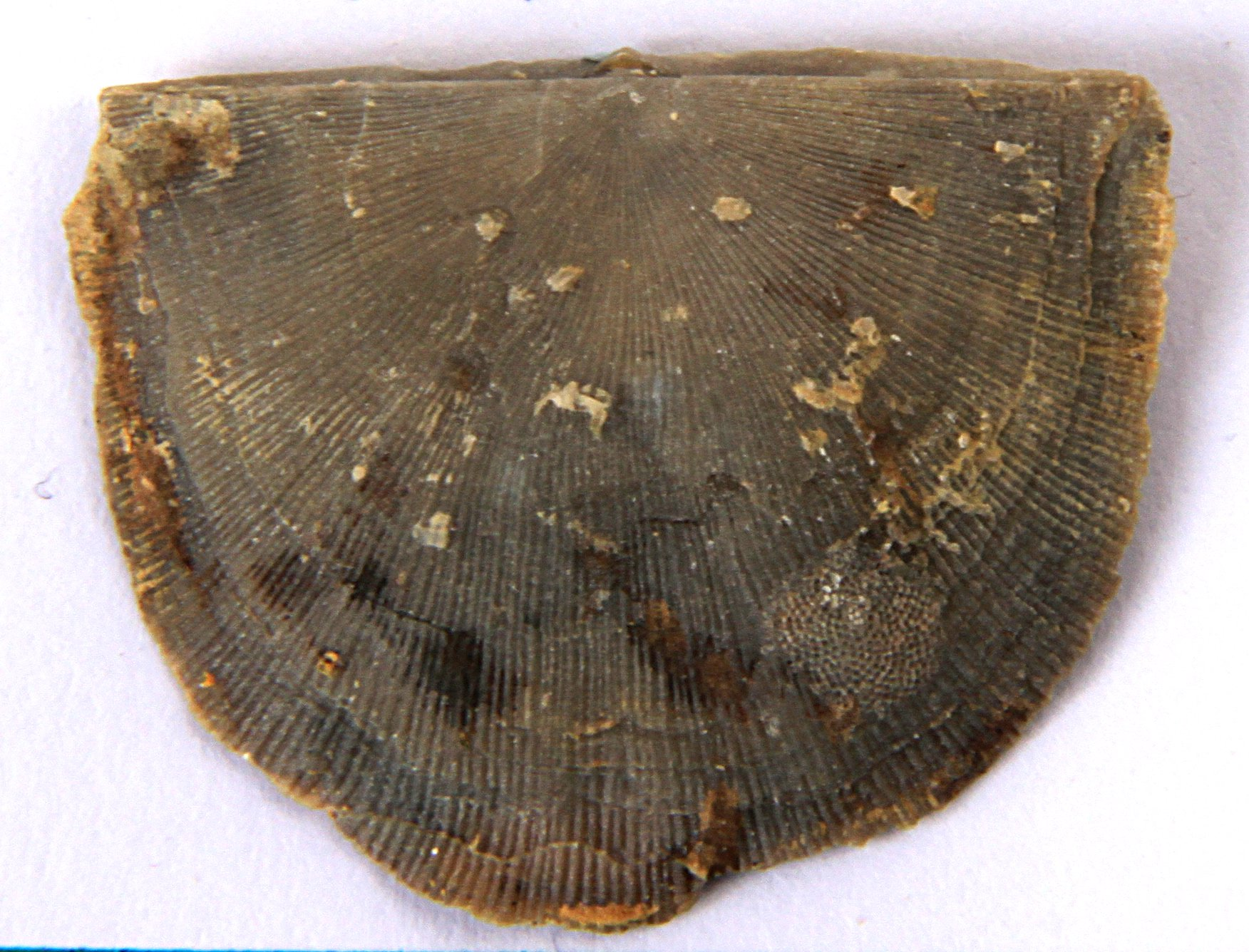
- Fossilized shell of the Ordovician-Silurian brachiopod Strophomena
  †Strophomena
  - †Strophomena concordensis
  - †Strophomena costellata – or unidentified comparable form
  - †Strophomena neglecta
  - †Strophomena planumbona
  - †Strophomena sulcata
- †Subulites
- †Syringopora
- †Taxocrinus
- †Tetradium
- †Theelia
- †Treptoceras
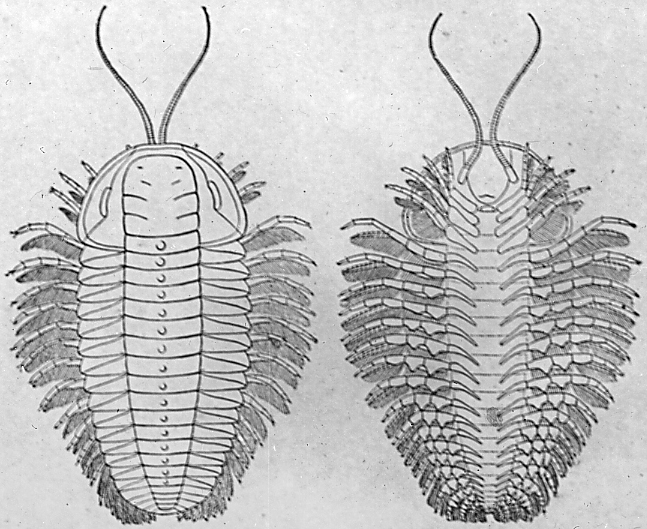
- Restoration showing the top (left) and underside of the Late Ordovician trilobite Triarthrus
  †Triarthrus
  - †Triarthrus eatoni
- †Triendoceras – tentative report
- †Trocholites
- †Ulrichicrinus
- †Whiteavesia
- †Worthenia
- †Zadelsdorfia – tentative report

== Mesozoic ==
The Paleobiology Database records no known occurrences of Mesozoic fossils in Kentucky.

== Cenozoic ==
- †Berhamniphyllum – type locality for genus
  - †Berhamniphyllum claibornense – type locality for species
- Canis
  - †Canis dirus
- †Diplotropis
  - †Diplotropis claibornensis – type locality for species
- Equus
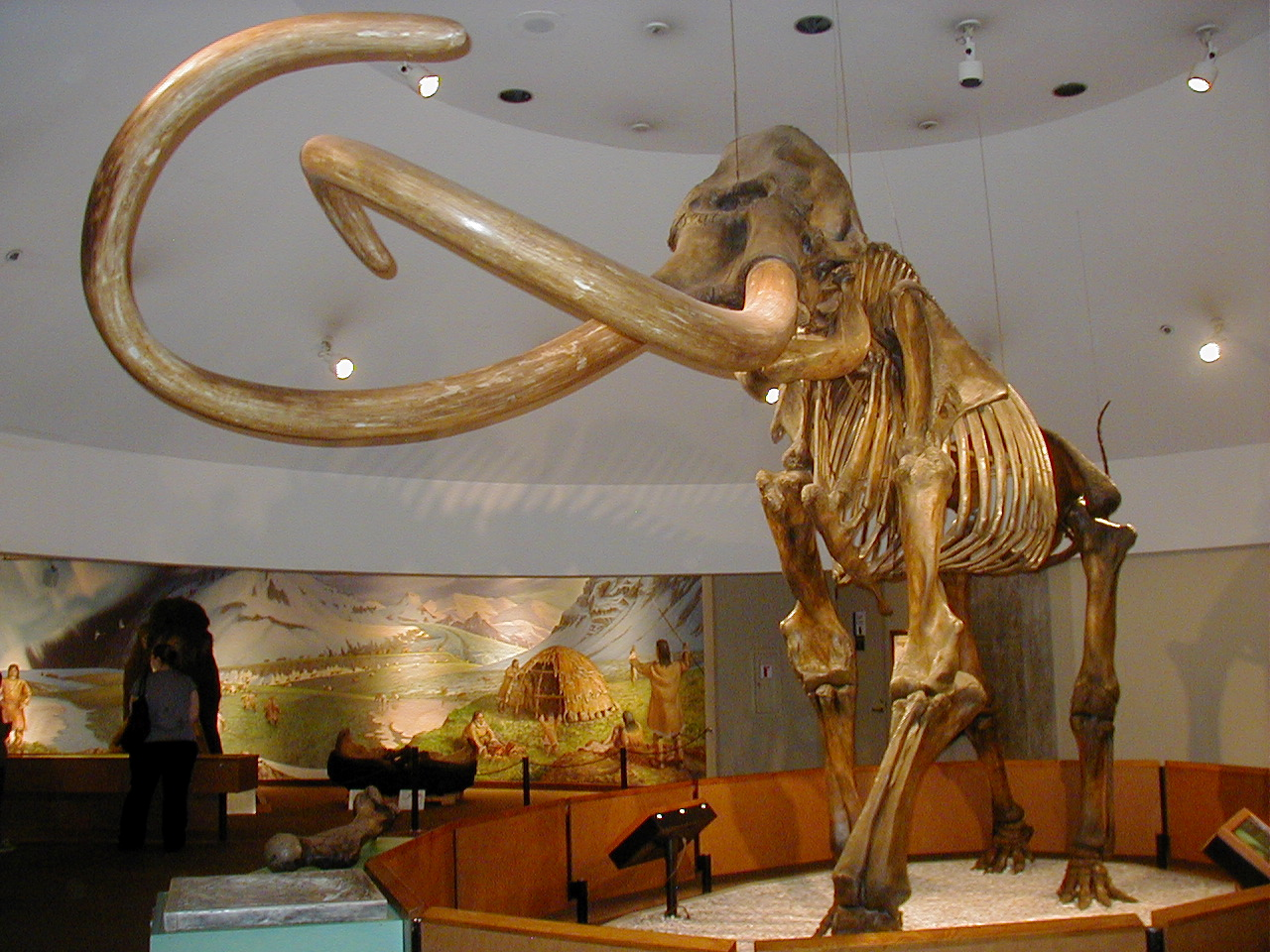
- Fossilized skeleton of the Pliocene-Holocene elephant relative Mammuthus, or mammoth
  †Mammuthus
- Microtus
  - †Microtus xanthognathus – or unidentified comparable form
- †Platygonus
- Spermophilus
  - †Spermophilus tridecemlineatus – or unidentified comparable form
- Taxidea
- Ursus
  - †Ursus arctos
