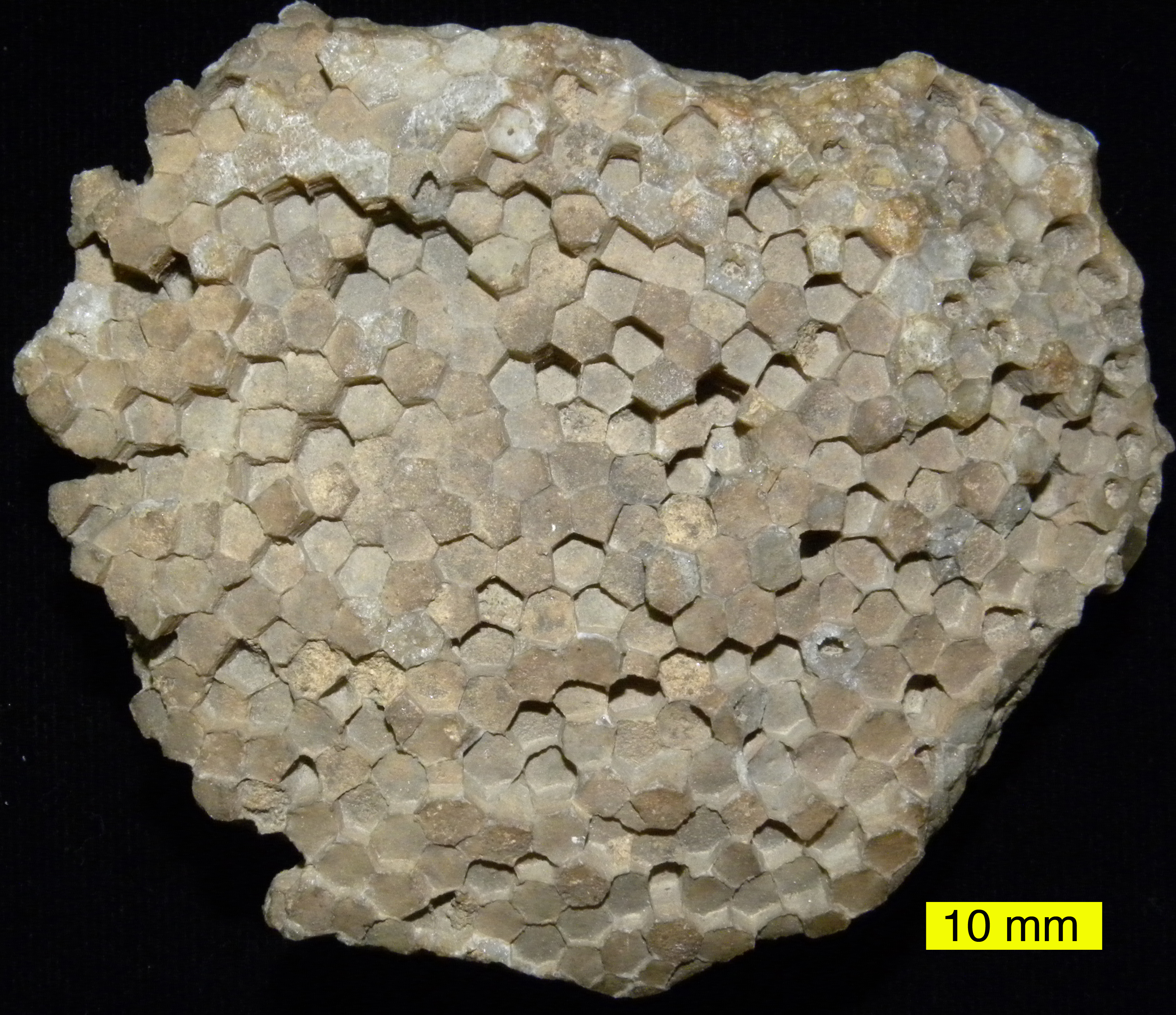
- Favosites sp. from the Upper Ordovician of southern Indiana, USA.

Scientific classification
- Domain: Eukaryota
- Kingdom: Animalia
- Phylum: Cnidaria
- Class: †Tabulata
- Suborder: †Favositida; Wedekind, 1937

Families
- †Coenitidae; †Favositidae; †Pachyporidae

= Favositida =

Favositida Temporal range: 471.8–252.0 Ma

Extinct suborder of corals

Favositida is an extinct suborder of prehistoric corals in the order Tabulata. These corals thrived from the Ordovician to the end of the Permian period, roughly between 471.8 and 252 million years ago. The fossil remains of Favositida species distinctly have honeycomb-like structure.
