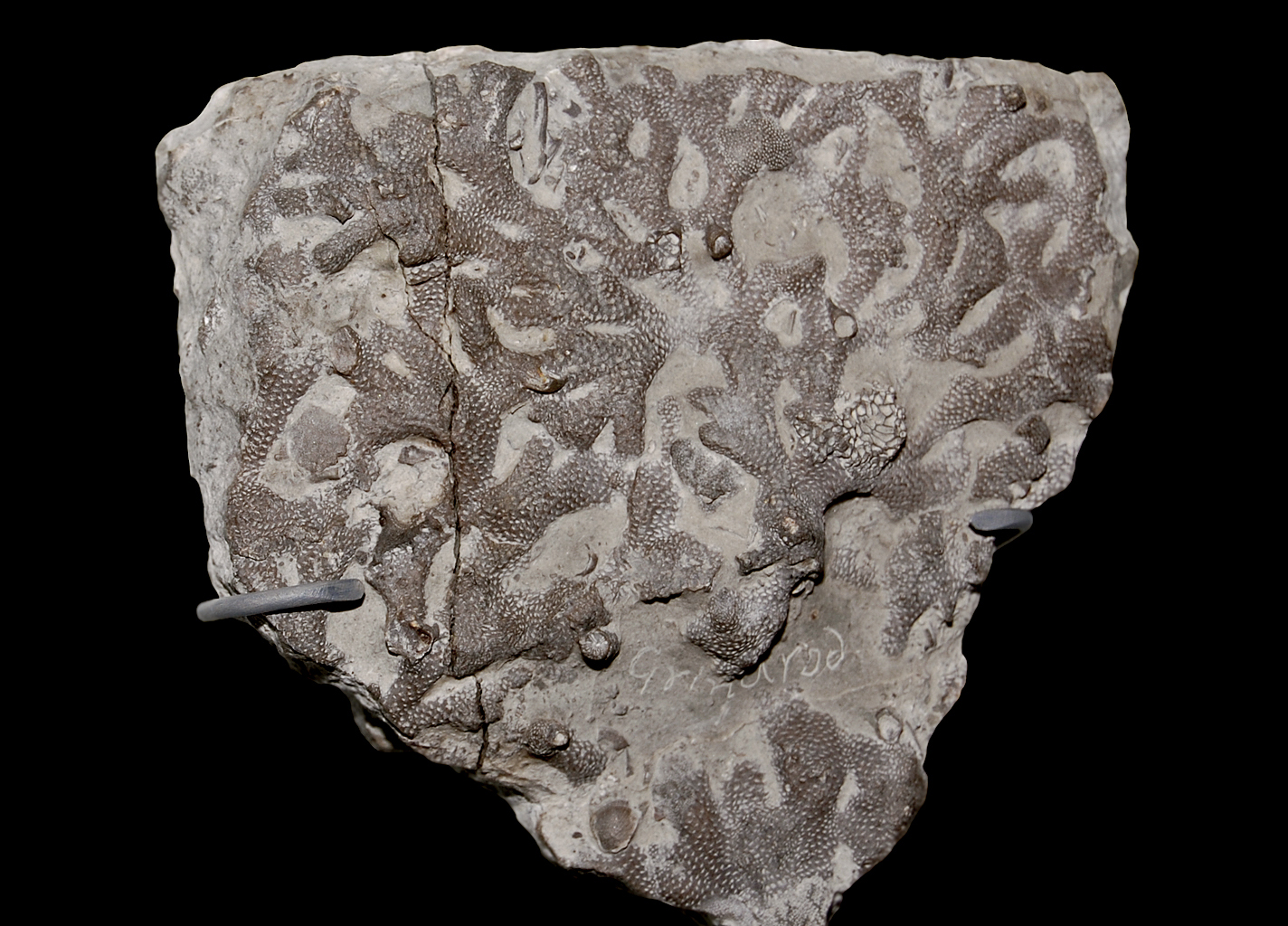

Scientific classification
- Domain: Eukaryota
- Kingdom: Animalia
- Phylum: Cnidaria
- Subphylum: Anthozoa
- Class: †Tabulata
- Suborder: †Favositida
- Family: †Coenitidae; Sardeson, 1896

Genera
- †Coenites; †Lecompteia; †Placocoenites; †Planocoenites; †Platyaxum

= Coenitidae =

Coenitidae Temporal range: 436.0–353.8 Ma

Extinct family of corals

Coenitidae is an extinct family of prehistoric corals in the order Favositida.
