= Phacellophyllum caespitosum =

Scientific classification
- Domain: Eukaryota
- Kingdom: Animalia
- Phylum: Cnidaria
- Subphylum: Anthozoa
- Class: †Rugosa
- Family: †Phillipsastreidae
- Genus: †Phacellophyllum
- Species: †P. caespitosum

Binomial name
- †Phacellophyllum caespitosum (Goldfuss) Masutomi, K. & Hamada, T., 1966

Extinct species of coral

Phacellophyllum caespitosum is an extinct species of tabulate coral.
