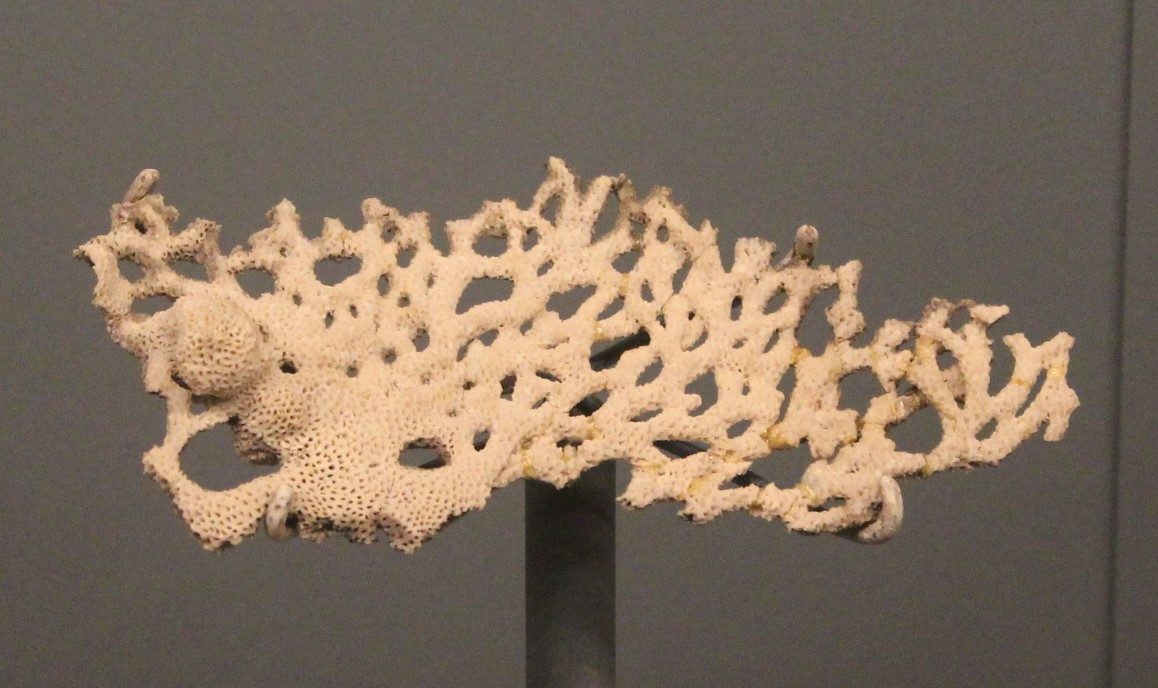
- C. laqueata fossil, University of Michigan Museum of Natural History

Scientific classification
- Domain: Eukaryota
- Kingdom: Animalia
- Phylum: Cnidaria
- Class: †Tabulata
- Family: †Coenitidae
- Genus: †Coenites; Eichwald, 1829

Species
- †Coenites dunginensis Sharkova, 1981; †Coenites elegans Mironova, 1974; †Coenites sharaobensis Sharkova, 1981

= Coenites =

Coenites Temporal range: 443.4–353.8 Ma

Extinct genus of corals

Coenites is an extinct genus of prehistoric corals in the family Coenitidae. C dublinensis occurs in the Columbus Limestone, a mapped bedrock unit consisting primarily of fossiliferous limestone, and it occurs in Ohio, Pennsylvania, and Virginia in the United States, and in Ontario, Canada.

== See also ==
- List of prehistoric hexacoral genera
