= Heliolites =

Heliolites Temporal range: Ordovician-Devonian
- Fossil specimen, Shanghai Natural History Museum

Scientific classification
- Kingdom: Animalia
- Phylum: Cnidaria
- Subphylum: Anthozoa
- Class: †Tabulata
- Order: †Heliolitida
- Family: †Heliolitidae
- Genus: †Heliolites; Dana, 1846

Genus of coral

Heliolites is a large and heterogenous genus of extinct tabulate corals in the family Heliolitidae. Specimens have been found in Ordovician to Devonian beds in North America, Europe, Africa, Asia, and Australia. The genus is particularly abundant in the Wellin Member of the Hanonet Formation of Belgium.

Members of the genus are distinguished by a prominent tubular coenenchyme (the tissue linking neighboring polyps) with 14–17 tubules around each corallite (the stony cup in which each polyp sits.)
