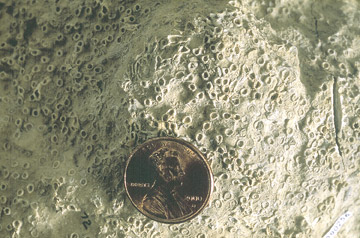
- Thamnoporella from the Beil Limestone Member, Lecompton Limestone, Greenwood County, Kansas

Scientific classification
- Kingdom: Animalia
- Phylum: Cnidaria
- Subphylum: Anthozoa
- Class: †Tabulata
- Family: †Pyrgiidae
- Genus: †Cladochonus; M'Coy 1847

= Cladochonus =

Cladochonus Temporal range: Pennsylvanian

Extinct genus of corals

Cladochonus is an extinct genus of tabulate coral that lived in the periods from Devonian to Permian.
