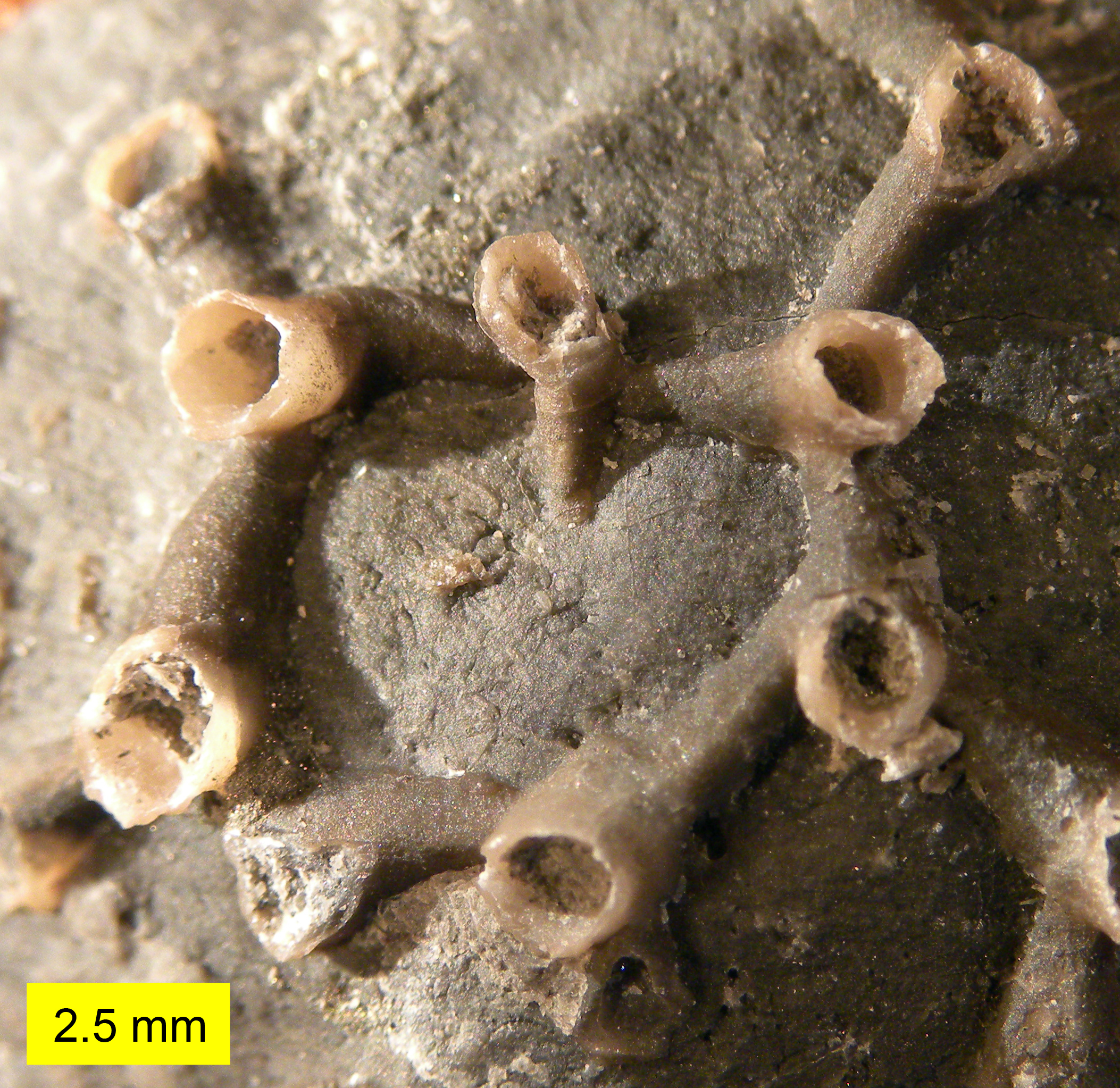
- Aulopora from the Silica Shale (Middle Devonian) of northwestern Ohio. Image shows colony origin encrusting a brachiopod.

Scientific classification
- Domain: Eukaryota
- Kingdom: Animalia
- Phylum: Cnidaria
- Class: †Tabulata
- Family: †Auloporidae
- Genus: †Aulopora; Goldfuss 1829

= Aulopora =

Aulopora Temporal range: Late Ordovician–Capitanian

Extinct genus of corals

Aulopora is an extinct genus of tabulate coral characterized by a bifurcated budding pattern and conical corallites. Colonies commonly encrust hard substrates such as rocks, shells and carbonate hardgrounds.
