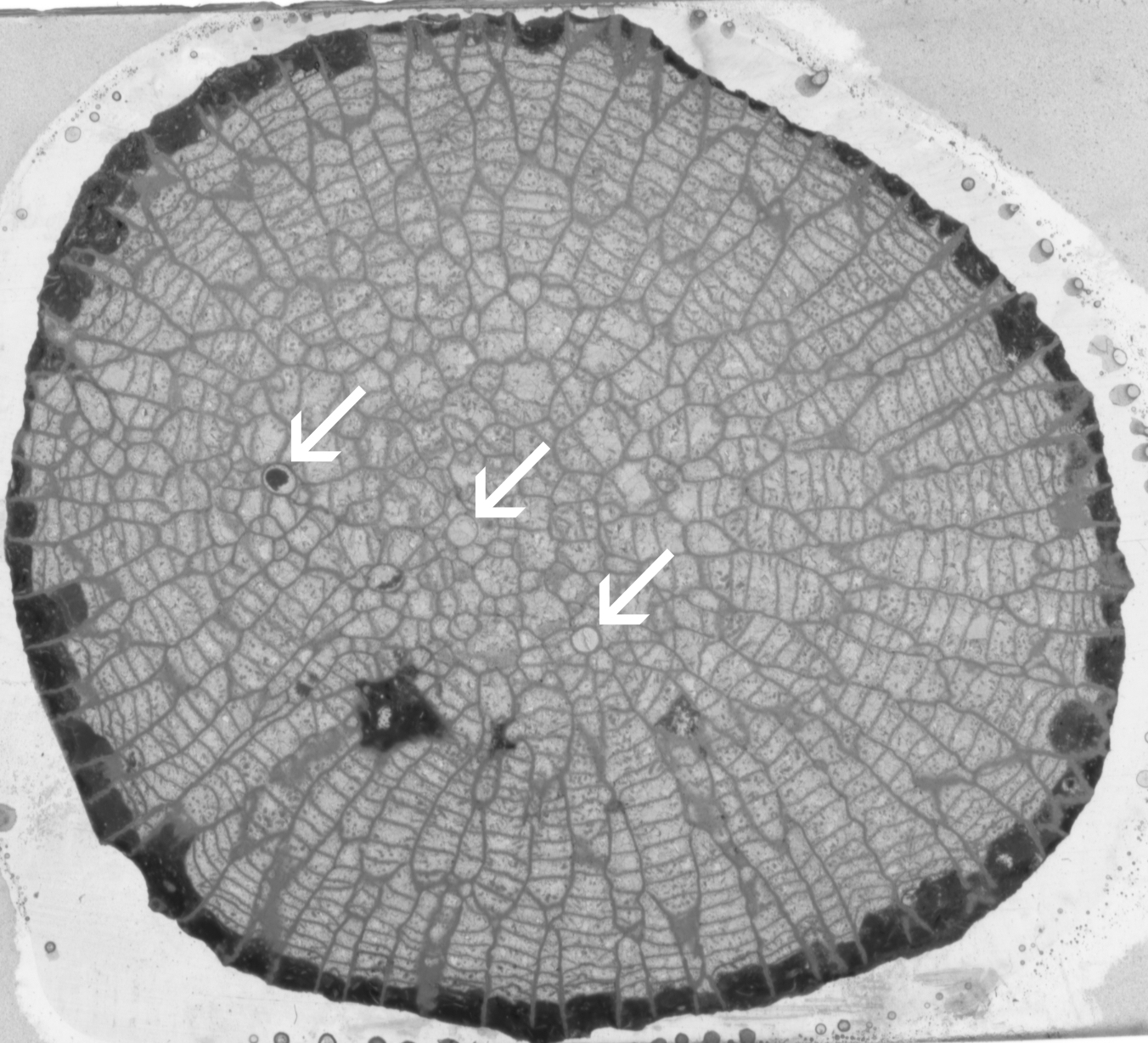
- Chaetosalpinx sibiriensis in Paleofavosites cf. collatatus, Bagovitsa A, Ukraine, Muksha subformation, Ludlow, transverse section, the arrows point to C. sibiriensis.

Trace fossil classification
- Ichnogenus: †Chaetosalpinx; Sokolov, 1948

= Chaetosalpinx =

Chaetosalpinx Temporal range: Late Ordovician–Devonian

Trace fossil

Chaetosalpinx is an ichnogenus of bioclaustrations (a type of trace fossil). Chaetosalpinx includes straight to sinuous cavities that are parallel to the host's axis of growth. The cavity is circular to oval in cross-section and it lacks a wall lining or floor-like tabulae. They are common in tabulate and rugose corals from Late Ordovician to Devonian of Europe and North America. They may have been parasites.

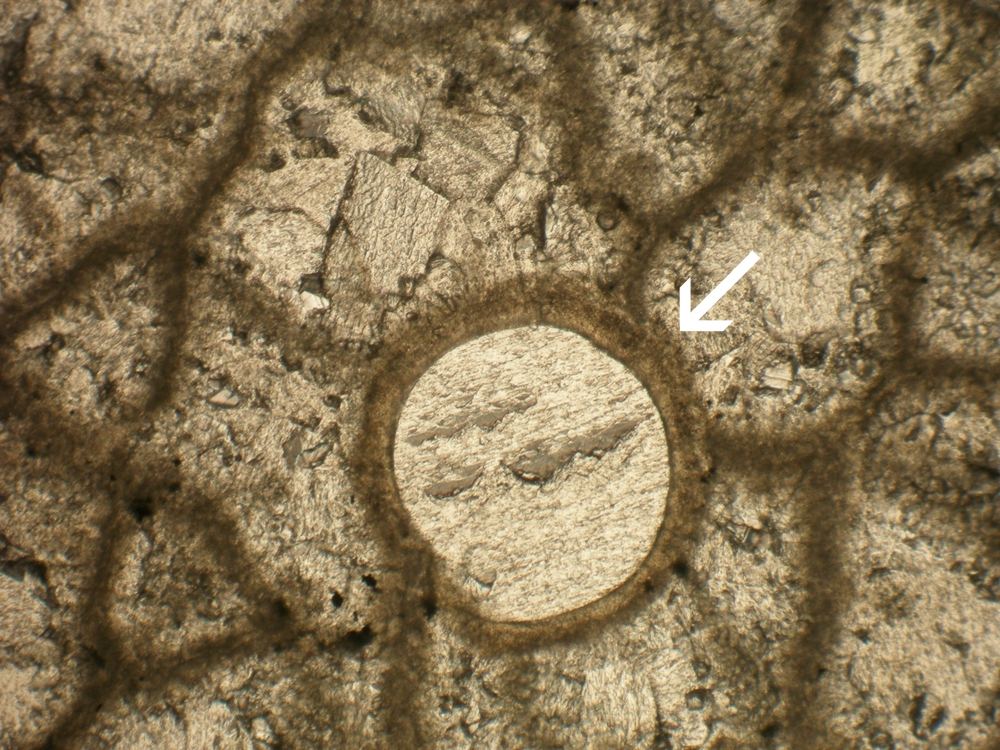
Chaetosalpinx sibiriensis in Paleofavosites cf. collatatus, Bagovitsa A, Ukraine, Muksha subformation, Ludlow, transverse section, the arrow points to C. sibiriensis
