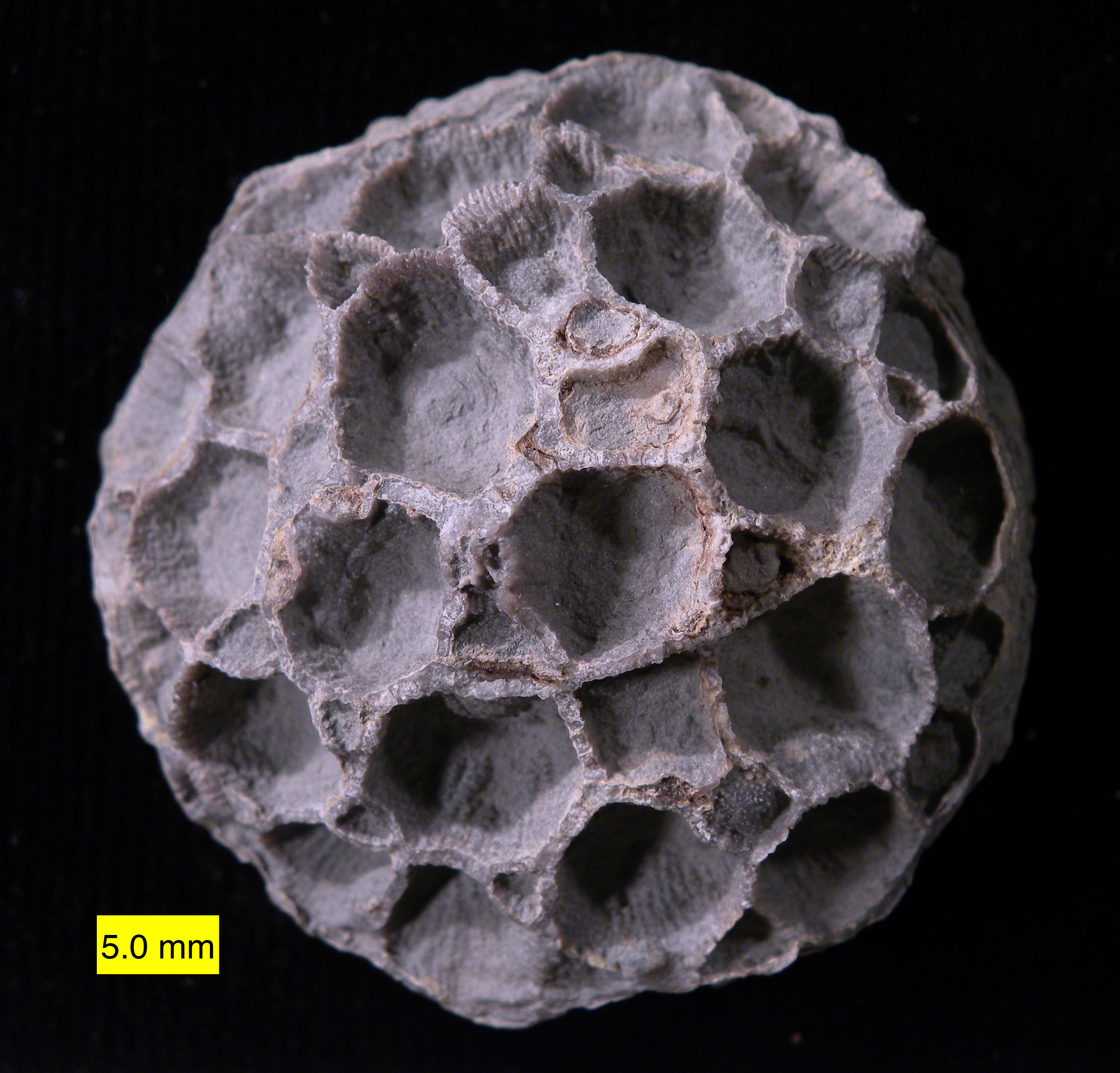
- P. americanum from the Givetian Kashong Shale (Hamilton Group) of Livingston County, New York
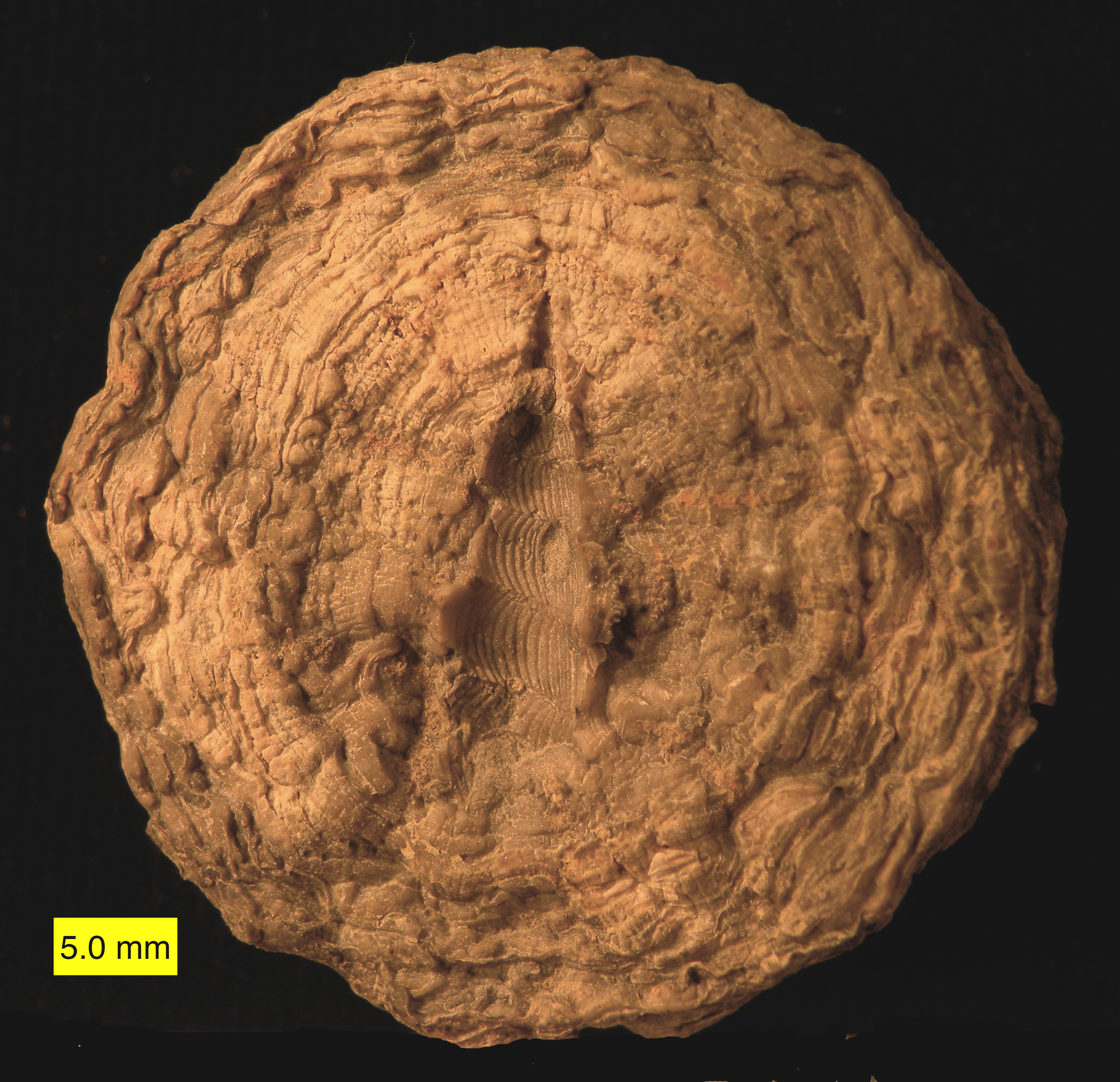
- Reverse side

Scientific classification
- Kingdom: Animalia
- Phylum: Cnidaria
- Subphylum: Anthozoa
- Class: †Tabulata
- Family: †Favositidae
- Genus: †Pleurodictyum; Goldfuss 1829
- Species: †P. americanum

Binomial name
- †Pleurodictyum americanum Roemer 1876

= Pleurodictyum =

Pleurodictyum Temporal range: Late Silurian-Early Carboniferous ~418–345 Ma

Extinct genus of corals

Pleurodictyum is an extinct genus of tabulate corals, characterized by polygonal corallites. Colonies commonly encrust hard substrates such as rocks, shells and carbonate hardgrounds.

== Distribution ==
Fossils of Pleurodictyum have been found in:

Silurian

Argentina, Australia, Bolivia, Tajikistan, and the United States (Kentucky, Wisconsin)

Devonian

Algeria, Australia, Belgium, Bolivia, Brazil, Canada (Ontario), China, Colombia (Floresta Formation, Altiplano Cundiboyacense), the Czech Republic, France, Germany, Luxembourg, New Zealand, South Africa, Spain, Tajikistan, Turkey, the United Kingdom, United States (Indiana, Kentucky, Michigan, New York, Ohio, Pennsylvania, Tennessee), and Venezuela

Carboniferous

Czech Republic, Mexico, and the United States (Georgia)
