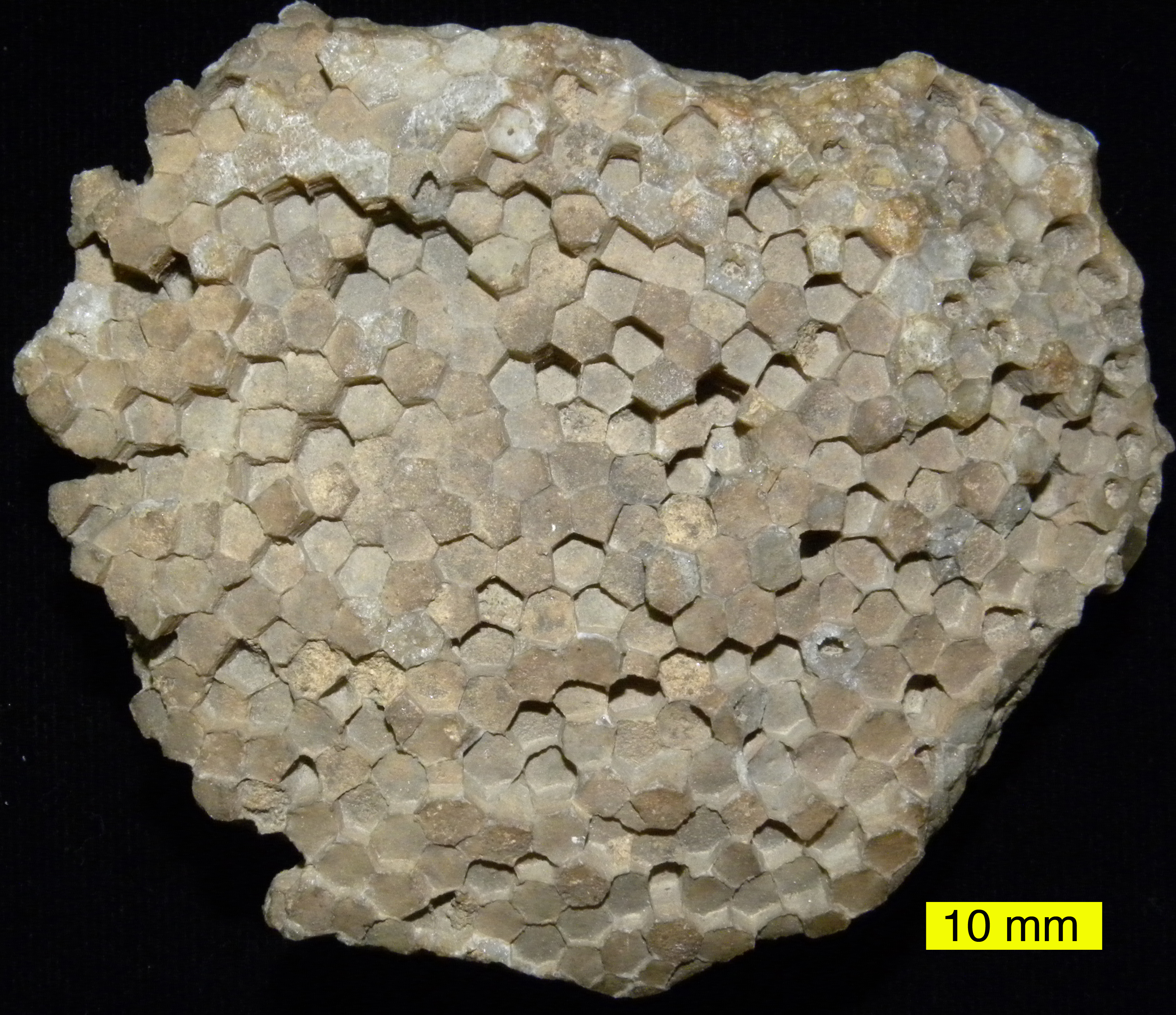
- Favosites sp. from the Upper Ordovician of southern Indiana

Scientific classification
- Kingdom: Animalia
- Phylum: Cnidaria
- Subphylum: Anthozoa
- Class: †Tabulata
- Family: †Favositidae
- Genus: †Favosites; Lamarck 1816

Type species
- F. gothlandicus

Species
- See text

= Favosites =

Favosites Temporal range: Late Ordovician-Late Permian 456.1–265 Ma

Fossil genus of corals with densely packed, polygonal cells

Stereo image
Left frame
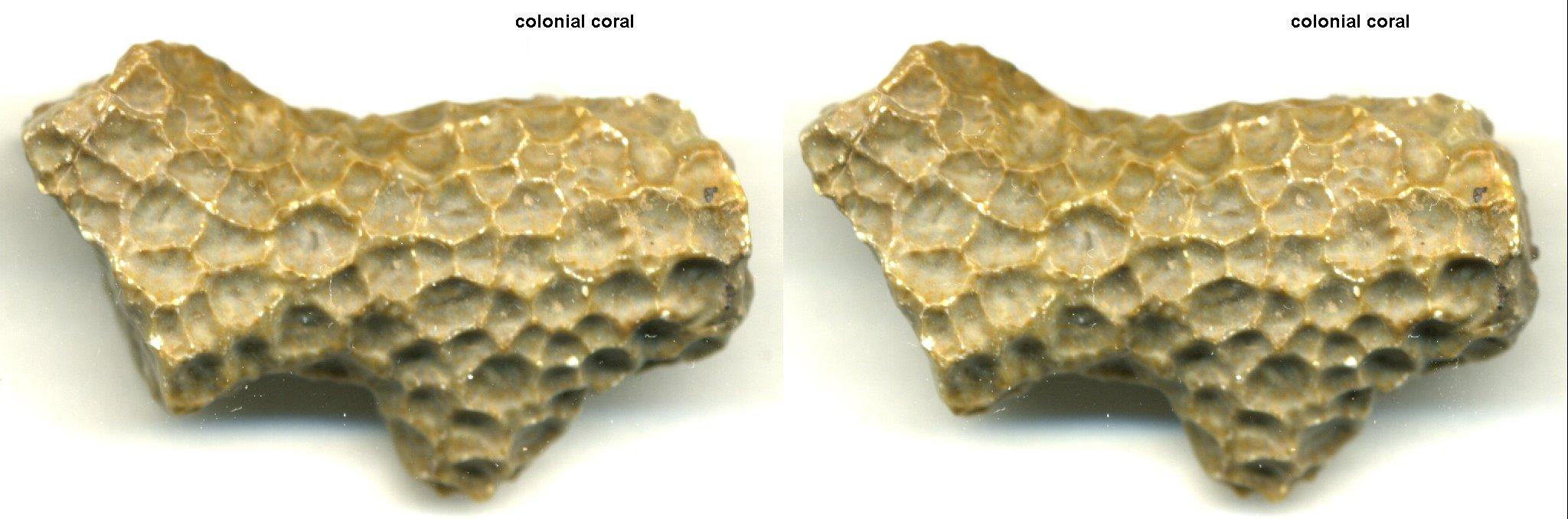
Right frame
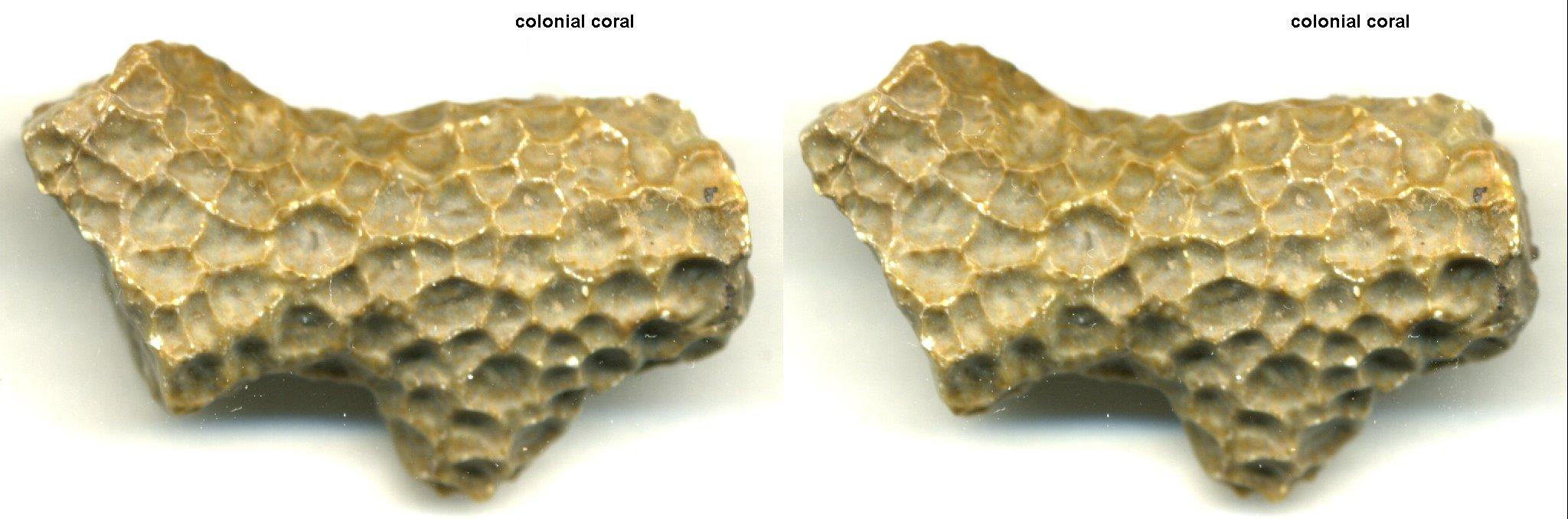
Parallel view
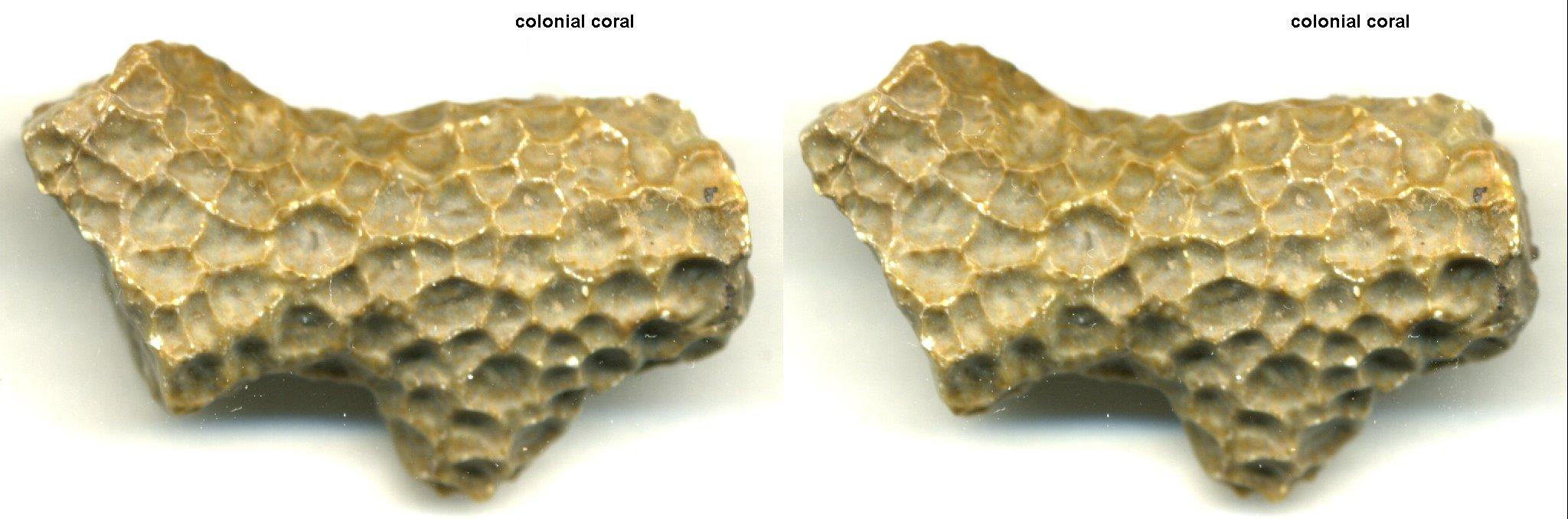
Cross-eye view
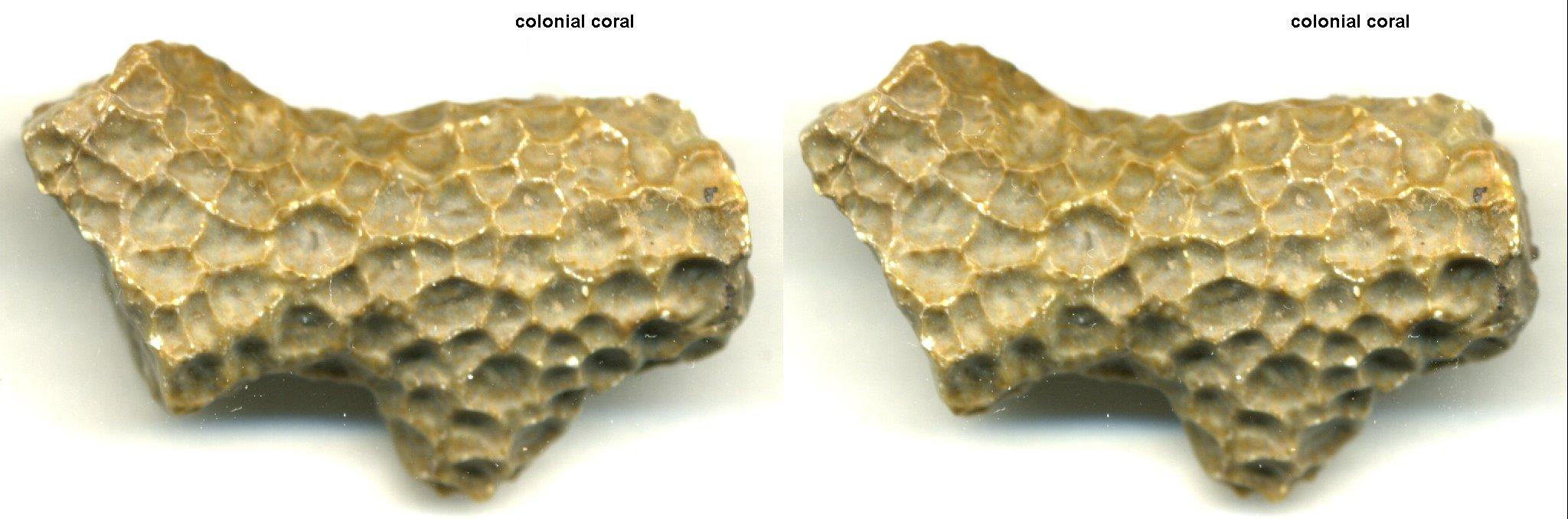

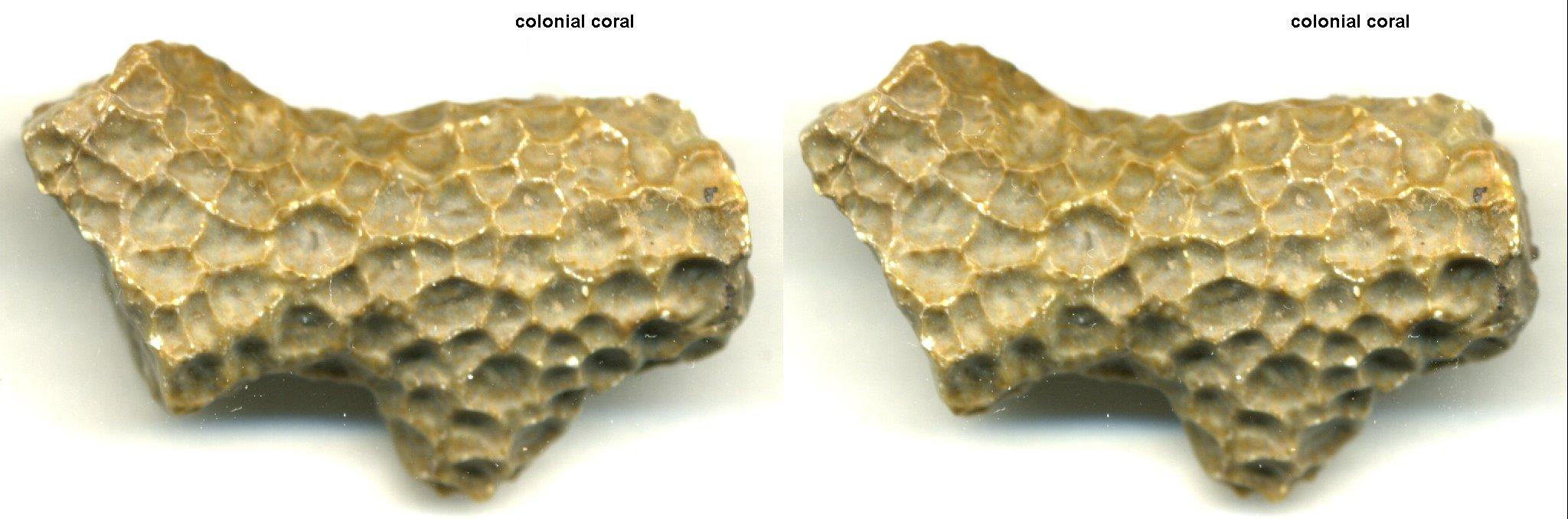
- More polished Favosites fossil.

Favosites is an extinct genus of tabulate coral characterized by polygonal closely packed corallites (giving it the common name "honeycomb coral"). The walls between corallites are pierced by pores known as mural pores which allowed transfer of nutrients between polyps. Favosites, like many corals, thrived in warm sunlit seas, feeding by filtering microscopic plankton with their stinging tentacles and often forming part of reef complexes. The genus had a worldwide distribution from the Late Ordovician to Late Permian.

== Distribution ==
Favosites had a vast distribution, and its fossils can be found on every continent (except Antarctica).

== Species ==
The following species of Favosites have been described:

- F. abnormis
- F. adaverensis
- F. afghanicus
- F. antiquus
- F. bowerbanki
- F. burkhanensis
- F. desolatus
- F. exilis
- F. fallax
- F. favosiformis
- F. favosus
- F. fusiforme
- F. goldfussi (Lecompte, 1939), from the Emsian, Eifelian and Givetian of the Holy Cross Mountains, is known to be parasitized by Chaetosalpinx.
- F. gothlandicus
- F. hisingeri
- F. ingens
- F. intricatus
- F. issensis
- F. jaaniensis
- F. kalevi
- F. lichenarioides
- F. mirandus
- F. multicarinatus
- F. oculiporoides
- F. permica
- F. petropolitana
- F. praemaximus
- F. privatus
- F. serratus
- F. sphaericus (Počta, 1902) from the lower Blue Fiord and Disappointment Bay formations of Devonian Canada.
- F. subfavosus
- F. subforbesi

== Gallery ==
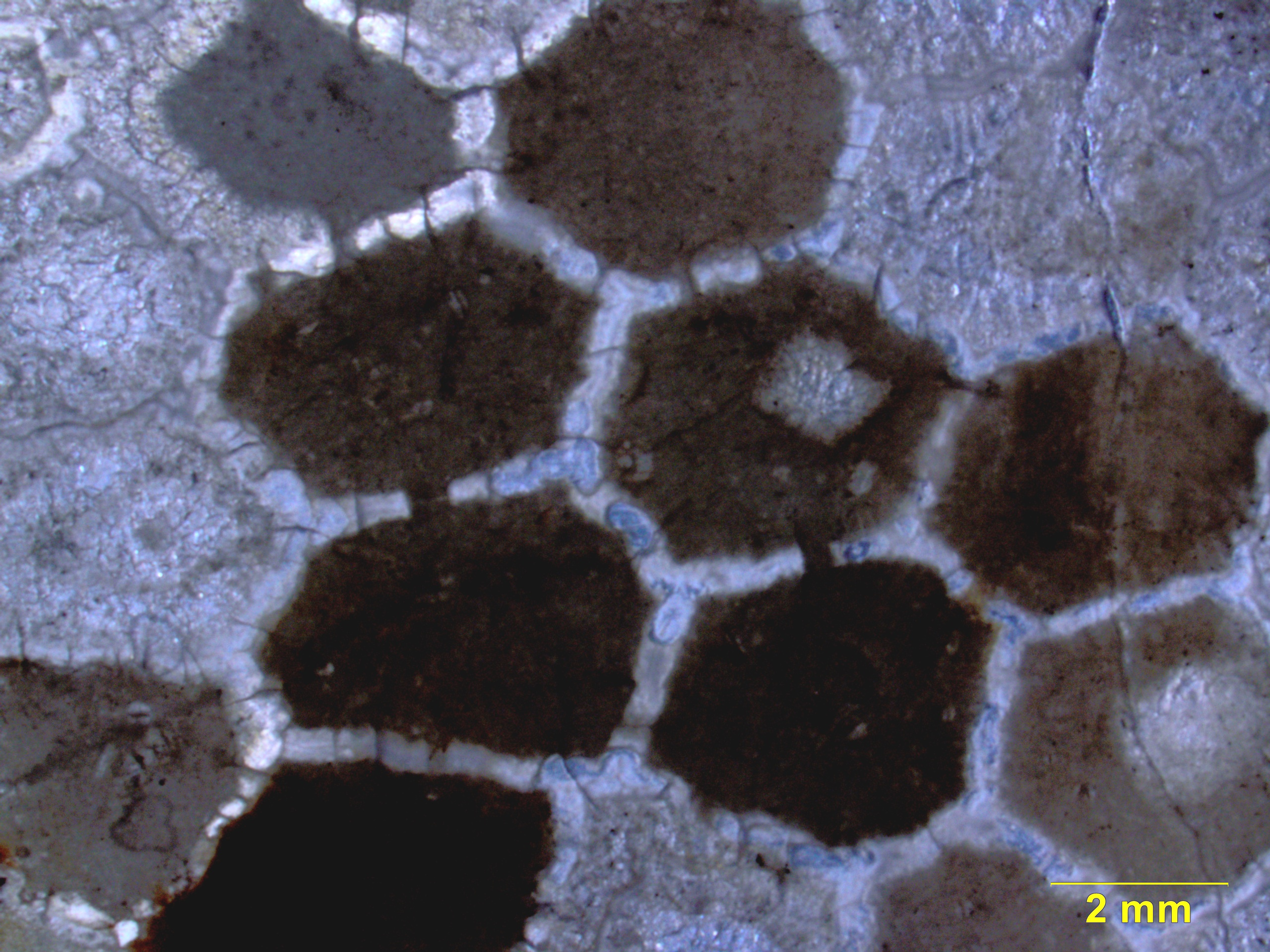
Sagittal cross-section of Favosites, showing communication pores between the corallites.
Upper Ordovician of southern Indiana

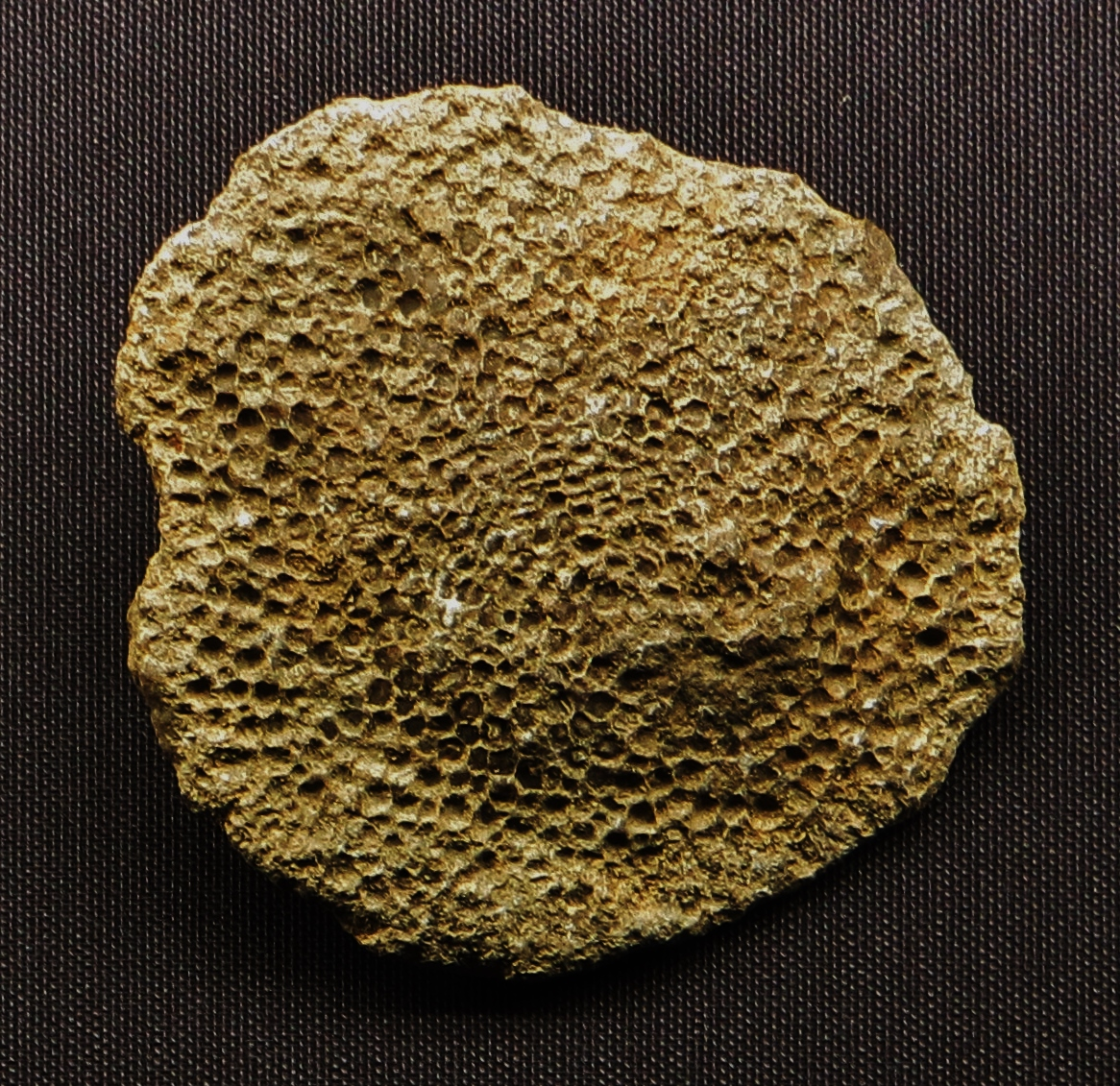
Favosites goldfussi fossil at Natural History Museum, Wiesbaden
