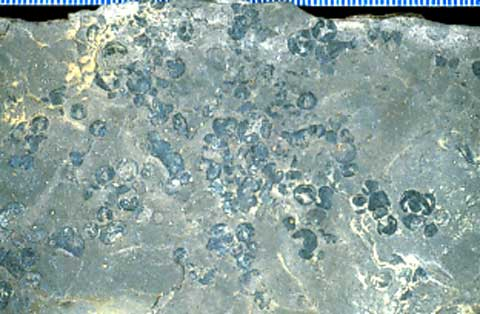
- Fossil of P. furcata from Devonian shale of Kentucky, USA.

Scientific classification
- Domain: Eukaryota
- Supergroup: Archaeplastida
- Clade: Viridiplantae
- Order: †Protosalviniales
- Family: †Protosalviniaceae
- Genus: †Protosalvinia; Dawson (1886)

Type species
- †Protosalvinia punctata (Newton) Dawson (1886)

Species
- †P. arnoldii; †P. bilobata Dawson ex Dawson (1886); †P. braziliensis (Dawson ex Clarke) Dawson 1886); †P. furcata (Dawson) Arnold (1954); †P. huronensis (Dawson) Dawson (1886); †P. ravenna White & Stadnichenko (1923); †P. punctata (Newton) Dawson (1886)

Synonyms
- Foerstia White (1923); Orvillea Lang (1945)

= Protosalvinia =

Protosalvinia Temporal range: Late Devonian

Devonian fossil plant of uncertain affinity

Protosalvinia is a prehistoric plant found commonly in shale from shoreline habitats of the Upper Devonian period. The name Protosalvinia is a misnomer. The name literally means early Salvinia, and was given in the erroneous belief that the fossils were an earlier form of the living aquatic fern Salvinia. It is no longer believed that the fossils come from a fern, but deciding exactly what the fossils represent is still a matter of debate.

The most likely interpretation of Protosalvinia is that it represents either a fossil liverwort or a brown alga, although no definitive brown algae have been identified from before the Tertiary period, and examination of the spore structure shows no features in common with living groups of brown algae. The living plant was a thallus with short dichotomous branching. The branches in the largest species were as much as one centimeter across. In some fossils, the branching lobes lie flat, but in others the tips of the branches are curled up over the fossil, giving it a round outline. Embedded in the tissues of the thallus are chambers in which spores (200 micrometre diameter) were produced by meiosis.

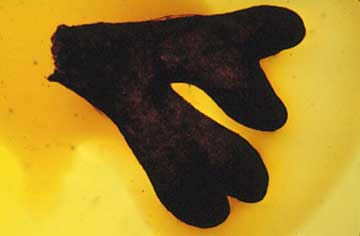
Microscope slide mount of Protosalvinia sp. showing bifurcating thallus.

Because Protosalvinia is usually preserved as a compression fossil, it can be difficult to determine whether its anatomy is more like a plant or an alga. Some biochemical evidence favors interpretation as an alga. Lignin and cutin have been found in the thallus, and sporopollenin in the spore walls. The grouping of the spores found in the thallus favors interpretation as a plant. The absence of any stomata on the surface is inconclusive, as all bryophytes lack stomata on the main body of the plant.

However, the tips of Protosalvinia branches show evidence of conceptacle-like dips.

Protosalvinia is found in association with conodont elements.

The relationships of Protosalvinia remain uncertain.
