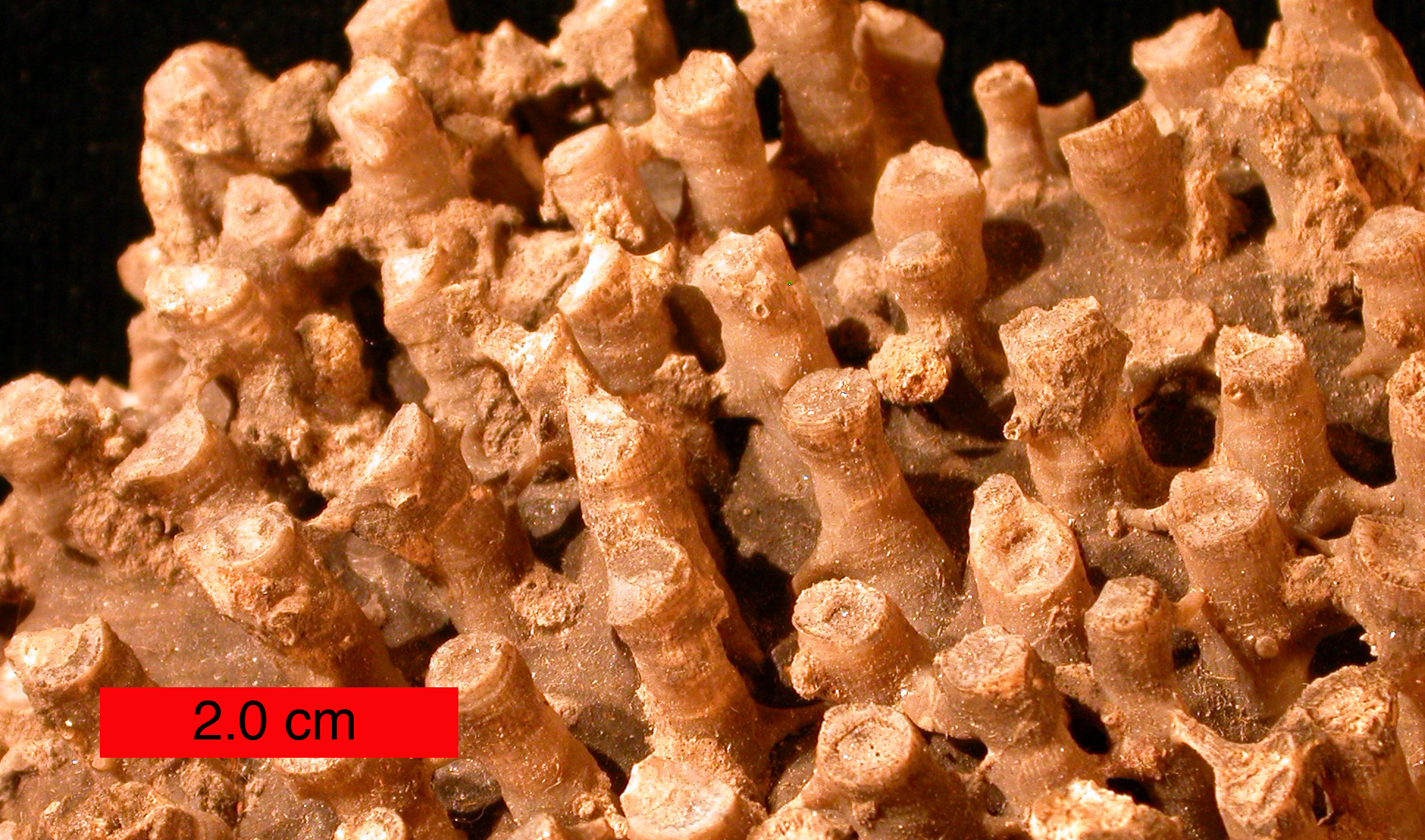
- Tabulate coral (a syringoporid); Boone Limestone (Lower Carboniferous) near Hiwasse, Arkansas. Scale bar is 2.0 cm.

Scientific classification
- Domain: Eukaryota
- Kingdom: Animalia
- Phylum: Cnidaria
- Subphylum: Anthozoa
- Class: †Tabulata

Orders
- Auloporida †; Favositida †; Halysitida †; Heliolitida †; Lichenariida †; Sarcinulida †; Syringoporida †; Tetradiida

= Tabulata =

Tabulata Temporal range: Ordovician–Permian

Class of extinct corals

Tabulata, commonly known as tabulate corals, is a class of extinct corals. They are almost always colonial, forming colonies of individual hexagonal cells known as corallites defined by a skeleton of calcite, similar in appearance to a honeycomb. Adjacent cells are joined by small pores. Their distinguishing feature is their well-developed horizontal internal partitions (tabulae) within each cell, but reduced or absent vertical internal partitions (septa). They are usually smaller than rugose corals, but vary considerably in shape, from flat to conical to spherical.

Around 300 species have been described. Among the most common tabulate corals in the fossil record are Aulopora, Favosites, Halysites, Heliolites, Pleurodictyum, Sarcinula and Syringopora. Tabulate corals with massive skeletons often contain endobiotic symbionts, such as cornulitids and Chaetosalpinx.

Like rugose corals, they lived entirely during the Paleozoic, being found from the Ordovician to the Permian. With Stromatoporoidea and rugose corals, the tabulate corals are characteristic of the shallow waters of the Silurian and Devonian. Sea levels rose in the Devonian, and tabulate corals became much less common. They finally became extinct in the Permian–Triassic extinction event.

== Gallery ==
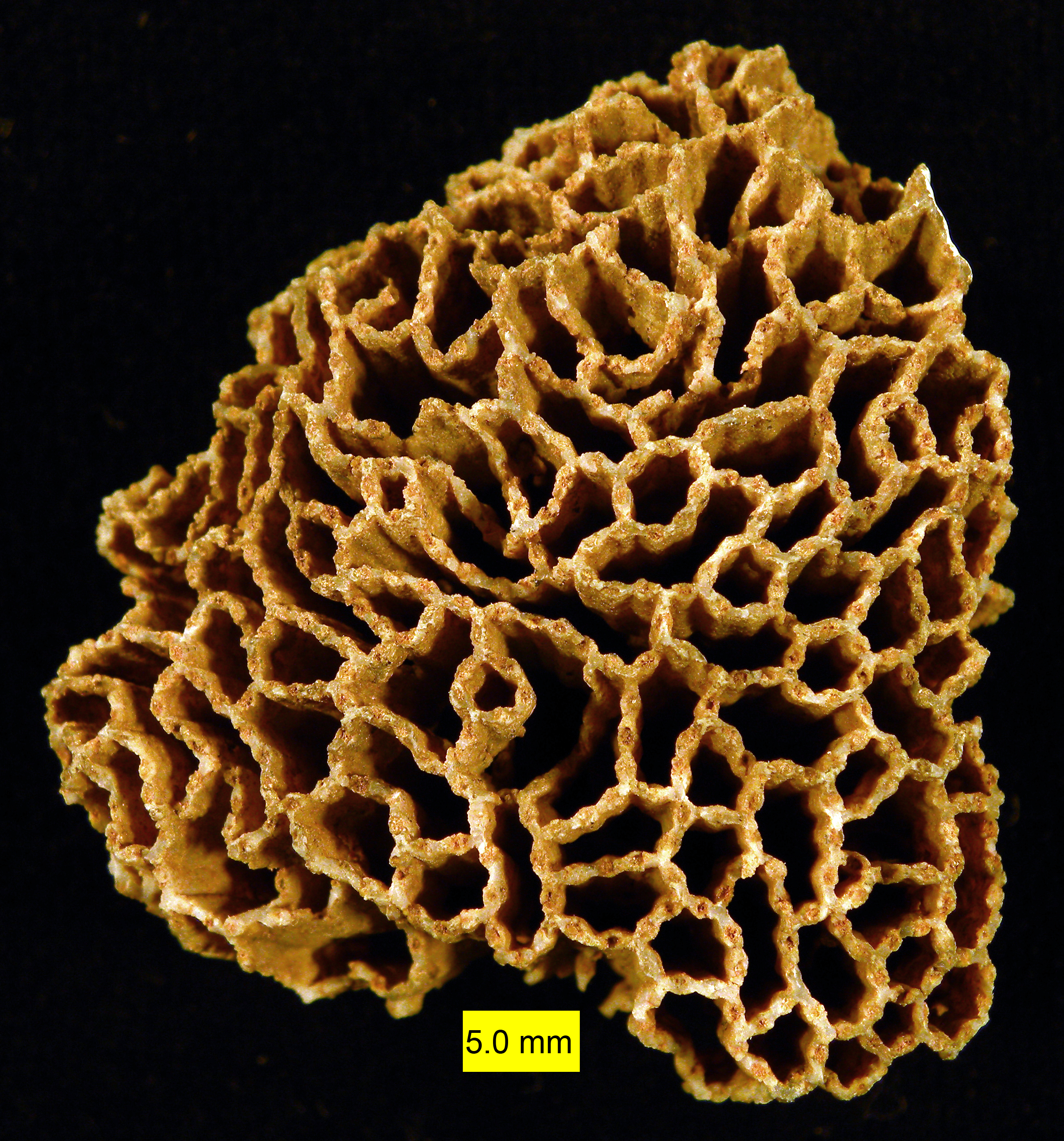
Halysites sp. from the Silurian of Ohio. View of colony surface.

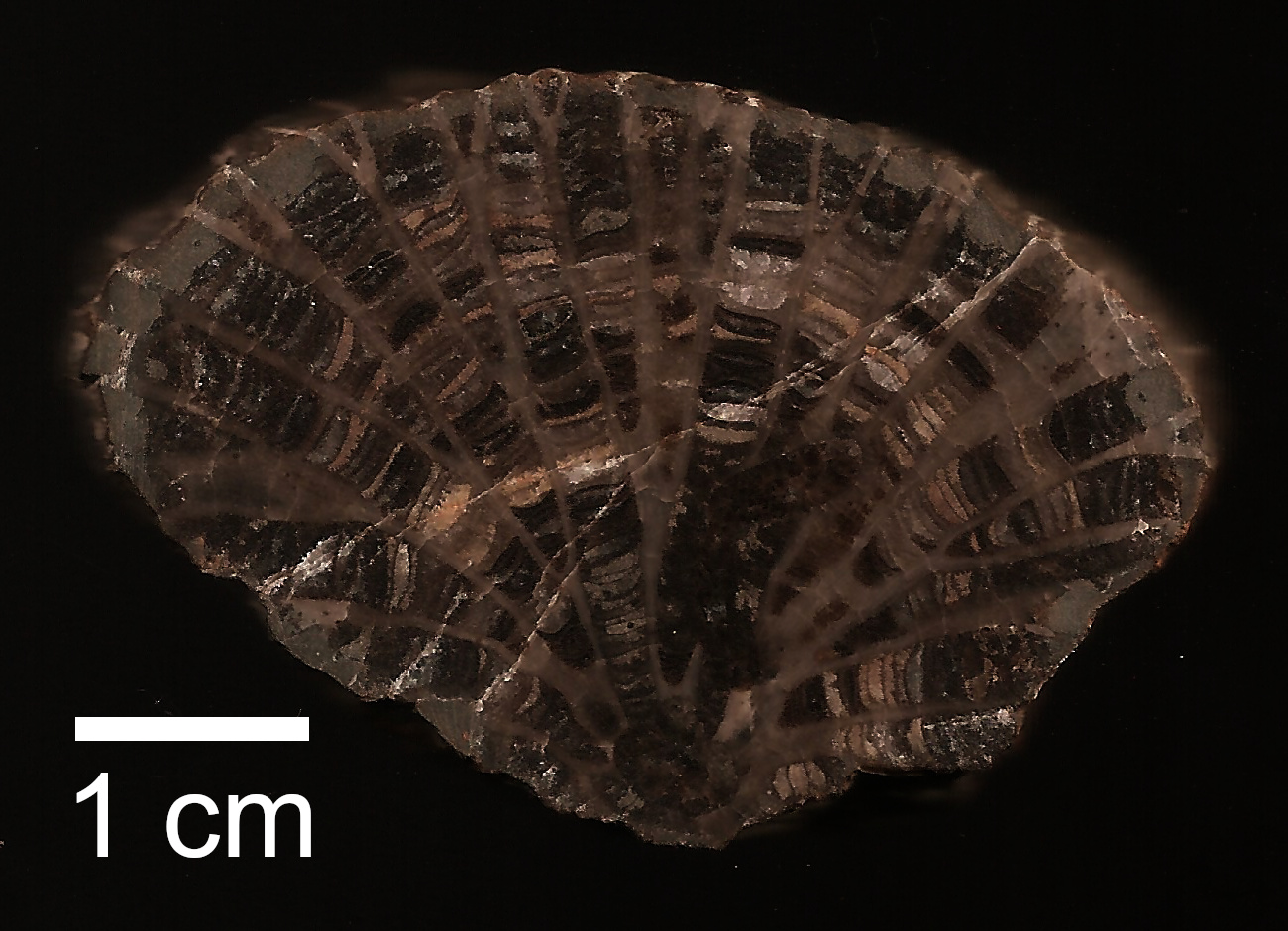
Etched section of an Ordovician tabulate coral

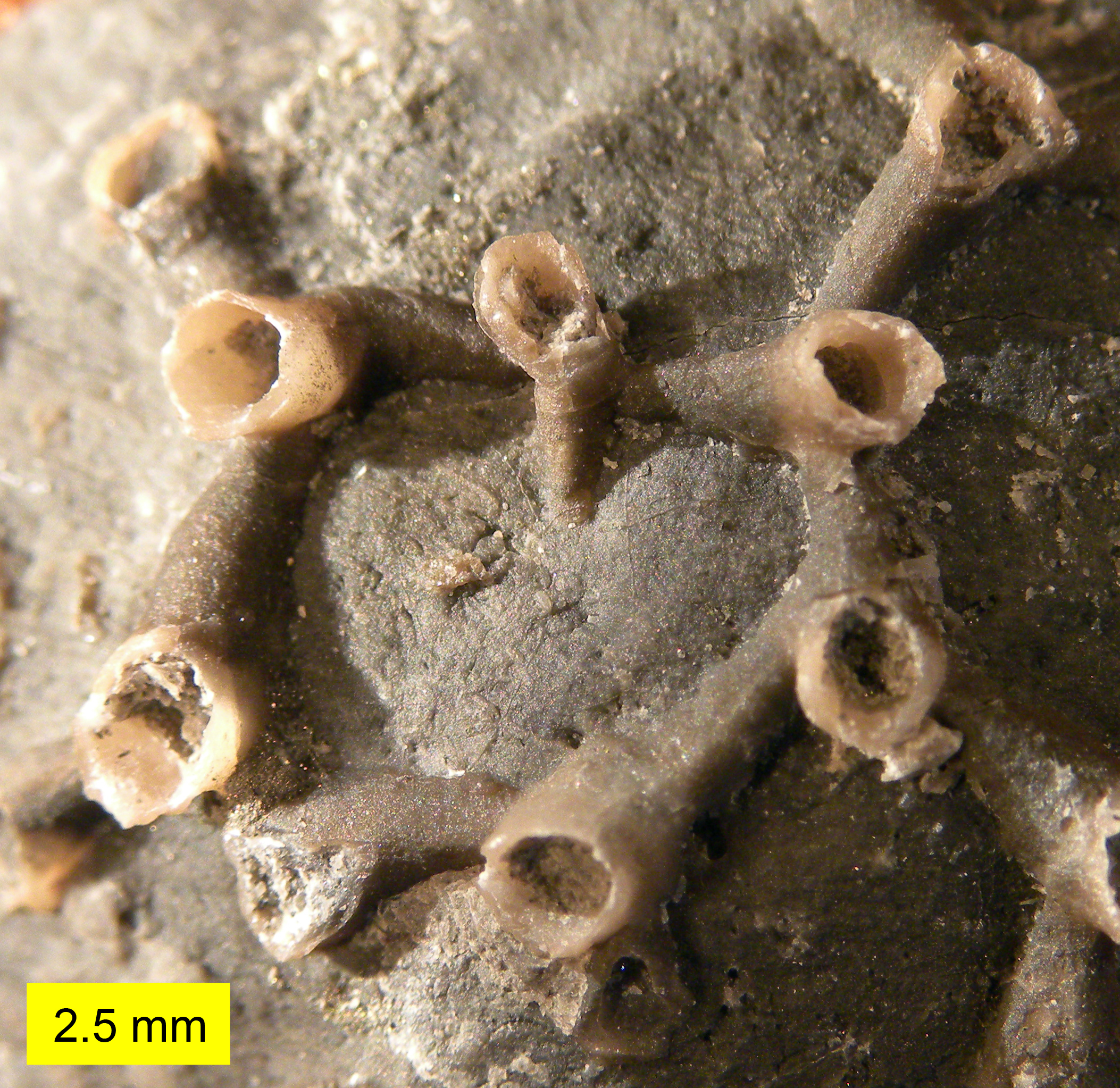
Aulopora from the Silica Shale (Middle Devonian) of northwestern Ohio. Image shows colony origin encrusting a brachiopod.

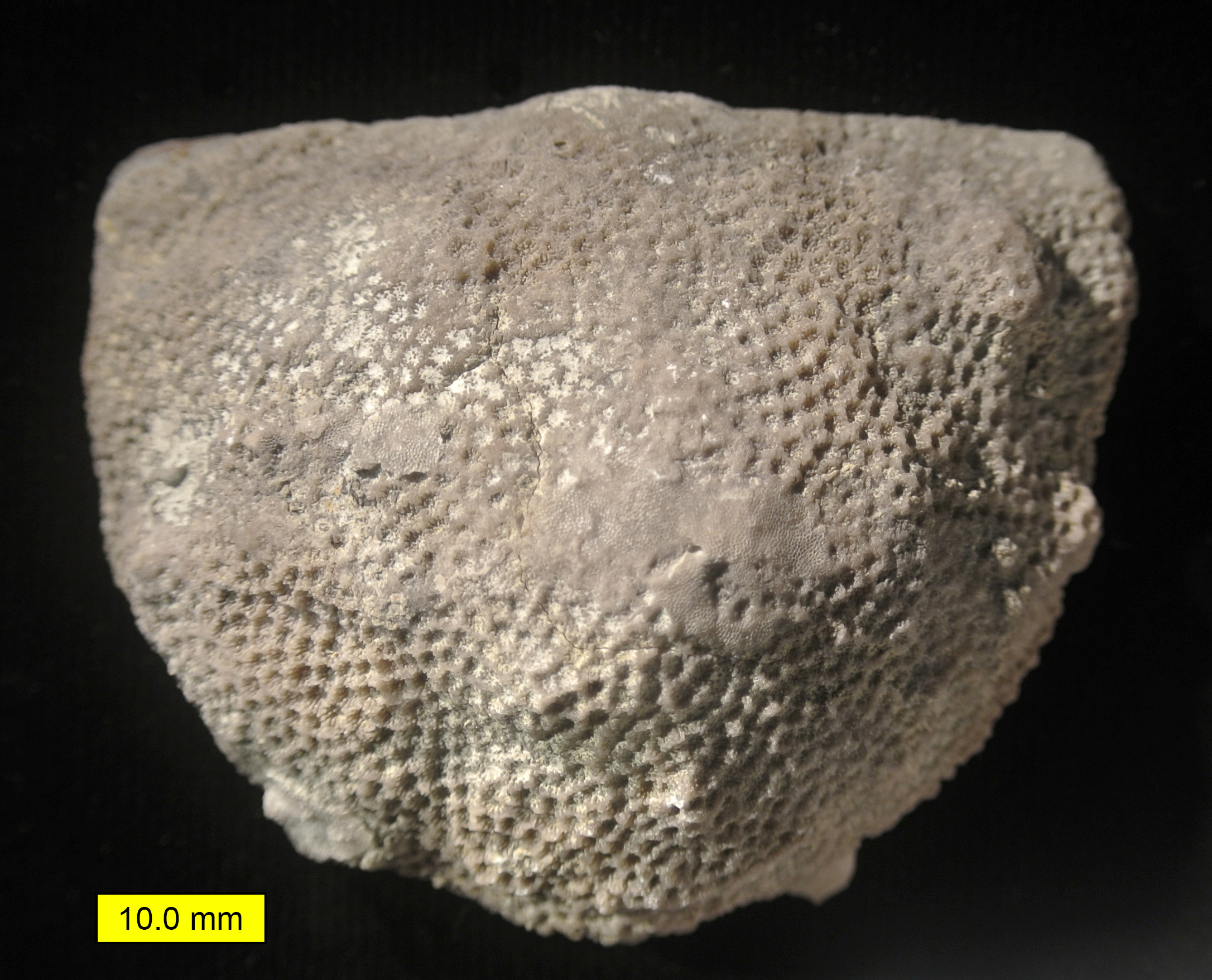
The coral Protaraea richmondensis on the brachiopod Rafinesquina ponderosa; Whitewater Formation, Indiana, Upper Ordovician.

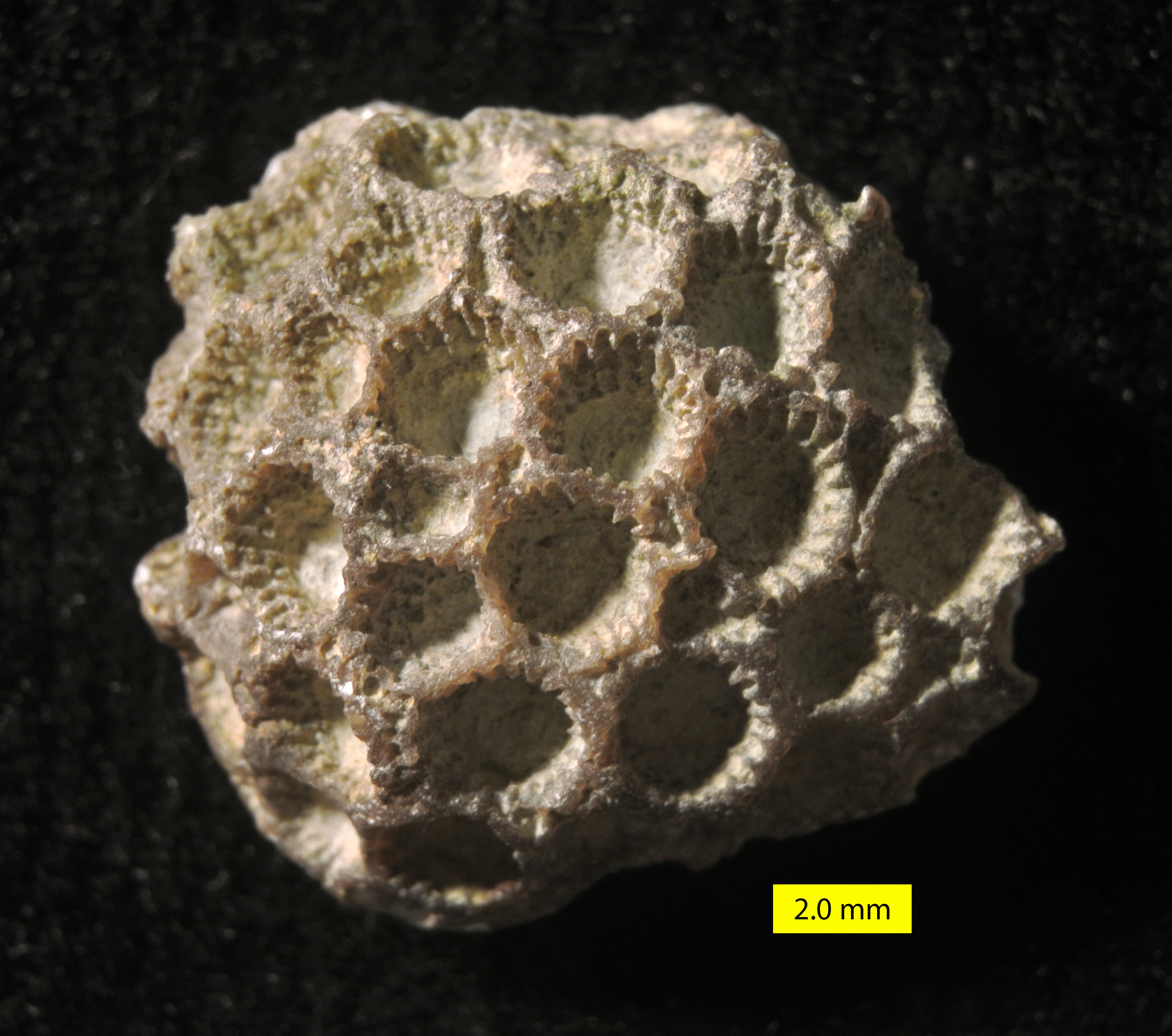
Tabulate coral Calapoecia huronensis Billings, 1865; Waynesville Formation, Upper Ordovician, Caesar Creek, Ohio.
