= List of the prehistoric life of Wisconsin =

This list of the prehistoric life of Wisconsin contains the various prehistoric life-forms whose fossilized remains have been reported from within the US state of Wisconsin.

== Precambrian ==
The Paleobiology Database records no known occurrences of Precambrian fossils in Wisconsin.

== Paleozoic ==
=== Selected Paleozoic taxa of Wisconsin ===
- †Acernaspis
- †Acidaspis
- †Actinoceras
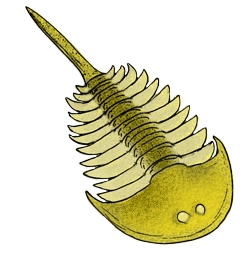
- Restoration of the Cambrian arthropod Aglaspis
  †Aglaspis
- †Agraulos
- †Amplexopora
- †Amplexus
- †Arctinurus
- †Athyris
- †Atrypa
  - †Atrypa reticularis – tentative report
- †Bumastus
  - †Bumastus armatus
  - †Bumastus cuniculus
  - †Bumastus dayi
  - †Bumastus ioxus
  - †Bumastus niagarensis
  - †Bumastus tenuis
- †Calymene
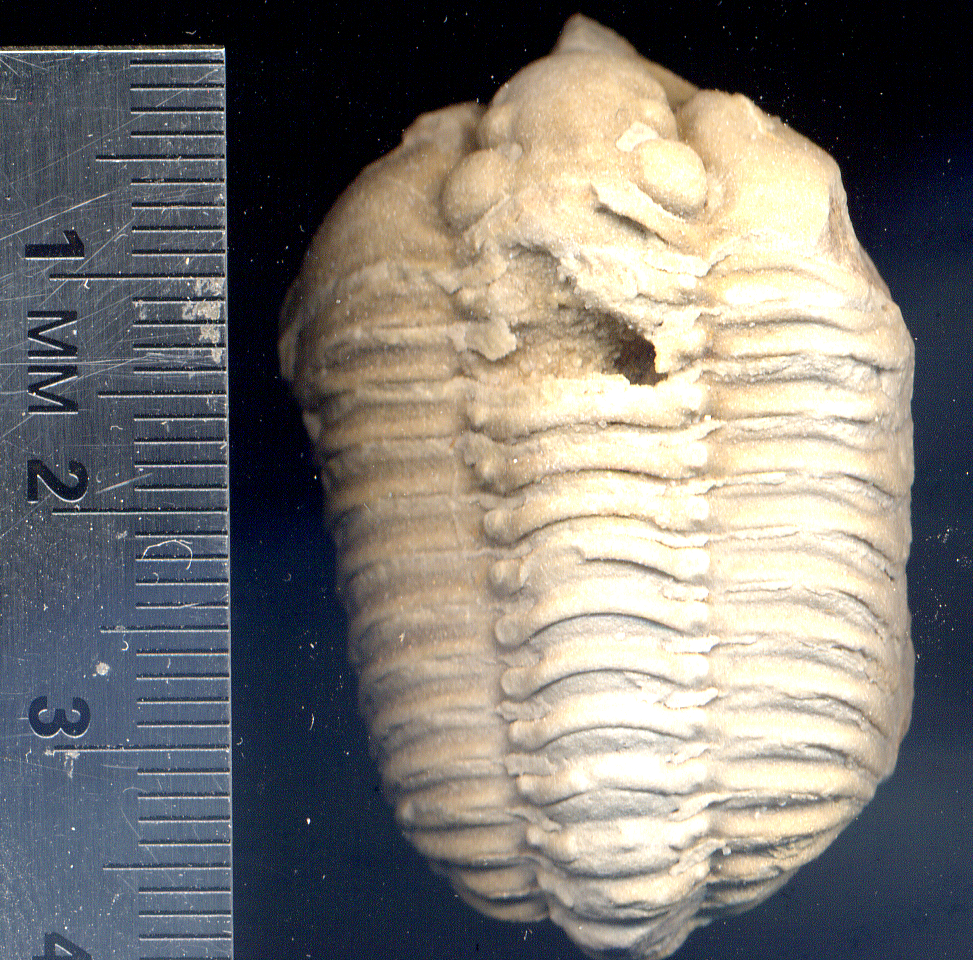
  - Fossil of the Silurian trilobite Calymene celebra
    †Calymene celebra
- †Catenipora
- †Cedaria
- †Ceratocephala
- †Ceraurus
- †Cheirurus
- †Chippewaella – type locality for genus
- †Chondrites
- †Chonetes
- †Conchidium
- †Conocoryphe
- †Coolinia
- †Coosia
- †Corbina
- †Cornulites
- †Crepicephalus
- †Crotalocrinites
- †Cyathocrinites – tentative report
- †Cycloceras
- †Cypricardinia
- †Dalmanites
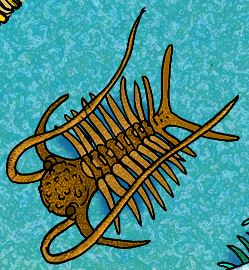
- Life restoration of two species of the Silurian trilobite Deiphon
  †Deiphon
- †Dendrograptus
- †Dicoelosia
- †Dikelocephalus
- †Dimerocrinites
  - †Dimerocrinites occidentalis
- †Distomodus
- †Distyrax
- †Dresbachia
- †Echinochiton – type locality for genus
  - †Echinochiton dufoei – type locality for species
- †Ellesmeroceras
- †Ellipsocephalus
- †Elrodoceras
- †Encrinurus
- †Entomaspis
- †Eophacops
  - †Eophacops handwerki
- †Eospirifer
  - †Eospirifer radiatus
- †Eucalyptocrinites
  - †Eucalyptocrinites crassus
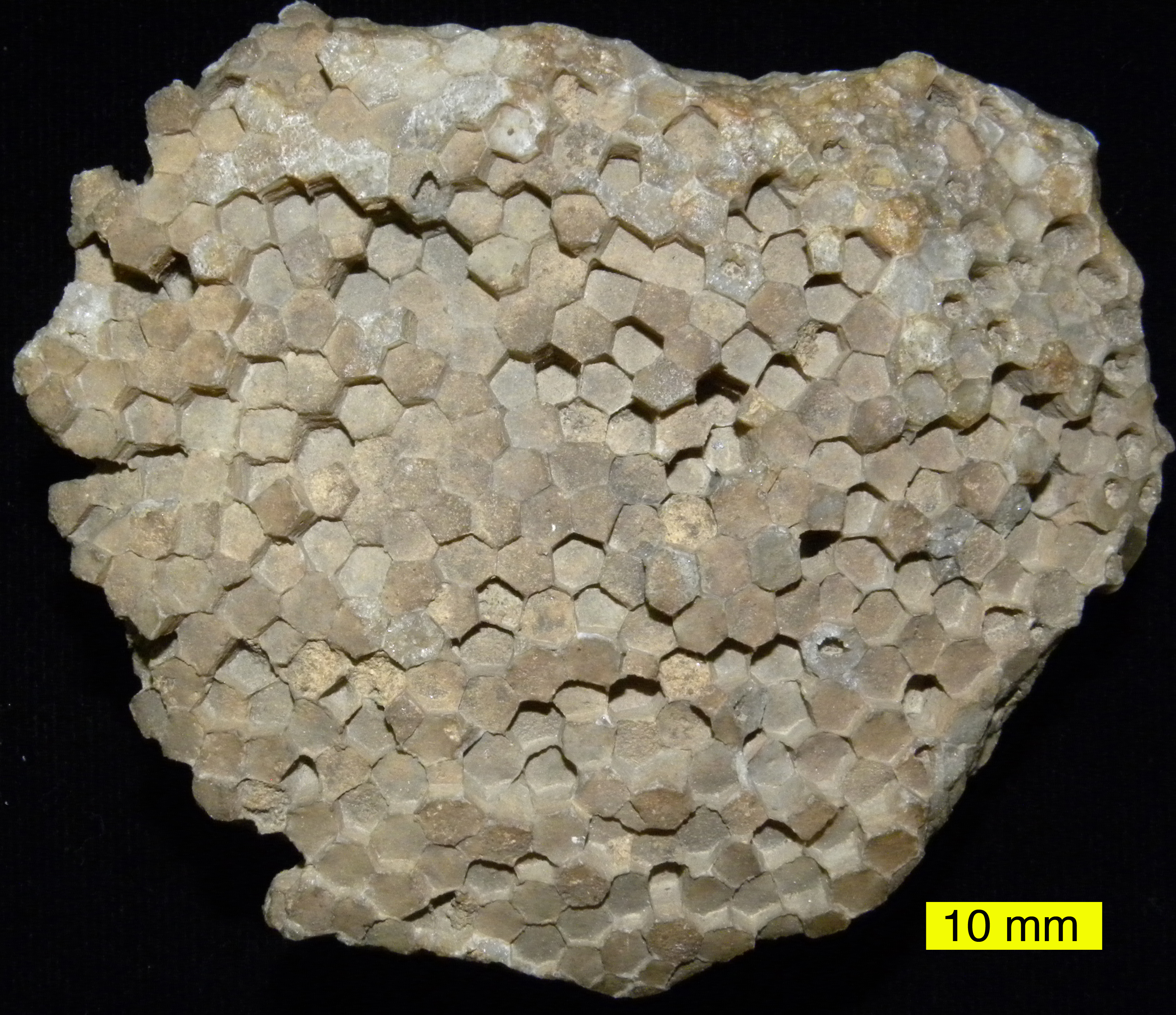
- Fossil of the Late Ordovician-Permian tabulate coral Favosites
  †Favosites
- †Geisonocerina
- †Hadromeros
- †Halysites
- †Harpidium
- †Hexameroceras
- †Holopea
- †Howella
- †Hyolithes
- †Hypseloconus
- †Illaenus
- †Inversoceras
- †Irvingella
- †Isotelus
- †Kionoceras
- †Krausella
- †Leonaspis
- †Leurocycloceras
- †Lingula
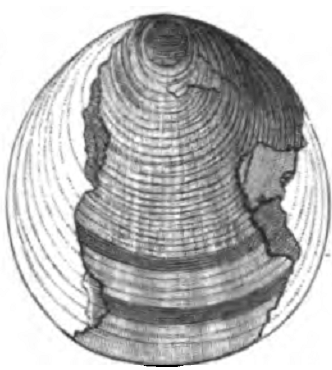
- Illustration of a fossilized shell of the Cambrian-Late Ordovician brachiopod Lingulella
  †Lingulella
- †Lonchocephalus
- †Mackenziurus
- †Marsupiocrinus
- †Maryvillia
- †Matthevia
- †Meristina
- †Michelinoceras
- †Milaculum
- †Monograptus
- †Murchisonia
- †Norwoodia
- †Obolus
- †Ophioceras
- †Ozarkodina
- †Pelagiella
- †Pemphigaspis
- †Pentamerus
- †Pentlandia
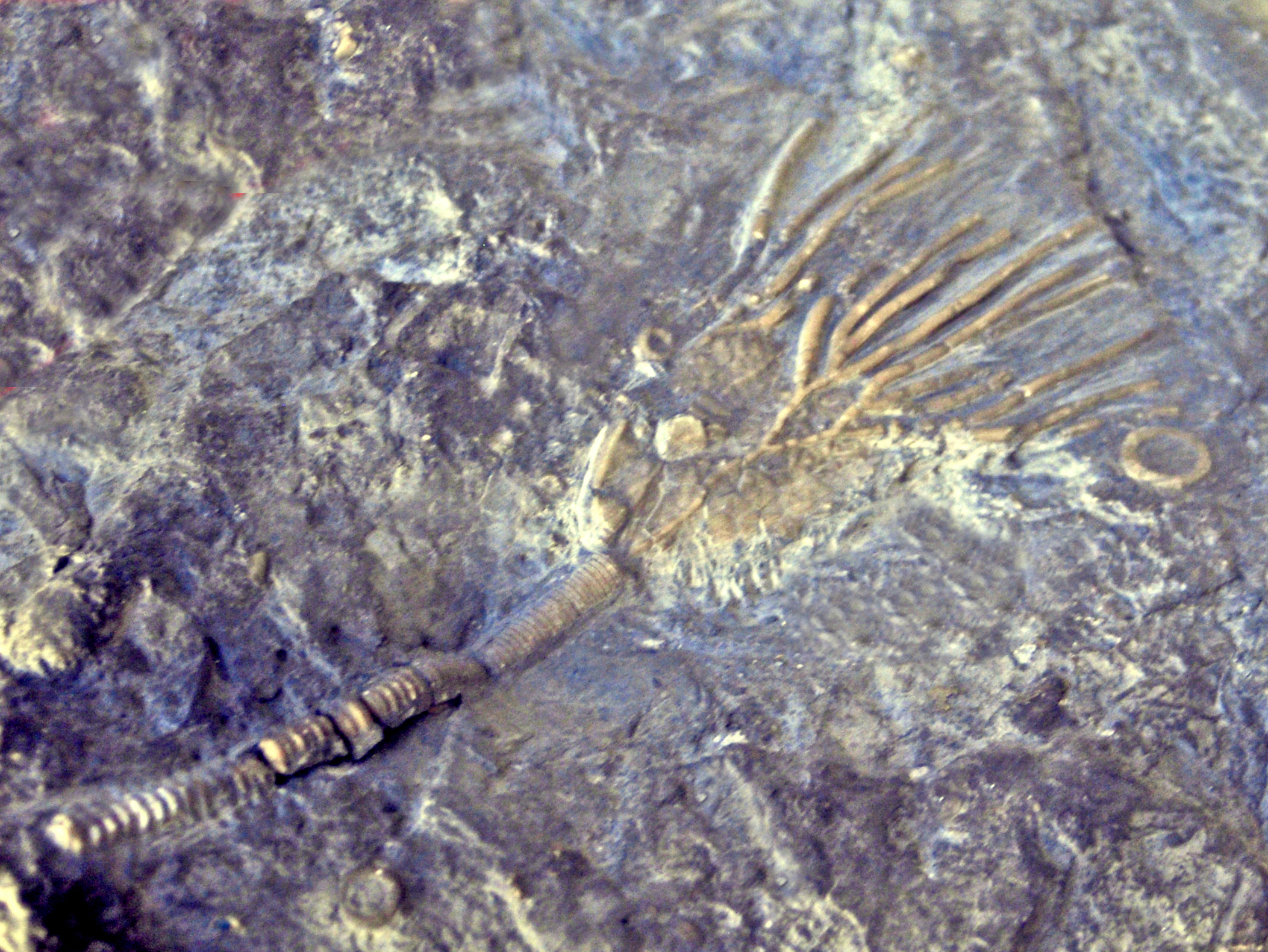
- Fossil of the Silurian-Carboniferous crinoid ("sea lily") Periechocrinus
  †Periechocrinus
- †Phragmolites
- †Plaesiomys
- †Plagiostomoceras
- †Planolites
- †Platyceras
- †Platystrophia
- †Plectodonta
- †Pleurodictyum
- Pleurotomaria
- †Polygrammoceras
- †Proetus
- †Sactorthoceras
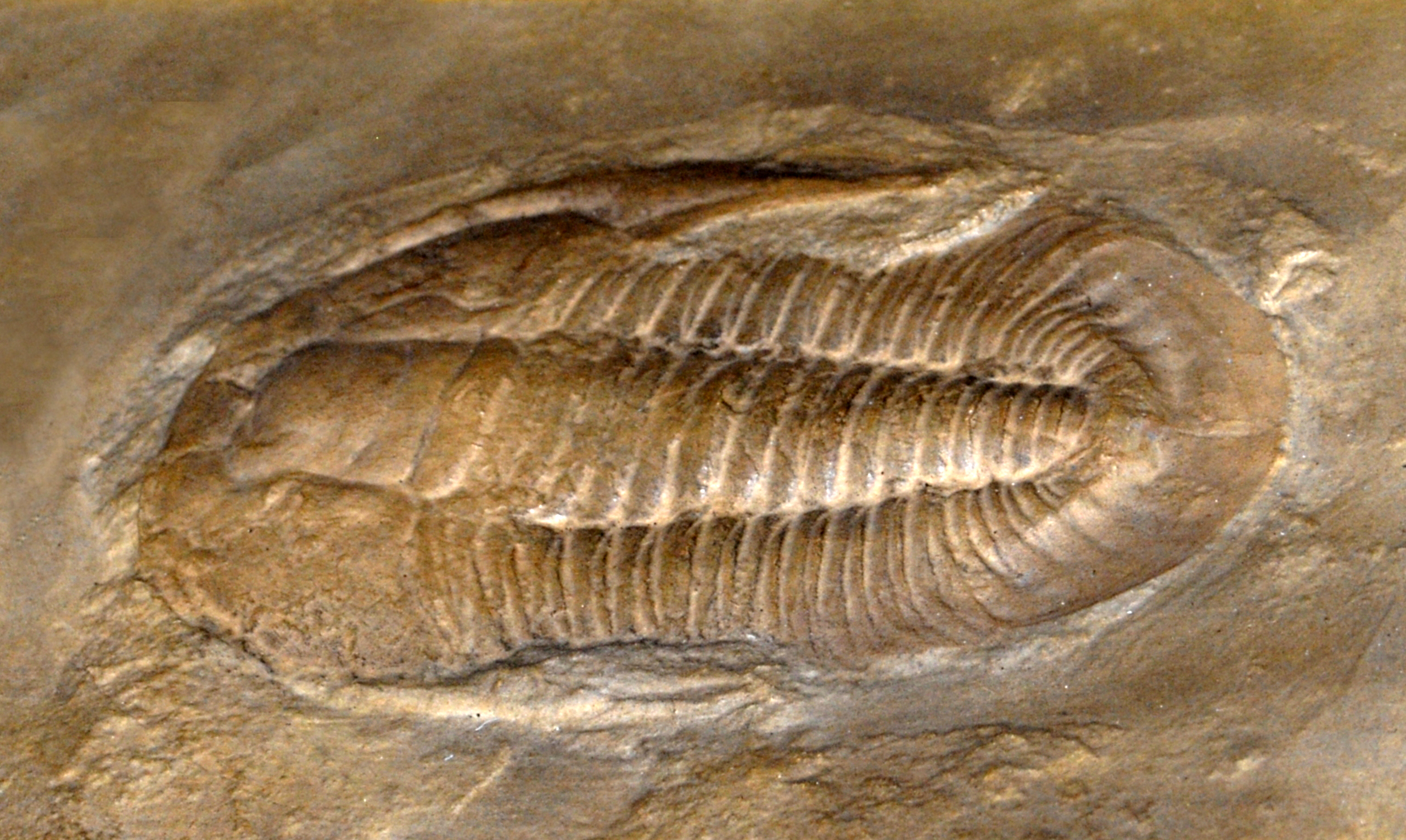
- Fossil of the Cambrian-Ordovician trilobite Saukiella
  †Saukiella
- †Scutellum
- †Similodonta
- †Skenidioides
- †Skolithos
- †Sowerbyella
- †Sphaerexochus
- †Strophomena
  - †Strophomena costata
  - †Strophomena plattinensis
- †Subulites
- †Thalassinoides
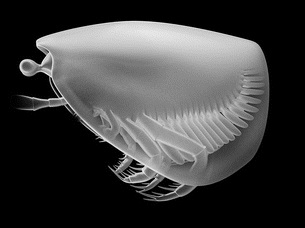
- Life restoration of the Silurian arthropod Thylacares
  †Thylacares – type locality for genus
  - †Thylacares brandonensis – type locality for species
- †Uranoceras
- †Westonia
- †Waukeshaaspis
- †Whitfieldia
- †Wurmiella
  - †Wurmiella excavata

== Mesozoic ==
The Paleobiology Database records no known occurrences of Mesozoic fossils in Wisconsin.

== Cenozoic ==
- Acidota
  - †Acidota quadrata
- Aegialia
  - †Aegialia lacustris
  - †Aegialia terminalis
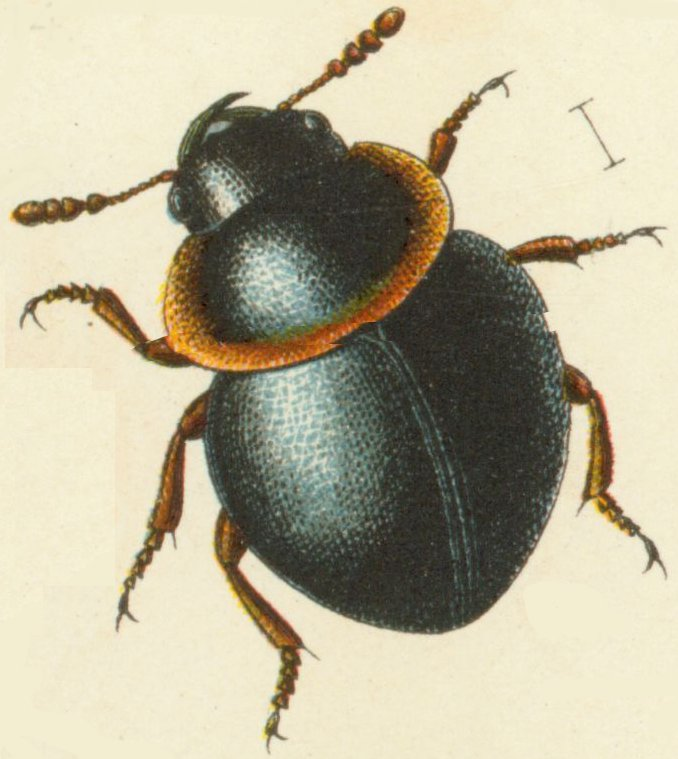
- Illustration of a living Agathidium round fungus beetle
  Agathidium
- Arpedium
- Asaphidion
  - †Asaphidion yukonense
- Bembidion
  - †Bembidion grapii
  - †Bembidion mutatum
- Bledius
- Byrrhus
- Calathus
  - †Calathus ingratus
- Carabus
  - †Carabus taedatus
- Cercyon
  - †Cercyon herceus
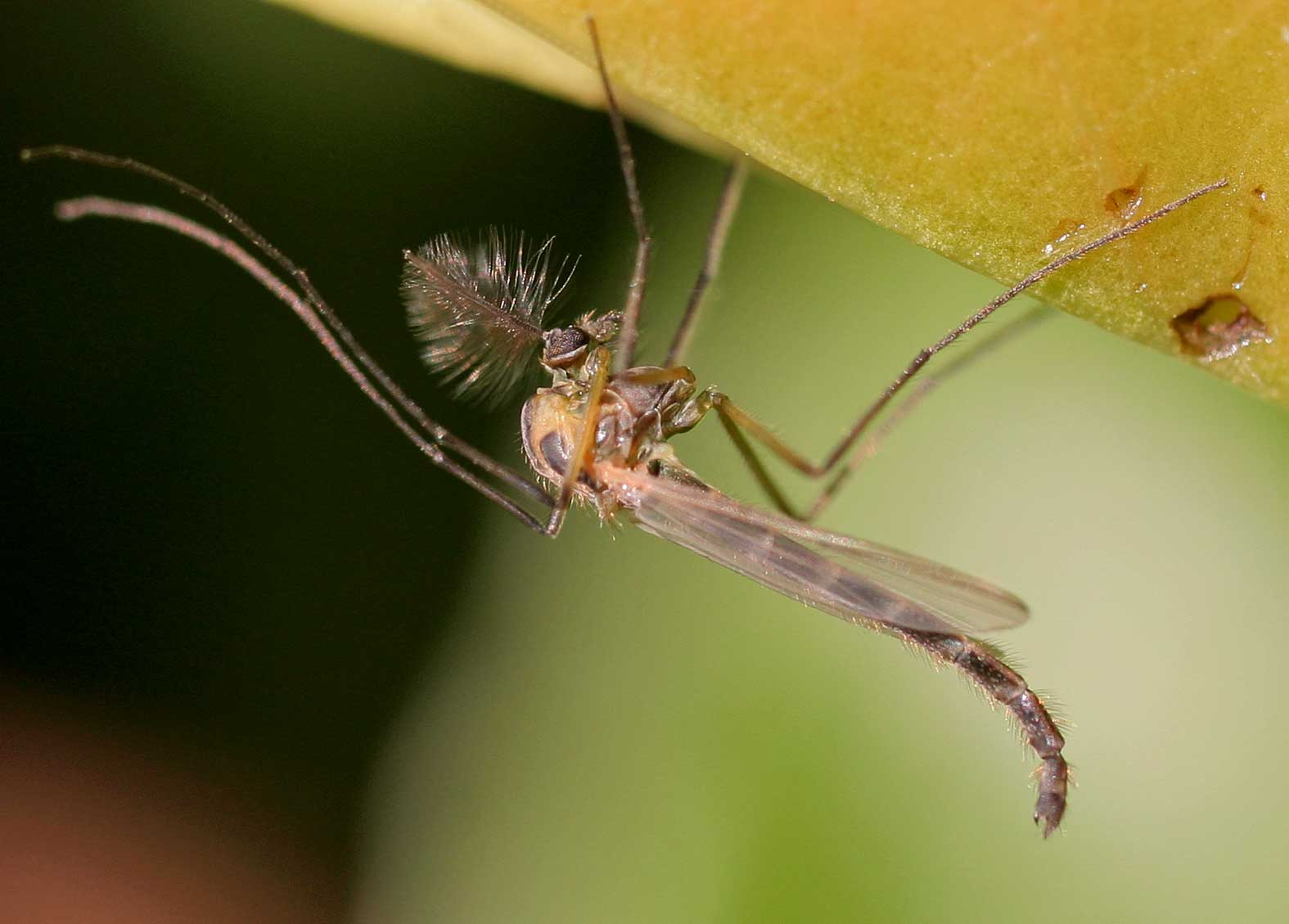
- A living Chironomus midge
  Chironomus – or unidentified comparable form
- Conophthorus
  - †Conophthorus coniperda – or unidentified comparable form
- Copromyza
- Cryptophagus
- Curimopsis
- Cytilus
- Dyschirius
- Eusphalerum – or unidentified comparable form
- Formica
- Helina – or unidentified comparable form
- †Mammuthus
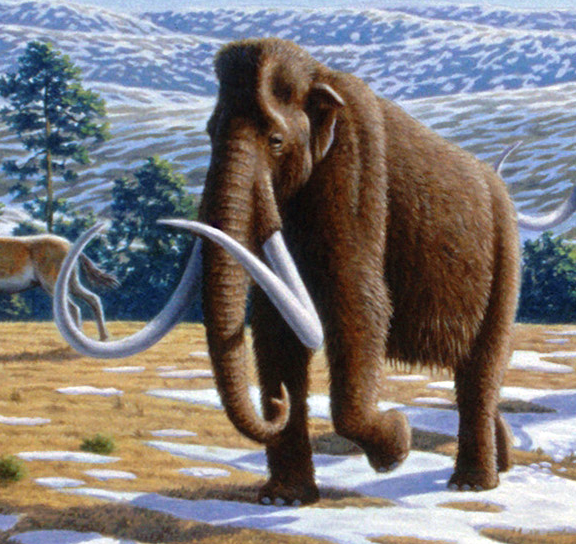
  - Restoration of a herd of Mammuthus primigenius, or wooly mammoths
    †Mammuthus primigenius
- Mecopeltus – or unidentified comparable form
- Myrmica
- Negastrius
- Notiophilus
  - †Notiophilus directus
- Ochthebius
- Olophrum
- Pediacus
  - †Pediacus fuscus
- Phloeosinus
  - †Phloeosinus pini
- Phloeotribus
  - †Phloeotribus piceae
- Pityophthorus
  - †Pityophthorus puberulus
- Polygraphus
  - †Polygraphus rufipennis
- Pterostichus – or unidentified comparable form
- Quedius
  - †Quedius uteanus
- Scolytus
  - †Scolytus piceae
- Simplocaria
  - †Simplocaria tessellata
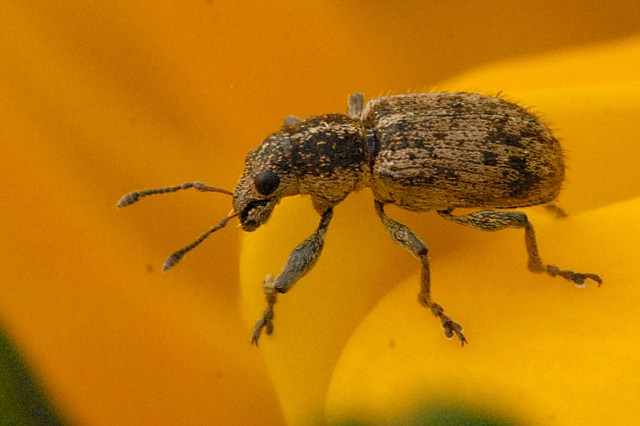
- A living Sitona weevil
  Sitona
- Stenus
- Trechus
  - †Trechus apicalis
