= List of the Paleozoic life of Wisconsin =

This list of the Paleozoic life of Wisconsin contains the various prehistoric life-forms whose fossilized remains have been reported from within the US state of Wisconsin and are between 538.8 and 252.17 million years of age.

== A ==
- †Acernaspis
- †Acheilops
- †Acheronauta- type locality of the genus
- †Acidaspis
- †Acrotreta
- †Actinoceras
- †Actinopteria
  - †Actinopteria brisa
- †Actinurus
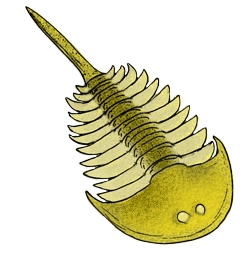
- Life restoration of the Cambrian arthropod Aglaspis
  †Aglaspis
- †Agraulos
  - †Agraulos woosteri
- †Alveolites
- †Amphicoelia
  - †Amphicoelia leidyi
- †Amphicyrtoceras
  - †Amphicyrtoceras laterale
  - †Amphicyrtoceras orcas
- †Amplexopora
  - †Amplexopora minnesotensis
- †Amplexus
  - †Amplexus fenestratus
- †Anastrophia
  - †Anastrophia internascens
- †Anatolepis – tentative report
  - †Anatolepis heintzi
- †Ancrinurus
  - †Ancrinurus nereus
- †Antirhynchonella
  - †Antirhynchonella ventricosa
- †Arcadiaspis – type locality for genus
  - †Arcadiaspis bispinata – type locality for species
- †Archinacella – type locality for genus
  - †Archinacella powersi – type locality for species
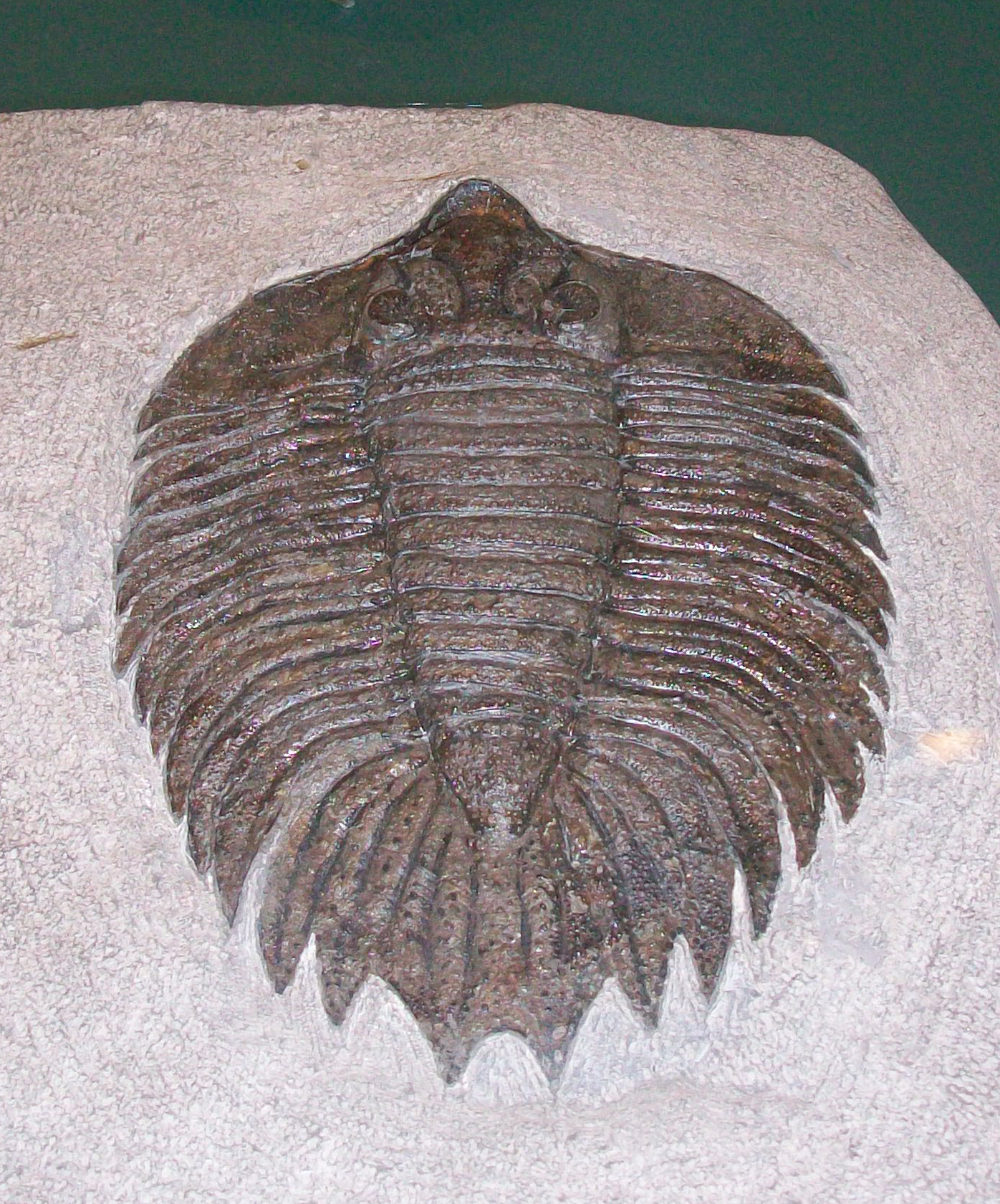
- Fossil of the Silurian trilobite Arctinurus
  †Arctinurus
- †Arctunurus
- †Arenosicaris
- †Arenosicaris- Type locality for the genus
- †Armonia
- †Ascoceras
  - †Ascoceras croneisi
- †Aspeluindia
  - †Aspeluindia fluegeli
- †Astraeospongium
- †Athyris
  - †Athyris vittara
- †Atrpina
  - †Atrpina magnaventra
- †Atrypa
  - †Atrypa pronis
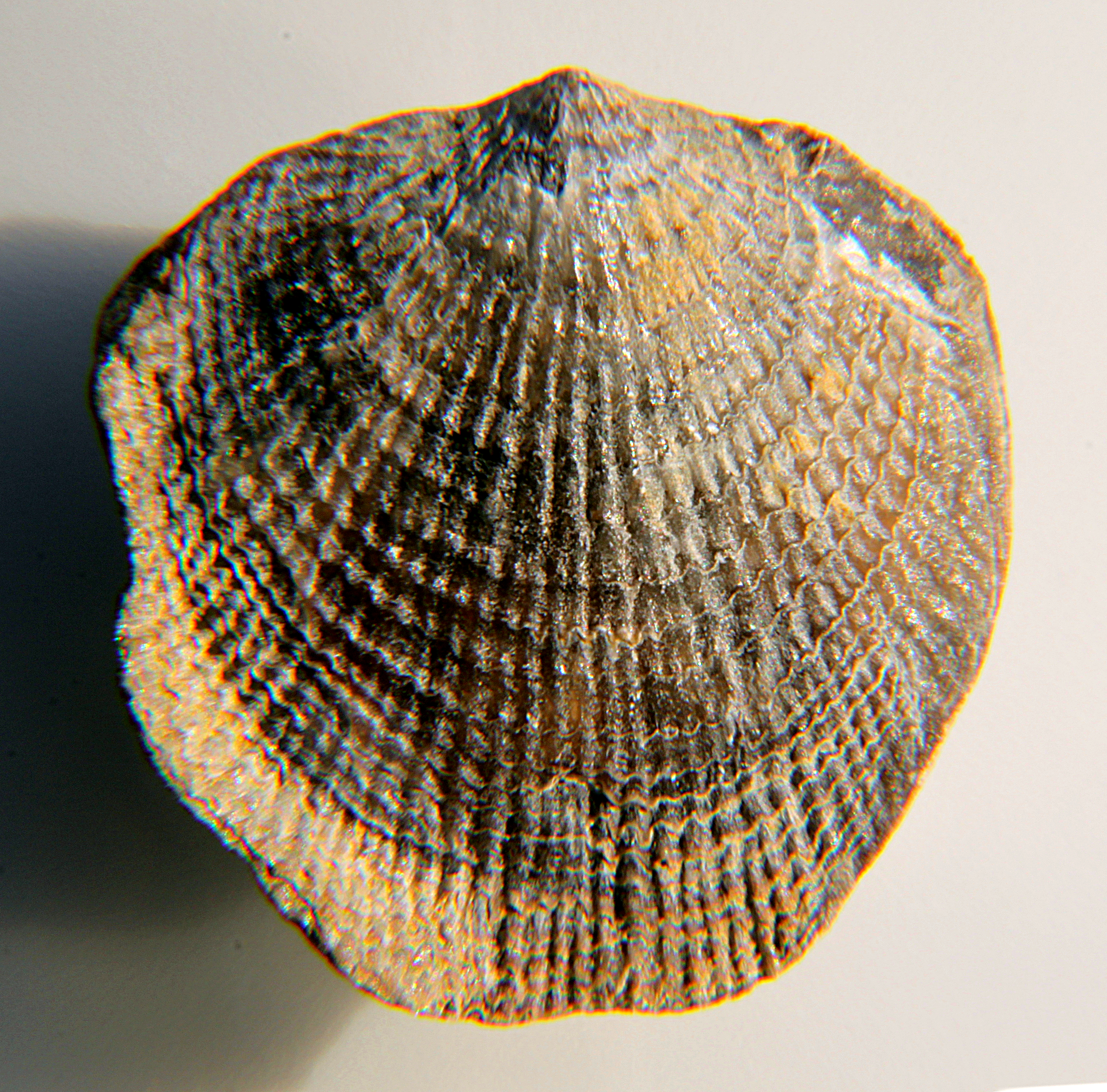
  - Fossilized shell of the Silurian-Late Devonian brachiopod Atrypa reticularis
    †Atrypa reticularis – tentative report
- †Atrypina
  - †Atrypina magnaventra

== B ==
- †Beloitoceras – or unidentified related form
- †Billingsella
- †Bucanella
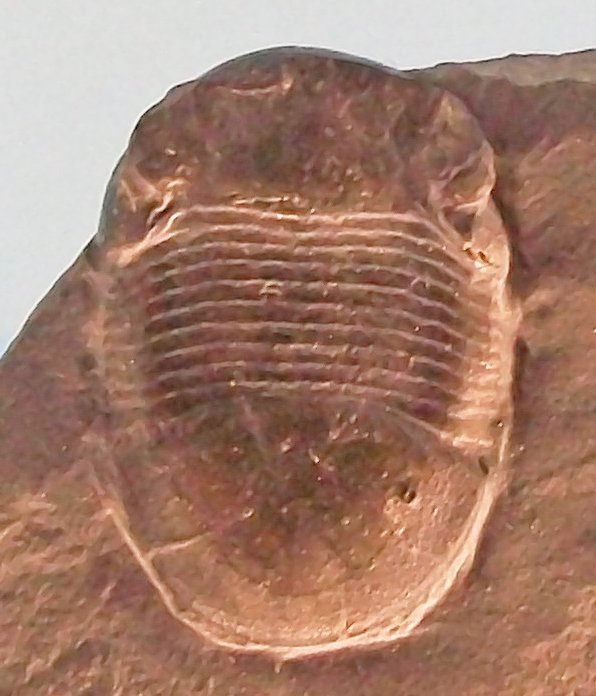
- Fossil of the Early Ordovician-Silurian trilobite Bumastus
  †Bumastus
  - †Bumastus armatus
  - †Bumastus cuniculus
  - †Bumastus dayi
  - †Bumastus ioxus
  - †Bumastus niagarensis
  - †Bumastus tenuis
- †Bumastoides
- †Burnetiella
- †(The butterfly animal)- type locality of the organism
- †Buthograptus
  - †Buthograptus gundersoni – type locality for species
  - †Buthograptus meyeri – type locality for species

== C ==
- †Calliocrinus
  - †Calliocrinus cornatus
  - †Calliocrinus cornutus
  - †Calliocrinus longispinus – or unidentified comparable form
- †Calvinella
  - †Calvinella wisconsinensis – or unidentified comparable form
- †Calymene
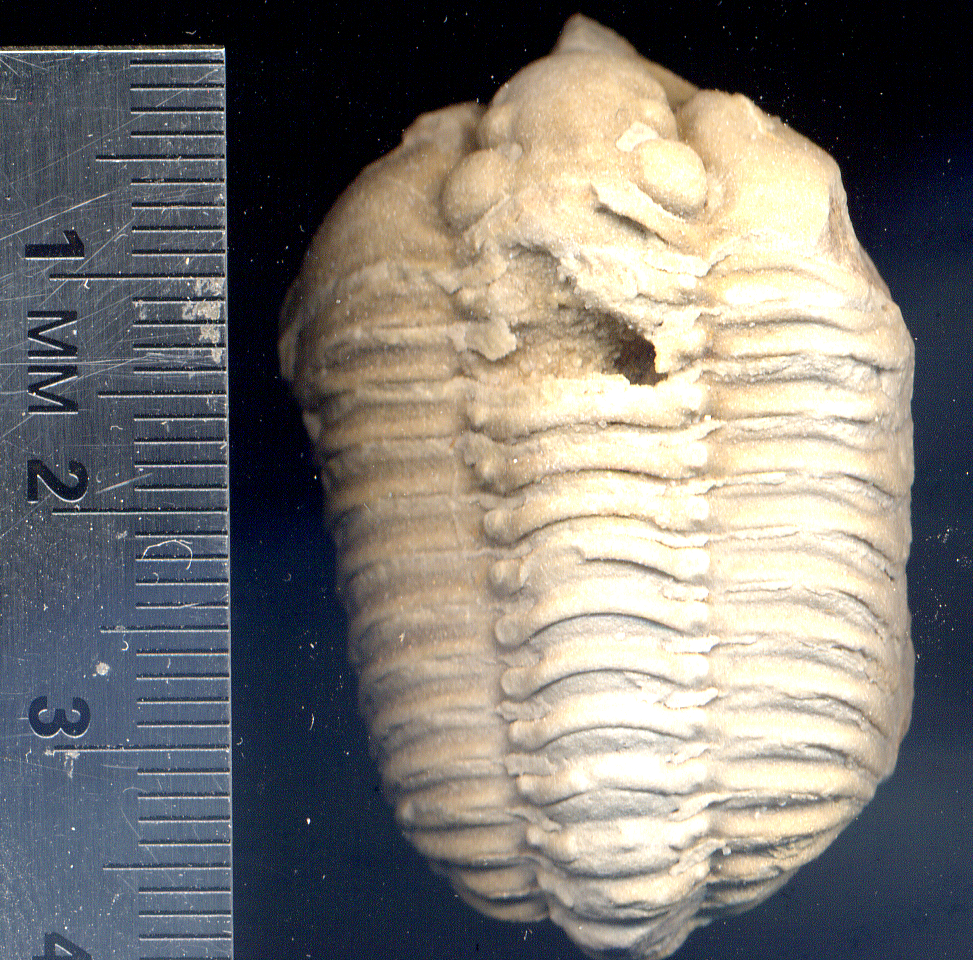
  - Fossil of the Silurian trilobite Calymene celebra
    †Calymene celebra
- †Camaraspis
- †Camerella
- †Campylorthis
  - †Campylorthis deflecta
- †Capelliniella
  - †Capelliniella mira
- †Caryocrinites
  - †Caryocrinites ornatus – or unidentified comparable form
- †Catenipora
- †Cedaria
- †Ceratocephala
  - †Ceratocephala goniata
- †Cerauromerus
  - †Cerauromerus hydei
- †Ceraurus
  - †Ceraurus hydei
  - †Ceraurus plattinensis
- †Ceratiocaris
- †Cheirurus
  - †Cheirurus niagarensis
- †Chippewaella – type locality for genus
  - †Chippewaella patellitheca – type locality for species
- †Climactichnites
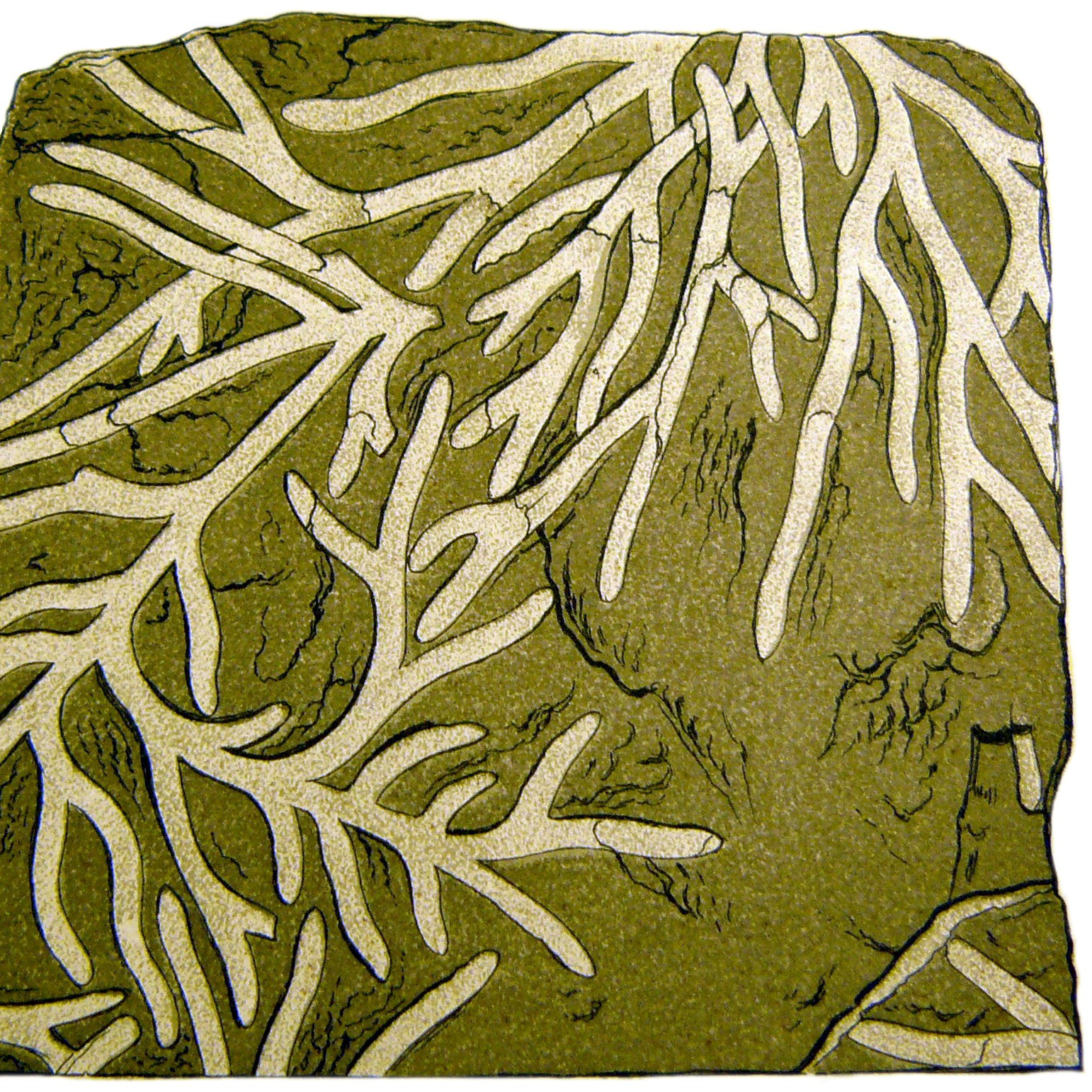
  Illustration of a fossil of the Cambrian-modern burrow ichnogenus Chondrites
- †Chondrites
- †Chonetes
  - †Chonetes schucherti
- †Clathrospira
  - †Clathrospira subconica
- †Conaspis
- †Conchidium
  - †Conchidium multicostatum
- †Conocoryphe
- †Conotoma
  - †Conotoma bispiralis
- †Conularia
- †Coolinia
  - †Coolinia applanata
  - †Coolinia subplana
- †Coosia
- †Corbina
- †Corbinia
  - †Corbinia burkhalteri – type locality for species
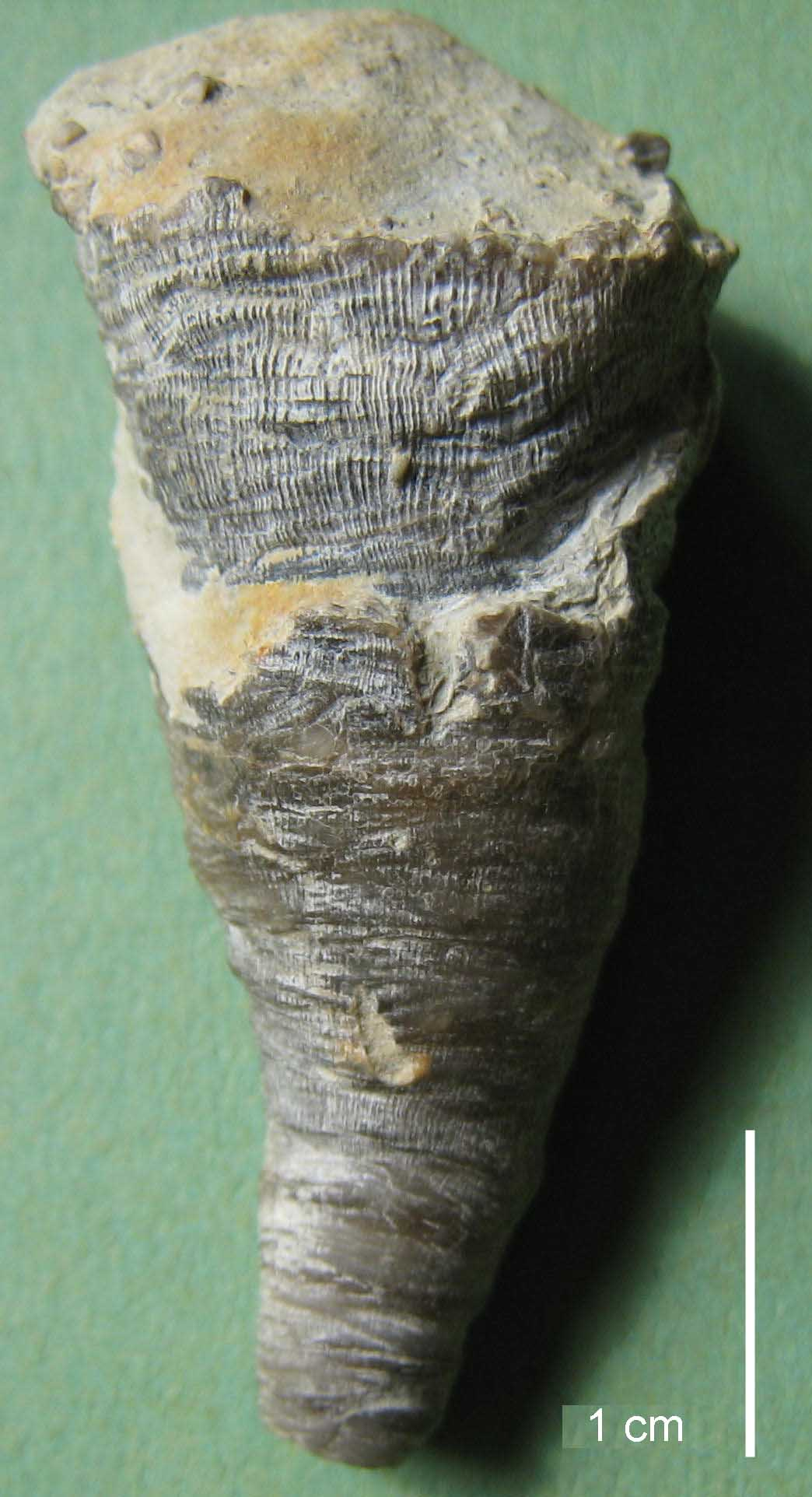
- Fossil of the Middle Ordovician-Carboniferous horn coral Cornulites
  †Cornulites
- †Corynotrypa
  - †Corynotrypa abrupta
- †Cranaena
  - †Cranaena subovata
  - †Cranaena thomasi
- †Crateroceras
  - †Crateroceras raymondi
- †Crepicephalus
- †Crotalocrinites
  - †Crotalocrinites cora
- †Ctenodonta
  - †Ctenodonta nasuta
- †Cupulocrinus
  - †Cupulocrinus levorsoni
- †Cyathaxonia
  - †Cyathaxonia wisconsinensis
- †Cyathocrinites – tentative report
  - †Cyathocrinites vanhornei
- †Cycloceras
  - †Cycloceras niagarense
- †Cypricardinia
  - †Cypricardinia arata
- †Cyrtia
  - †Cyrtia meta
- †Cyrtina
  - †Cyrtina triqueira
  - †Cyrtina umbonata
- †Cyrtocerina
  - †Cyrtocerina crenulata – type locality for species
- †Cyrtodonta
  - †Cyrtodonta huronensis
- †Cyrtorizoceras
  - †Cyrtorizoceras dardanus
  - †Cyrtorizoceras fosteri
  - †Cyrtorizoceras lucillum
  - †Cyrtorizoceras unguicurvatum
- †Cyrtospira
  - †Cyrtospira ventricosus
- †Cystiphyllum
  - †Cystiphyllum niagarense

== D ==
- †Dalejina
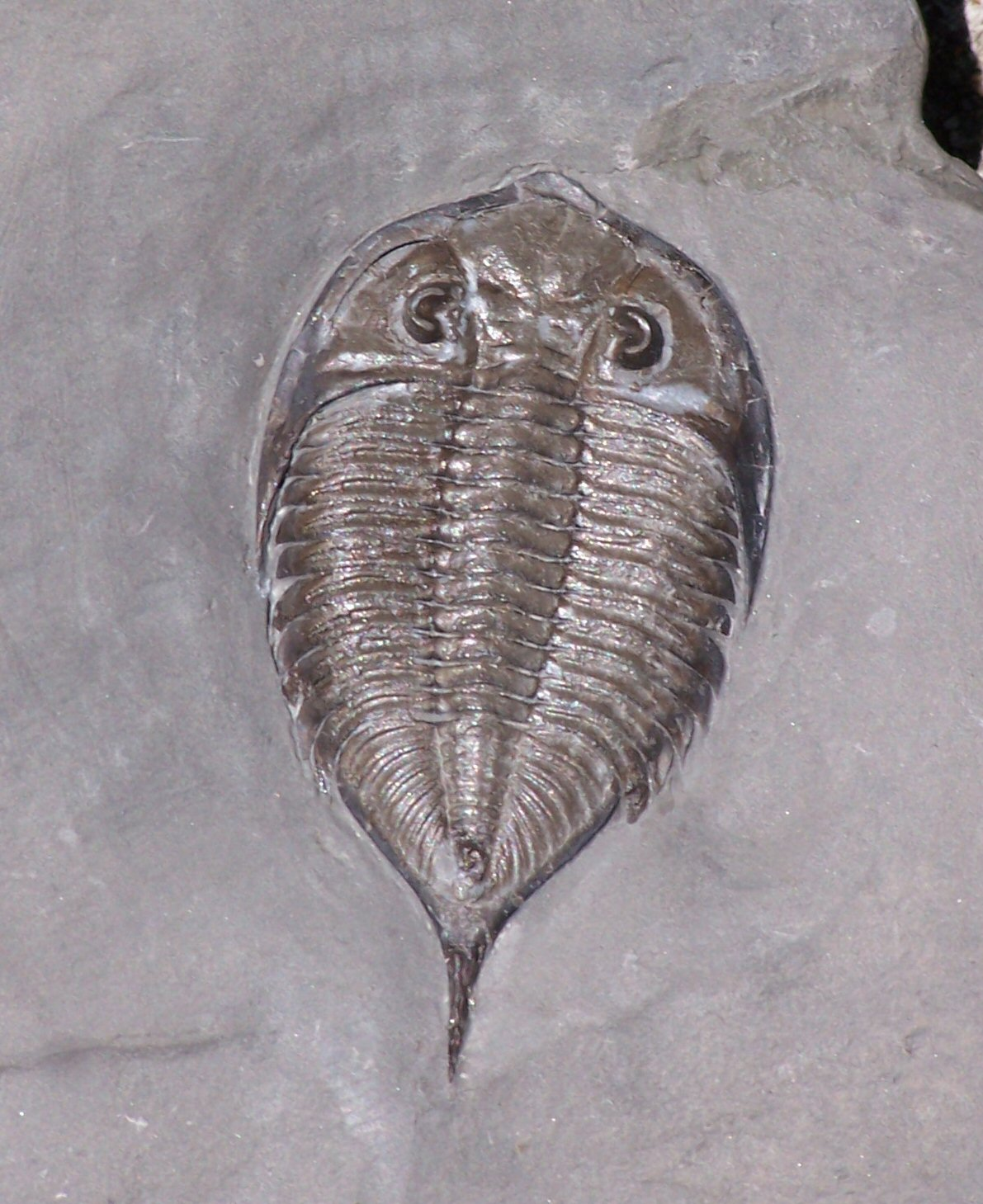
- Fossil of the Late Ordovician-Middle Devonian trilobite Dalmanites
  †Dalmanites
  - †Dalmanites illinoiensis
  - †Dalmanites illinoisensis
  - †Dalmanites platycaudatus
- †Dawsonoceras
  - †Dawsonoceras nodocostatum
- †Decoriconus
  - †Decoriconus fragilis
- †Decoroproetus
- †Deiphon
  - †Deiphon americanus
- †Dendrograptus
- †Desquamatia
- †Dicellomus
- †Dicoelosia
  - †Dicoelosia biloba
- †Dicranopeltis
  - †Dicranopeltis decipiens
  - †Dicranopeltis greeni
  - †Dicranopeltis nasuta
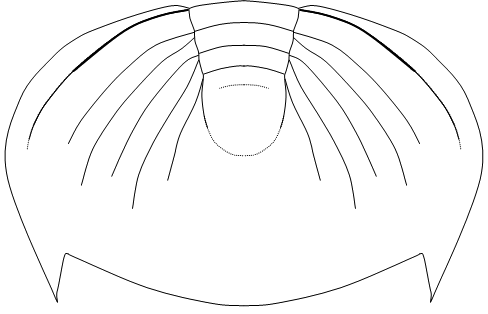
- Illustration of the fossilized pygidium (tail segment) of the Cambrian trilobite Dikelocephalus
  †Dikelocephalus
  - †Dikelocephalus minnesotensis
- †Dimerocrinited
  - †Dimerocrinited pentangularis
- †Dimerocrinites
  - †Dimerocrinites occidentalis
  - †Dimerocrinites pentangularis
- †Dinobolus
  - †Dinobolus conradi
- †Dinorthis
- †Diplotrypa
- †Distomodus
  - †Distomodus stenolophata
- †Distyrax
- †Dolerorthis
- †Dresbachia
- †Dudleyaspis

== E ==
- †Echinochiton – type locality for genus
  - †Echinochiton dufoei – type locality for species
- †Elita
  - †Elita subundifera
- †Ellesmeroceras
  - †Ellesmeroceras hotchkissi
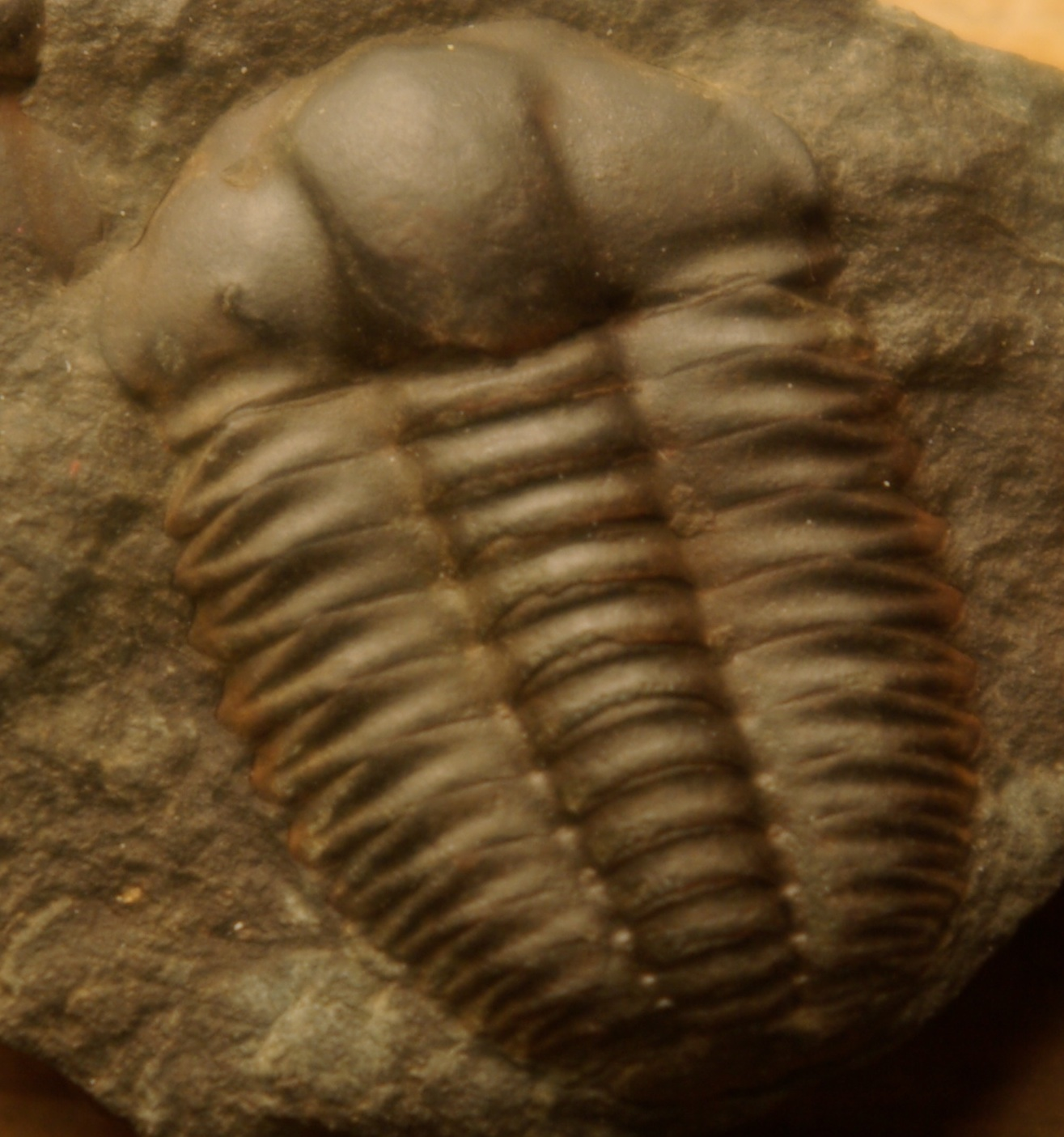
- Fossil of the Cambrian trilobite Ellipsocephalus
  †Ellipsocephalus
- †Ellsworthoconus
  - †Ellsworthoconus barabuensis
- †Elrodoceras
  - †Elrodoceras abnorme
- †Elvinia
- †Encrinurus
  - †Encrinurus egani
  - †Encrinurus nereus
  - †Encrinurus reflexus
- †Entomaspis
- †Eodictyonella (formerly Dictyonella)
  - †Eodictyonella reticulata
- †Eoleperditia
  - †Eoleperditia fabulites
- †Eophacops
  - †Eophacops handwerki
- †Eoplectodonta
- †Eospirifer
  - †Eospirifer radiatus
- †Eosyringothyris
  - †Eosyringothyris occidentalis
- †Eridotrypa
- †Escharopora
- †Eucalyptocrinites
  - †Eucalyptocrinites crassus
  - †Eucalyptocrinites depressus
  - †Eucalyptocrinites nodolosus
  - †Eucalyptocrinites nodulosus
  - †Eucalyptocrinites ornatus
- †Eunema
  - †Eunema fatua
- †Euomphalopterus
  - †Euomphalopterus alatus
- †Eurekia
  - †Eurekia eos – or unidentified comparable form
- †Eurychilina
  - †Eurychilina subradiata

== F ==
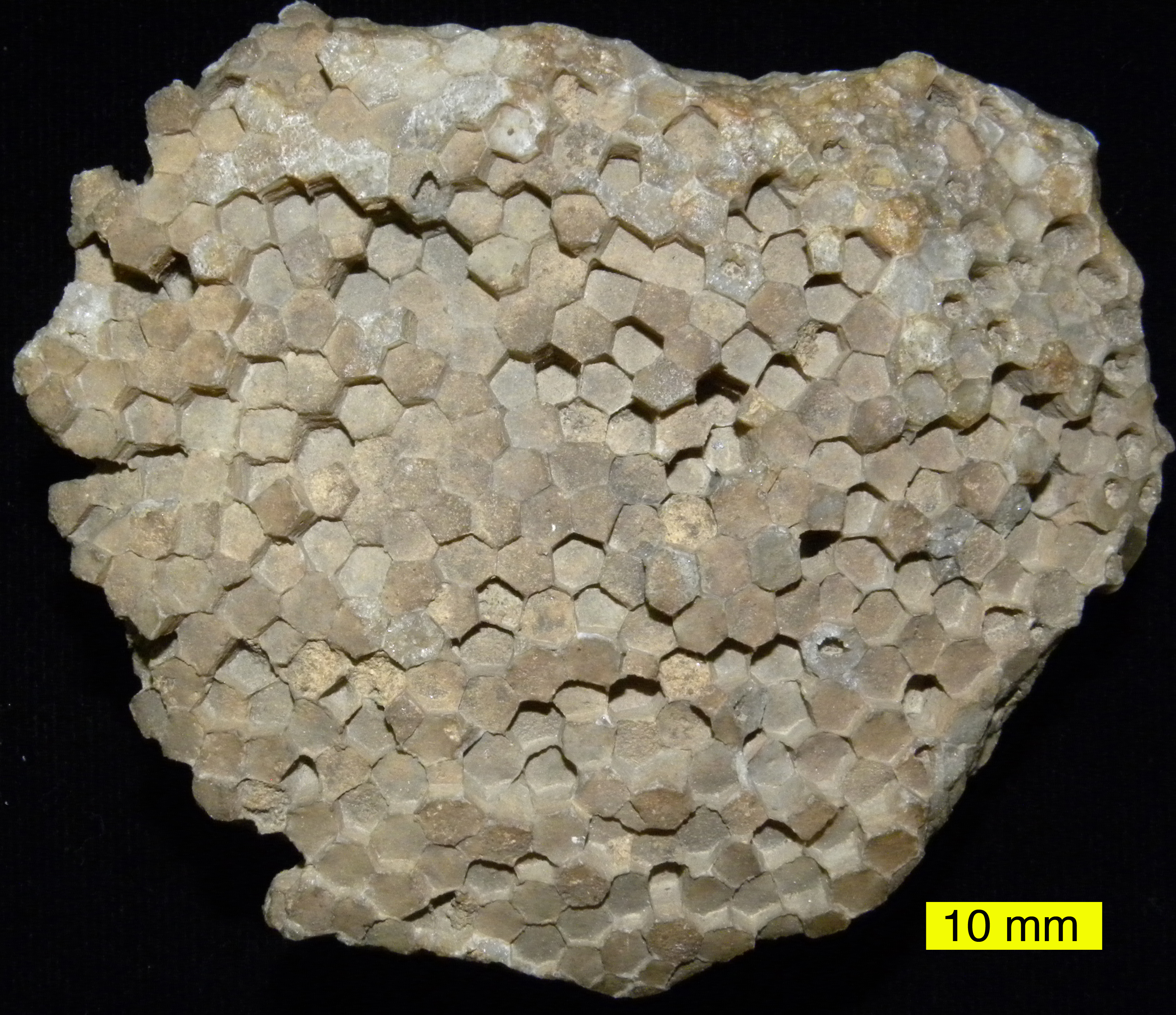
- Fossil of the Late Ordovician-Permian tabulate coral Favosites
  †Favosites
- †Foerstephyllum
- †Fusispira
  - †Fusispira schucherti – type locality for species
  - †Fusispira ventricosa

== G ==
- †Gabriceraurus
- †Geisonocerina
  - †Geisonocerina wauwatosense
- †Glomospirella
  - †Glomospirella exserta
- †Gomophocystites
  - †Gomophocystites glans
- †Gomphocystites
  - †Gomphocystites glans
- †Goniophora
  - †Goniophora quadrilatera
- †Gyronema
  - †Gyronema pulchellum – type locality for species
  - †Gyronema semicarinatum

== H ==
- †Hadromeros
  - †Hadromeros welleri
- †Hallicystis
  - †Hallicystis imago
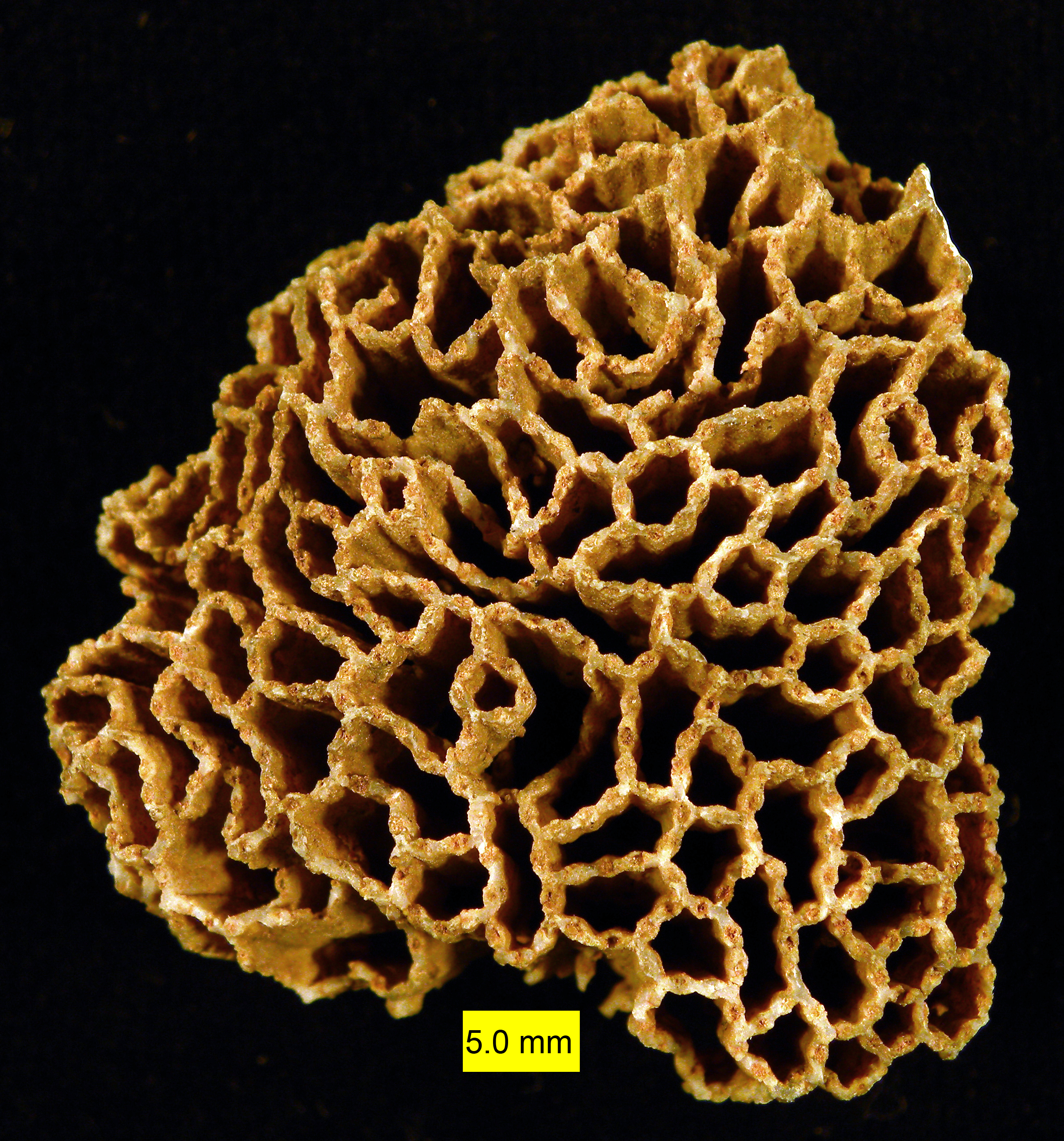
- Fossil of the Ordovician-Silurian tabulate coral Halysites
  †Halysites
- †Harpidella
- †Harpidium
  - †Harpidium racinensis
- †Harrisoceras
  - †Harrisoceras orthoceroides
- †Hedeina
- †Helicotoma
  - †Helicotoma planulata
  - †Helicotoma umbilicata
- †Heliolites
- †Hesperorthis
  - †Hesperorthis concava
  - †Hesperorthis tricenaria
- †Heterocladus- Type locality for the genus
- †Hexameroceras
  - †Hexameroceras septoris
- †Hineacrinus
  - †Hineacrinus angusta – or unidentified comparable form
- †Holocystites
  - †Holocystites abnormis
  - †Holocystites alternatus
  - †Holocystites cylindricus
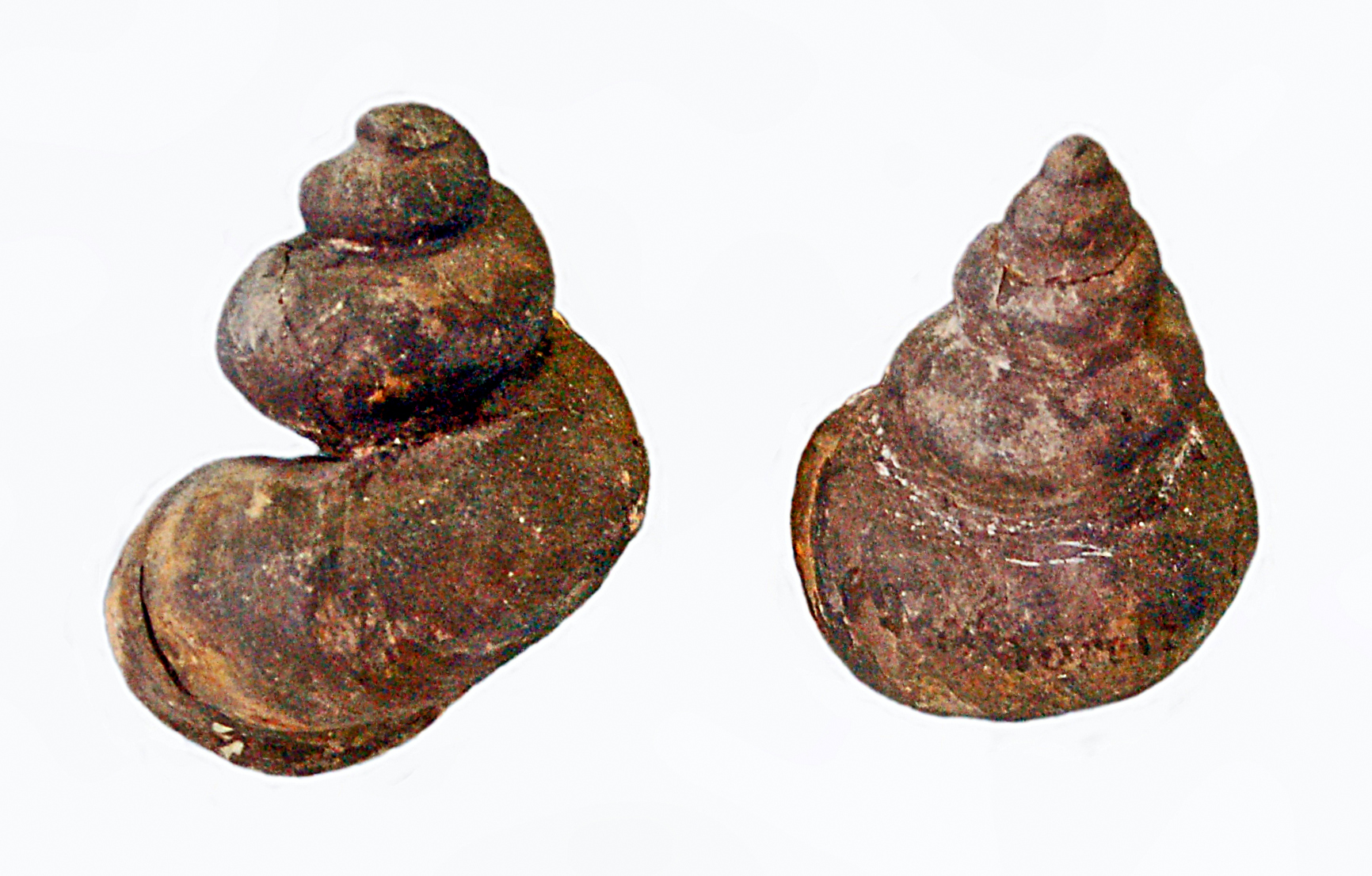
- Fossilized shells of the Ordovician-Carboniferous sea snail Holopea
  †Holopea
  - †Holopea ampla
  - †Holopea guelphensis
- †Hormotoma
  - †Hormotoma gracilis
- †Housia
- †Howella
- †Howellella
- †Huenella
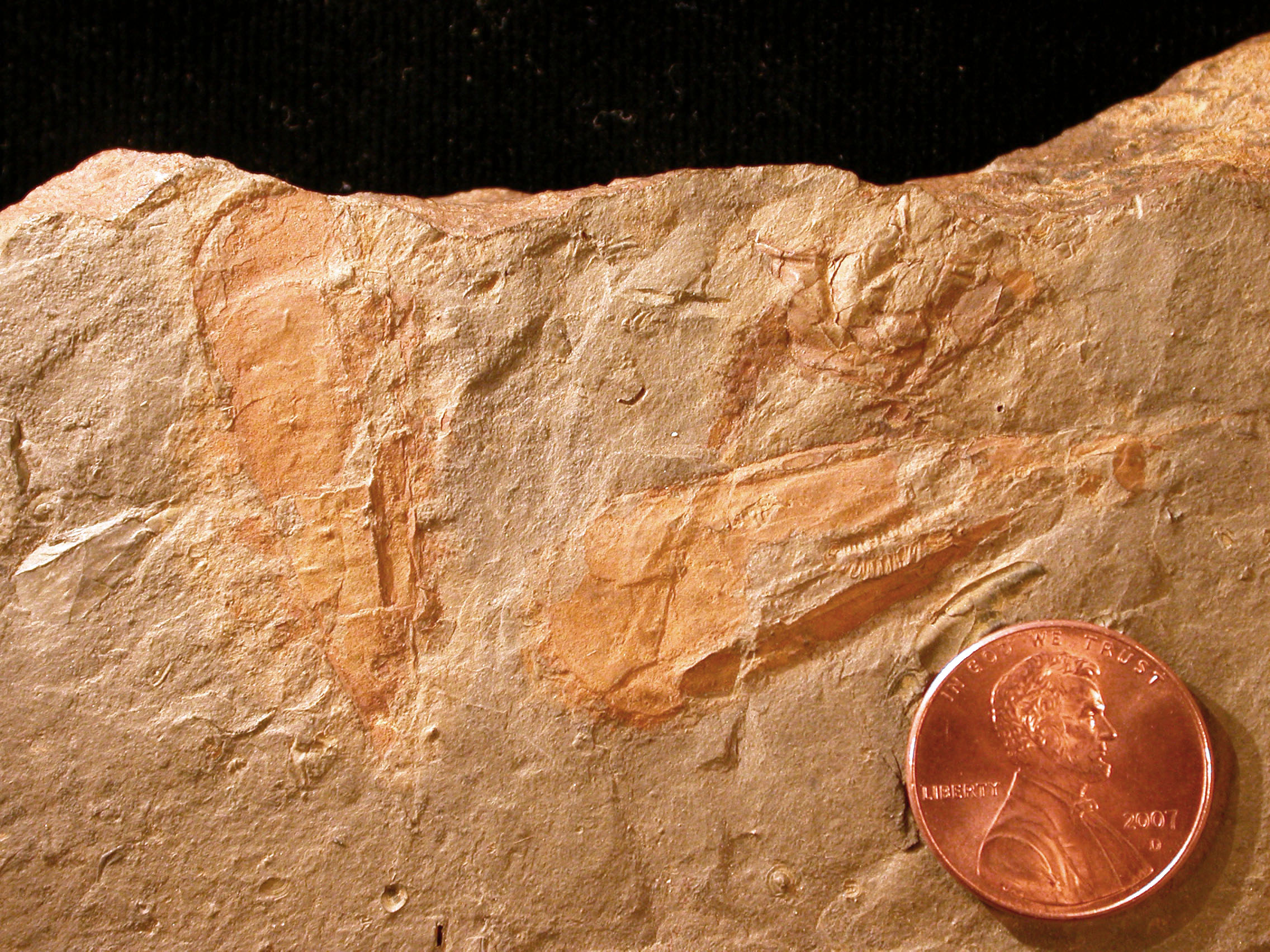
- Fossilized shells of the Cambrian-Permian brachiopod relative Hyolitha
  †Hyolithes
- †Hypseloconus
- †Hypsiptycha

== I ==
- †Ichyocrinus
  - †Ichyocrinus subangularis
- †Idahoia
- †Illaenoides
  - †Illaenoides triloba
- †Illaenurus
- †Illaenus
- †Inversoceras
  - †Inversoceras dayi
- †Irvingella
- †Ischadites
  - †Ischadites tenuis
- †Isorthis
  - †Isorthis clivosa
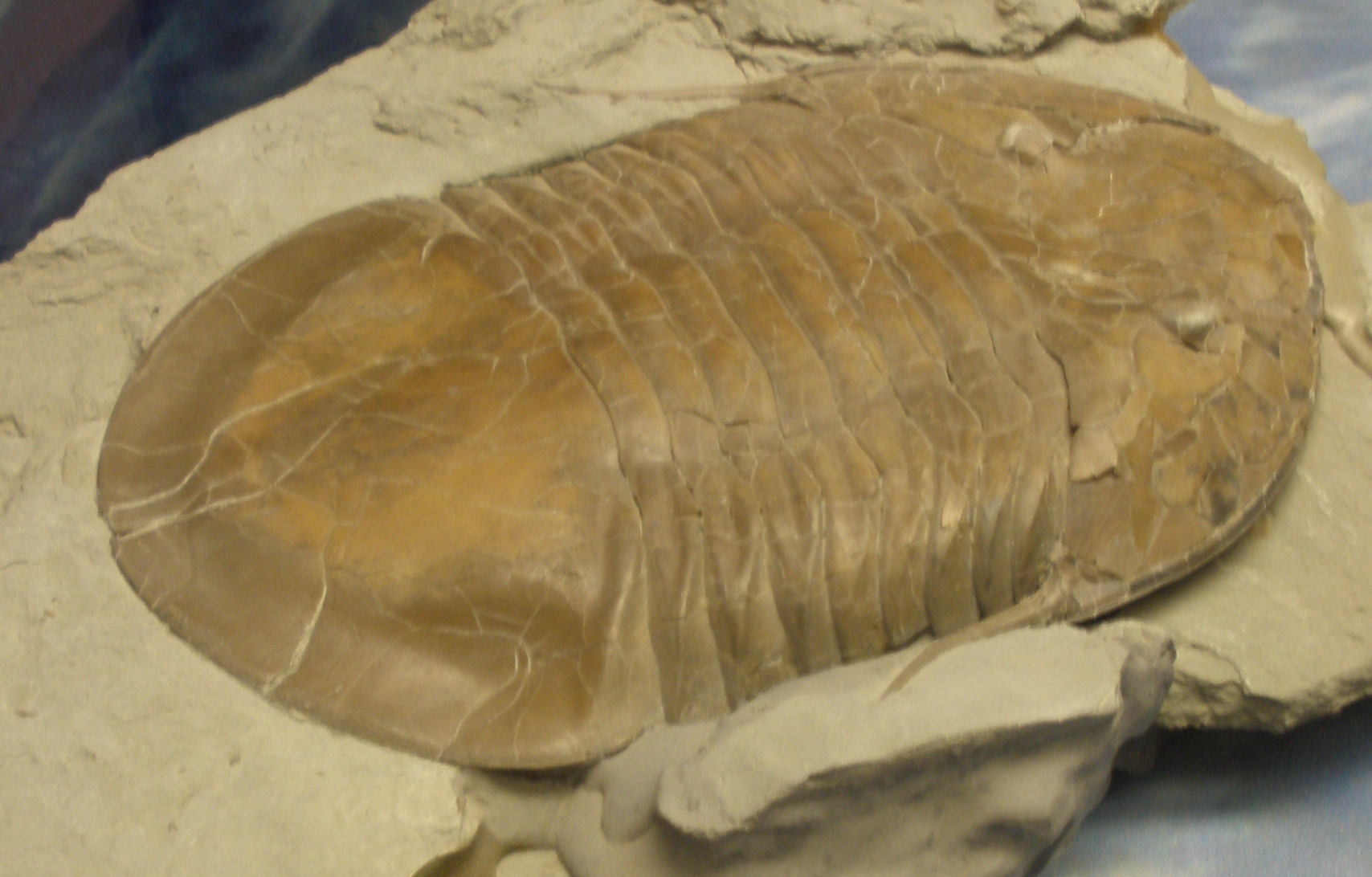
- Fossil of the Middle-Late Ordovician giant trilobite Isotelus.
  †Isotelus
  - †Isotelus simplex

== J ==
- †Janius
  - †Janius nobilis
- †Januns
  - †Januns nobilis
- †Jonesea

== K ==
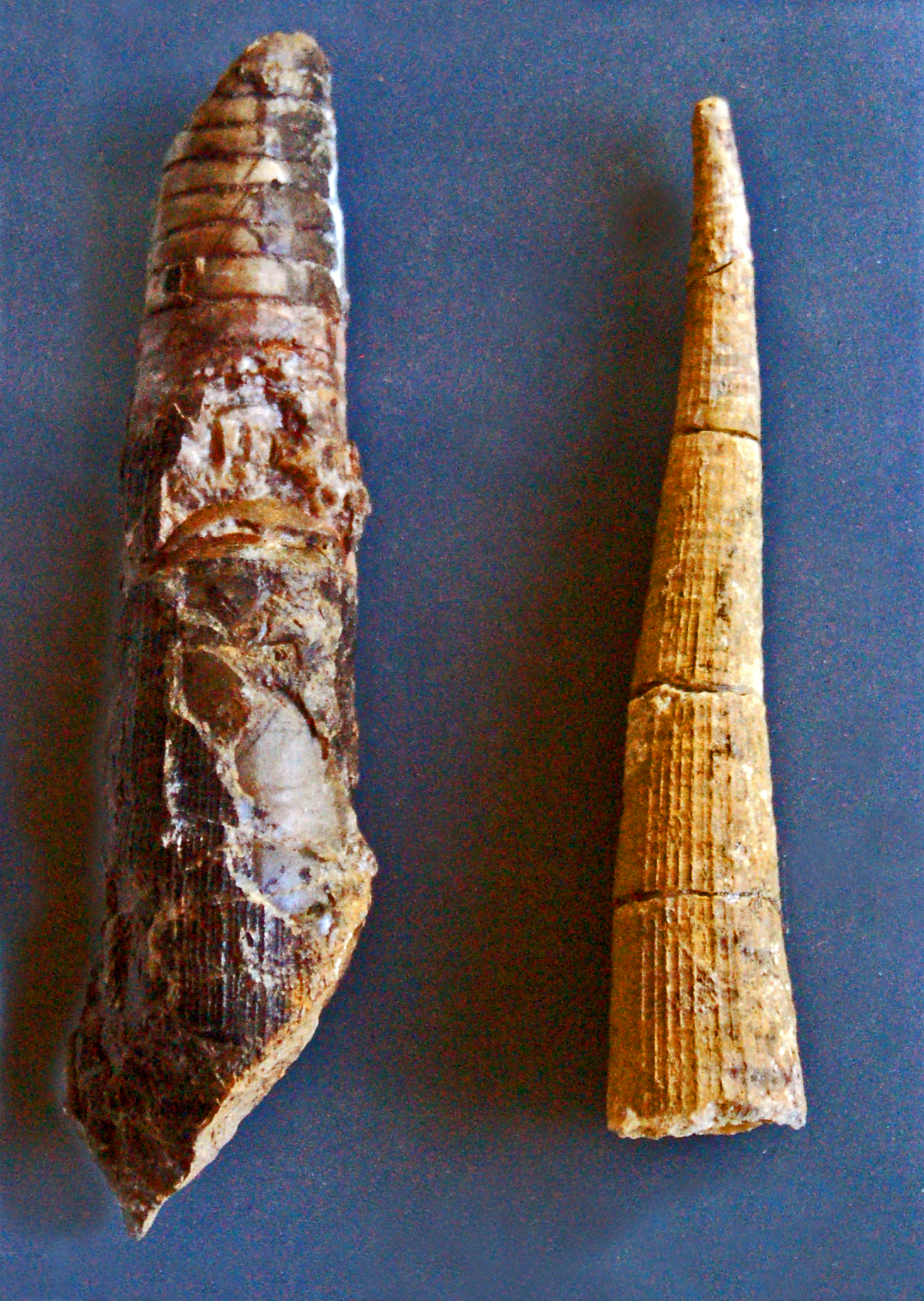
- Fossilized shells of the Middle Ordovician-Permian nautiloid cephalopod Kionoceras
  †Kionoceras
  - †Kionoceras scammoni
- †Kosovopeltis
  - †Kosovopeltis acamas
  - †Kosovopeltis acamus
- †Krausella

== L ==
- Lagenammina
- †Lambeophyllum
  - †Lambeophyllum profundum
- †Lampterocrinus
  - †Lampterocrinus inflatus
- †Leangella
  - †Leangella dissiticostella
- †Lecanocrinus
  - †Lecanocrinus waucoma
  - †Lecanocrinus waukoma
- †Lechritrochoceras
  - †Lechritrochoceras desplainense
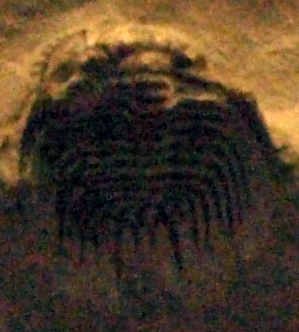
- Fossil of the Late Ordovician-Middle Devonian trilobite Leonaspis
  †Leonaspis
- †Leperditella
  - †Leperditella germana
- †Lepidocyclus
- †Leptaena
  - †Leptaena depressa
  - †Leptaena rhomboidalis
- †Leptodesma
  - †Leptodesma actualaris
- †Leptotrypa
  - †Leptotrypa hexagonalis
- †Lesueurilla
  - †Lesueurilla beloitensis
- †Leurocycloceras
  - †Leurocycloceras raymondi
- †Levicyathocrinites – tentative report
  - †Levicyathocrinites vanhorni
- †Lingula
  - †Lingula milwaukeensis
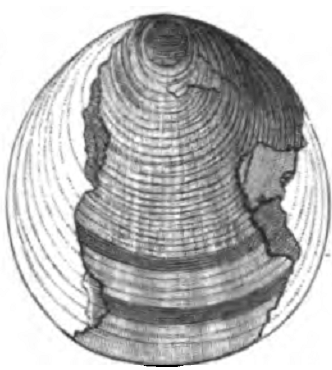
- Illustration of a fossilized shell of the Cambrian-Late Ordovician brachiopod Lingulella
  †Lingulella
- †Lingulepis
- †Lingulidiscina
  - †Lingulidiscina marginalis
- †Linnarssonella
- †Liospira
- †Litagnostus
- †Lonchocephalus
- †Lophospira
  - †Lophospira serrulata
- †Loxonema
  - †Loxonema leda
- †Loxoplocus – type locality for genus
  - †Loxoplocus gothlandicus
  - †Loxoplocus nelsonae – type locality for species
- †Lyriocrinus – tentative report
  - †Lyriocrinus melissa
- †Lysocystites
  - †Lysocystites nodosus

== M ==
- †Mackenziurus
  - †Mackenziurus lauriae
- †Maclurina
  - †Maclurina bigsbyi
- †Macropleura
  - †Macropleura eudora
- †Macroscenella
  - †Macroscenella superba
- †Macrostylocrinus
  - †Macrostylocrinus obconicus
  - †Macrostylocrinus semiradiatus – or unidentified comparable form
  - †Macrostylocrinus striatus – or unidentified comparable form
- †Manespira
  - †Manespira nicolleti – report made of unidentified related form or using admittedly obsolete nomenclature
- †Marsupiocrinus
  - †Marsupiocrinus chagoensis
- †Maryvillia
- †Matheria
  - †Matheria recta
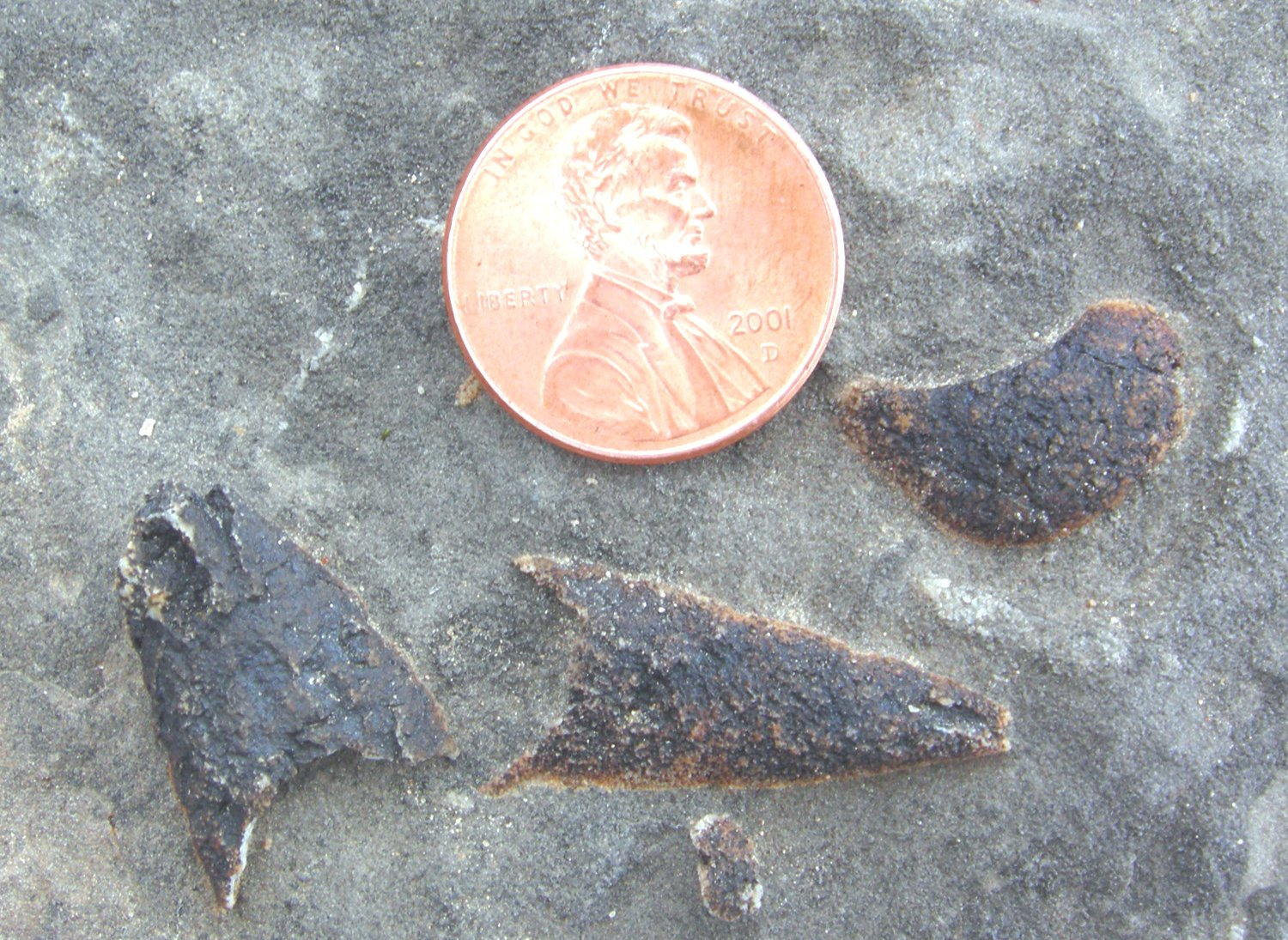
- Fossilized plates of the Cambrian-Early Ordovician chiton Matthevia
  †Matthevia
- †Megamyonia
- †Megastrophia
  - †Megastrophia profunda
- †Melocrinites
- †Menomonia
- †Merista
- †Meristina
- †Meroperix
- †Metaconularia
- †Metarizoceras
  - †Metarizoceras brevicorne
- †Metaspyroceras
  - †Metaspyroceras reudemanni
  - †Metaspyroceras ruedemanni
- †Michelinoceras
- †Milaculum
- †Monocheilus
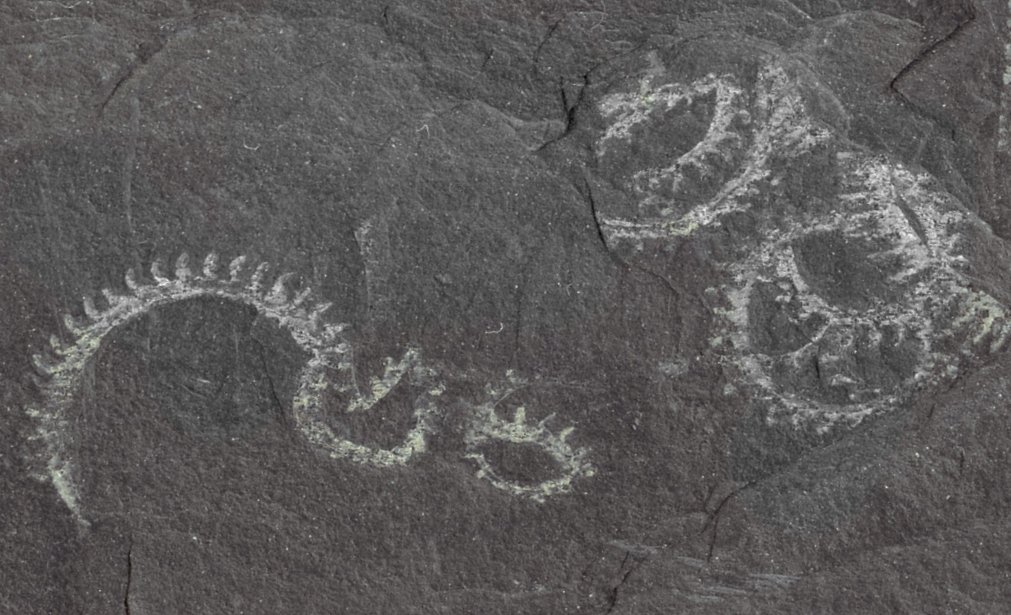
- Fossils of the Early Devonian graptolite Monograptus
  †Monograptus
  - †Monograptus spiralis
- †Monomuchites
  - †Monomuchites annularis
- †Morinorhynchus
- †Mosineia- type locality of the genus
- †Murchisonia
  - †Murchisonia conradi
  - †Murchisonia laphami
- †Myelodactylus
- †Mytilarca
  - †Mytilarca acutirostra

== N ==
- †Neozaphrentis
  - †Neozaphrentis racinensis
- †Norwoodia
- †Nucleospira

== O ==
- †Obolus
- †Oepikina
  - †Oepikina minnesotensis
- †Onniella
- †Ophiletina
  - †Ophiletina sublaxa
- †Ophioceras
  - †Ophioceras wilmingtonense
- †Opikina
- †Orbicudloidea
  - †Orbicudloidea telleri
- †Orbiculoidea
  - †Orbiculoidea doria
- †Oriostoma
  - †Oriostoma globosum
  - †Oriostoma pauper
- †Orthonata
- †Orthospirifer
  - †Orthospirifer milwaukeensis
- †Otarion
- †Otusia
- †Owenella
  - †Owenella antiquata
- †Oxoplecia
  - †Oxoplecia niagarensis
- †Ozarkodina
  - †Ozarkodina polinclinata – or unidentified comparable form

== P ==
- †Pagodia
- †Palaeocardia
  - †Palaeocardia cordiiformis
- †Palaeoneilo
  - †Palaeoneilo constricta
- †Palaeophycus
- †Panderodus
  - †Panderodus gracilis
  - †Panderodus greenlandensis
  - †Panderodus unicostatus
- †Parioscorpio- type locality of the genus
- †Paraliospira
  - †Paraliospira supracingulata – type locality for species
- †Parastophinella
  - †Parastophinella multiplicata
- †Parastrophinella
  - †Parastrophinella multiplicata
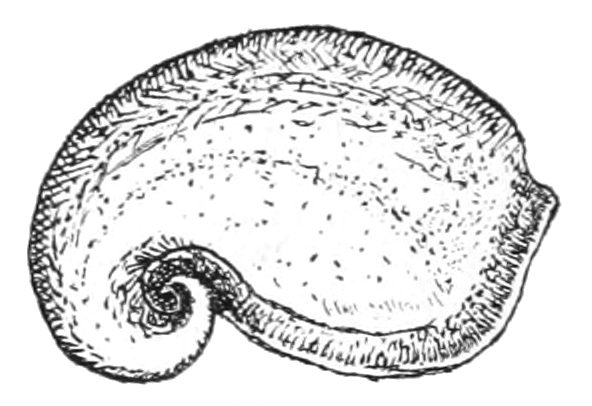
- Illustration of a fossilized shell in multiple views of the Paleozoic mollusc Pelagiella.
  †Pelagiella
- †Pemphigaspis
- †Pentamerella
  - †Pentamerella multicosta
- †Pentamerus
  - †Pentamerus oblongus
- †Pentlandia
  - †Pentlandia glypta
- †Pentlandina
  - †Pentlandina glypta
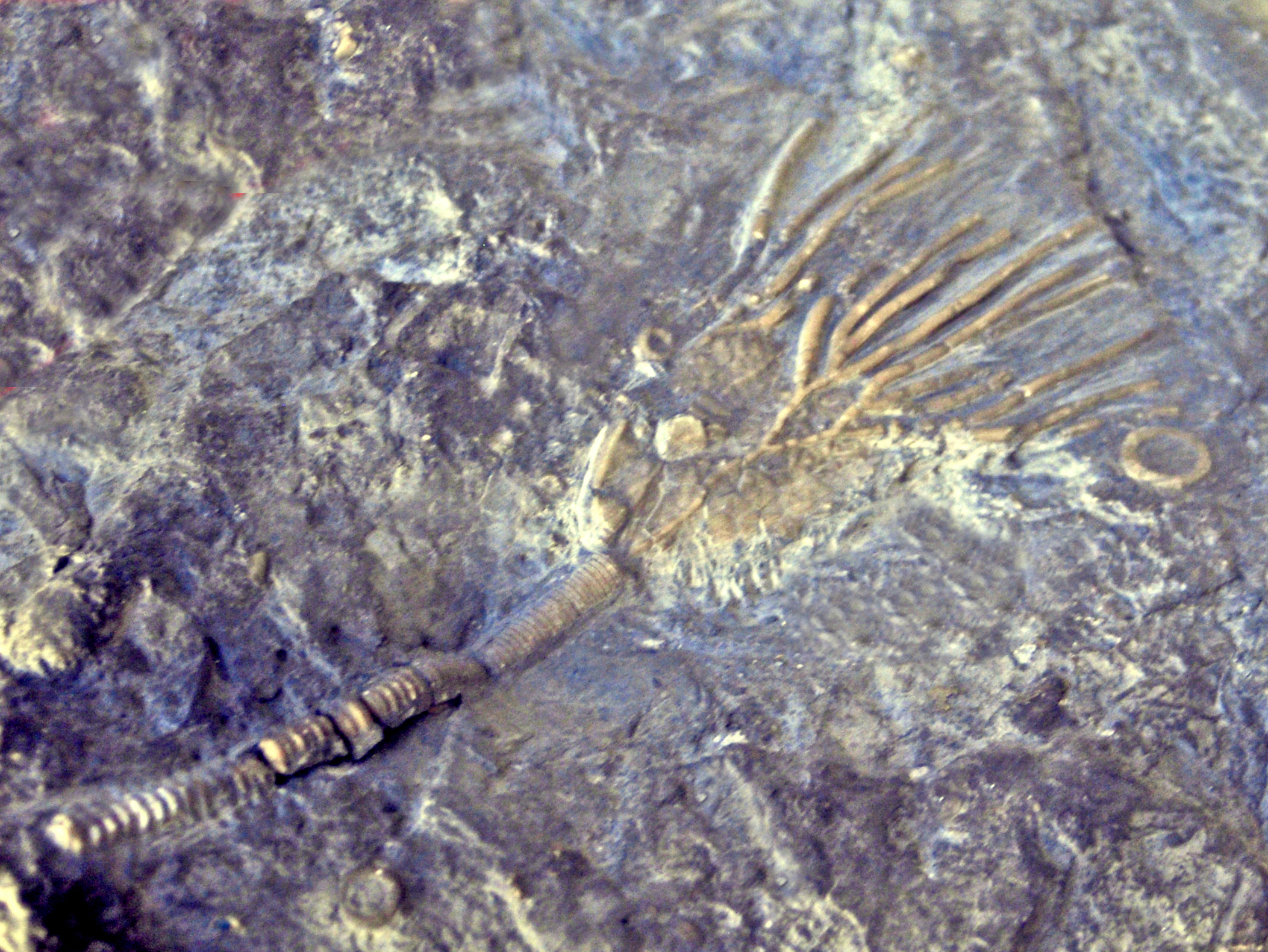
- Fossil of the Silurian-Carboniferous crinoid ("sea lily") Periechocrinus
  †Periechocrinus
  - †Periechocrinus infelix
  - †Periechocrinus necis
  - †Periechocrinus uniformis
  - †Periechocrinus urniformis
- †Periechorinus
- †Phanerotrema
  - †Phanerotrema occidens
- †Philhedra
  - †Philhedra magnacostata
- †Pholidostrophia
  - †Pholidostrophia iowensis
- †Phragmoceras
  - †Phragmoceras nestor
  - †Phragmoceras parvum
  - †Phragmoceras procerum
- †Phragmolites
  - †Phragmolites triangularis
- †Pionodema
  - †Pionodema conradi
- †Pisocrinus
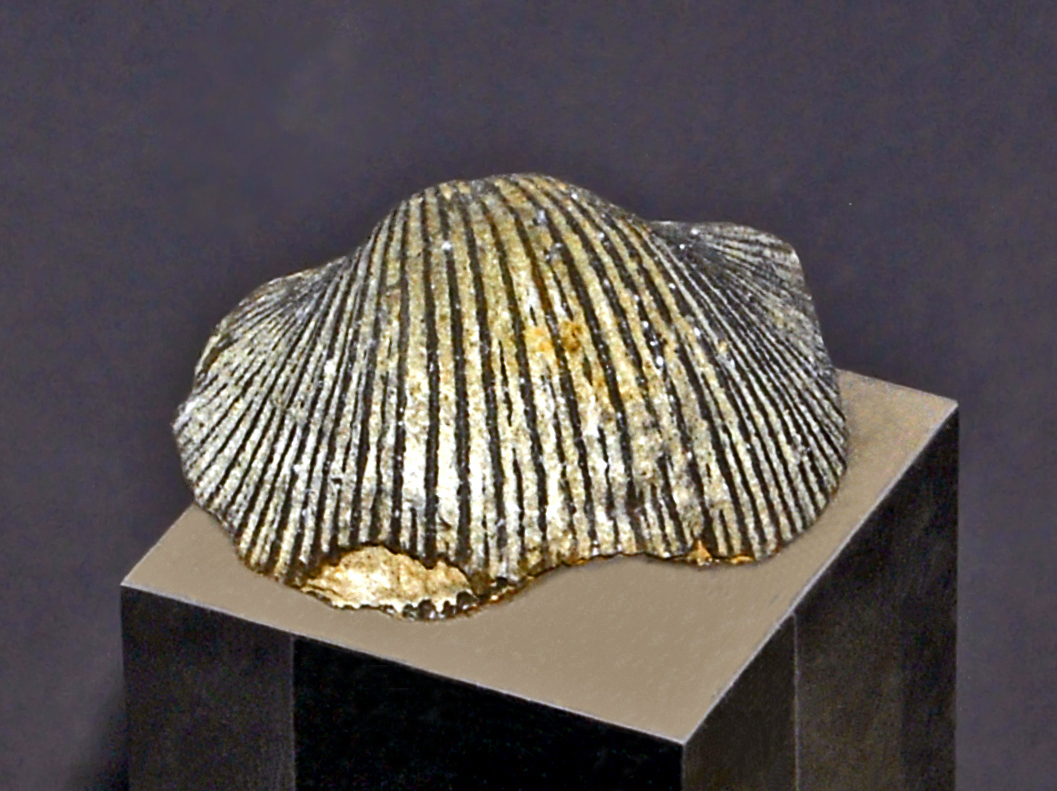
- Fossilized shell of the Ordovician brachiopod Plaesiomys
  †Plaesiomys
- †Plagiostomoceras
- †Planolites
- †Platyceras
  - †Platyceras niagarensis
  - †Platyceras wisconsinensis – type locality for species
- †Platystrophia
  - †Platystrophia biforata
- †Plectatrypa
  - †Plectatrypa imbricata
- †Plectodonta
- †Plethopeltis
- †Pleurodictyum
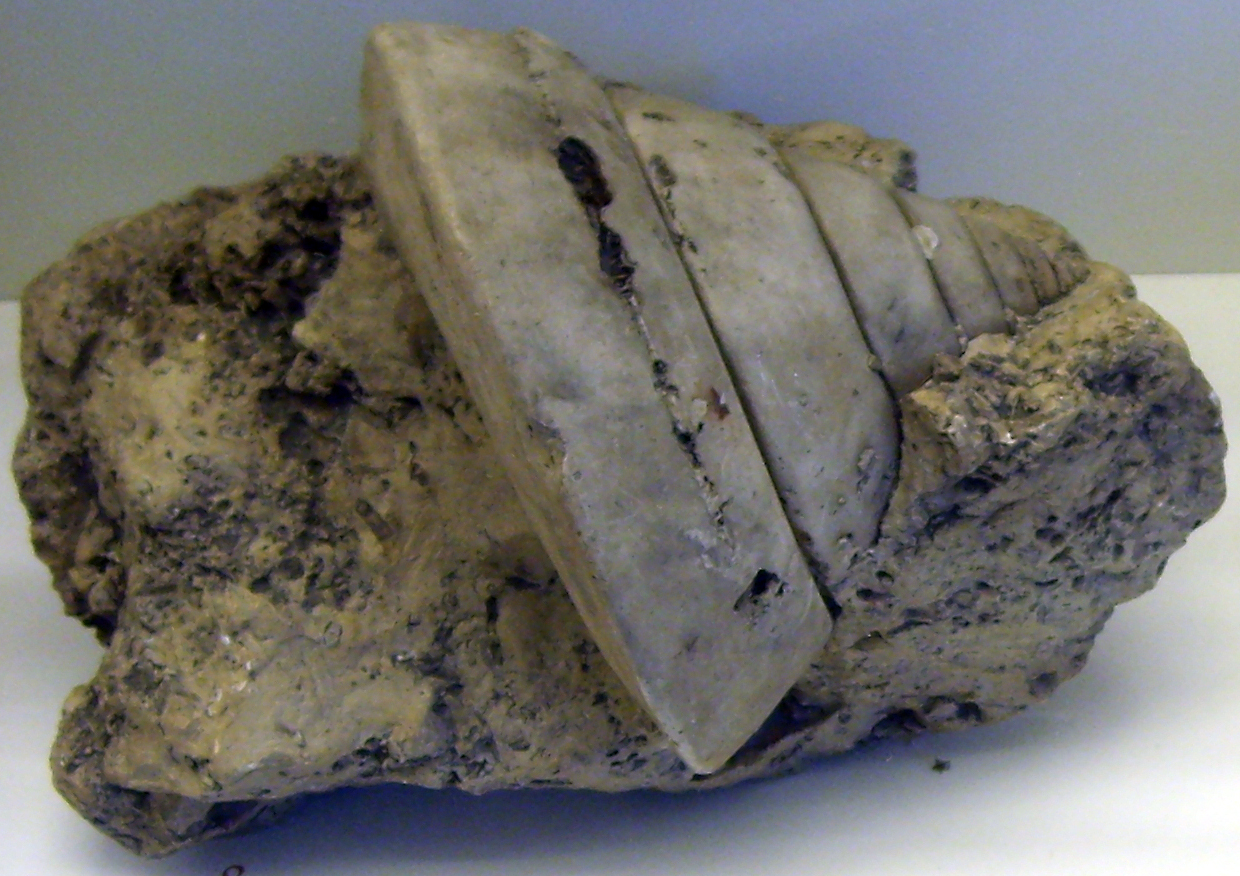
- Fossilized shell of a Pleurotomaria slit snail
  Pleurotomaria
  - †Pleurotomaria perlata
- †Polygnathoides
- †Polygrammoceras
- †Praenucula
- †Primitella
  - †Primitella constricta
- †Proagnostus
- †Proetus
  - †Proetus handwerki
- †Promelocrinus
  - †Promelocrinus obpramidalis
  - †Promelocrinus obpyramidalis
- †Proplina – tentative report
  - †Proplina extensum
- †Prosolarium
  - †Prosolarium halei
- †Protokionoceras
  - †Protokionoceras medullare
- †Protomegastrophia
- †Prozacompsus
- †Pseudagnostus
- †Pseudooneotodus
  - †Pseudooneotodus beckmanni
  - †Pseudooneotodus bicornis
- †Ptychaspis
- †Ptychocaulus
  - †Ptychocaulus bivittata
- †Ptychopleurella
- †Pycnocrinus
  - †Pycnocrinus gerki
- †Pycnomphalus
  - †Pycnomphalus solarioides

== R ==
- †Rafinesquina
- †Rasettia
- †Reserella
  - †Reserella canalis
- †Resserella
  - †Resserella canalis
- †Reticulatrypa
- †Rhombopteria
- †Rhynchotrema
- †Rhynchotreta
- Rostricellula
  - †Rostricellula minnesotensis
- †Ruedemannia
  - †Ruedemannia lirata
  - †Ruedemannia robusta
- †Rusosa

== S ==
- †Sactorthoceras
  - †Sactorthoceras depressum
- †Saffordia
- †Salmanites
  - †Salmanites platycaudatus
- †Salpingostoma
  - †Salpingostoma buelli
- †Saukia
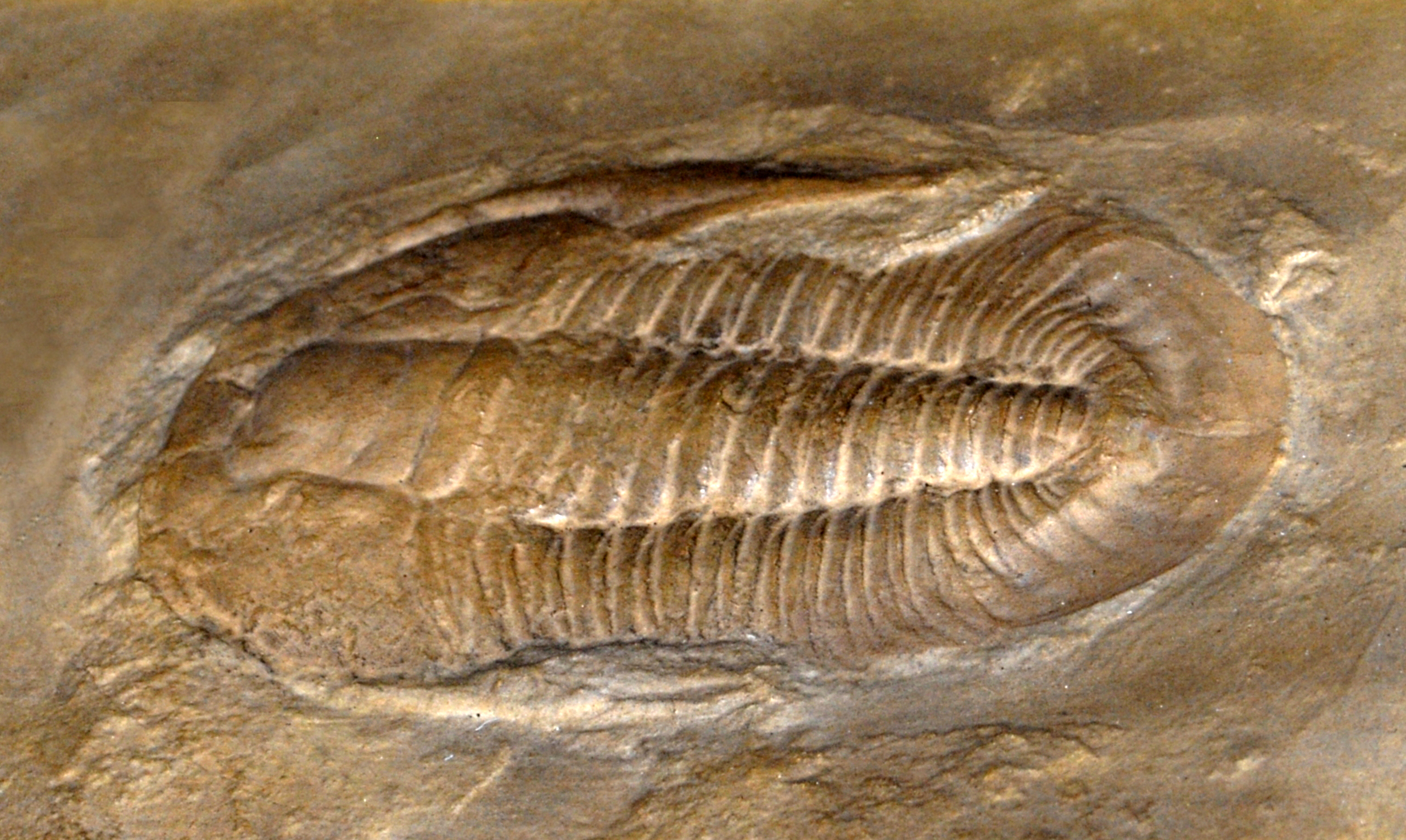
- Fossil of the Cambrian-Ordovician trilobite Saukiella
  †Saukiella
- †Scaevogyra
- †Scharyia
- †Schizonema
- †Schizopea
- †Schizophoria
  - †Schizophoria iowensis
  - †Schizophoria lata
- †Schmidtella
  - †Schmidtella crassimarginata
- †Scotoharpes
  - †Scotoharpes telleri
- †Scutellum
- †Similodonta
- †Sinuites
  - †Sinuites cancellatus
  - †Sinuites rectangularis – type locality for species
- †Sinuopea
  - †Sinuopea sweeti – type locality for species
- †Siphonocrinus
  - †Siphonocrinus armosus
  - †Siphonocrinus nobilis
  - †Siphonocrinus nobilus
- †Skenidioides
  - †Skenidioides anthonensis
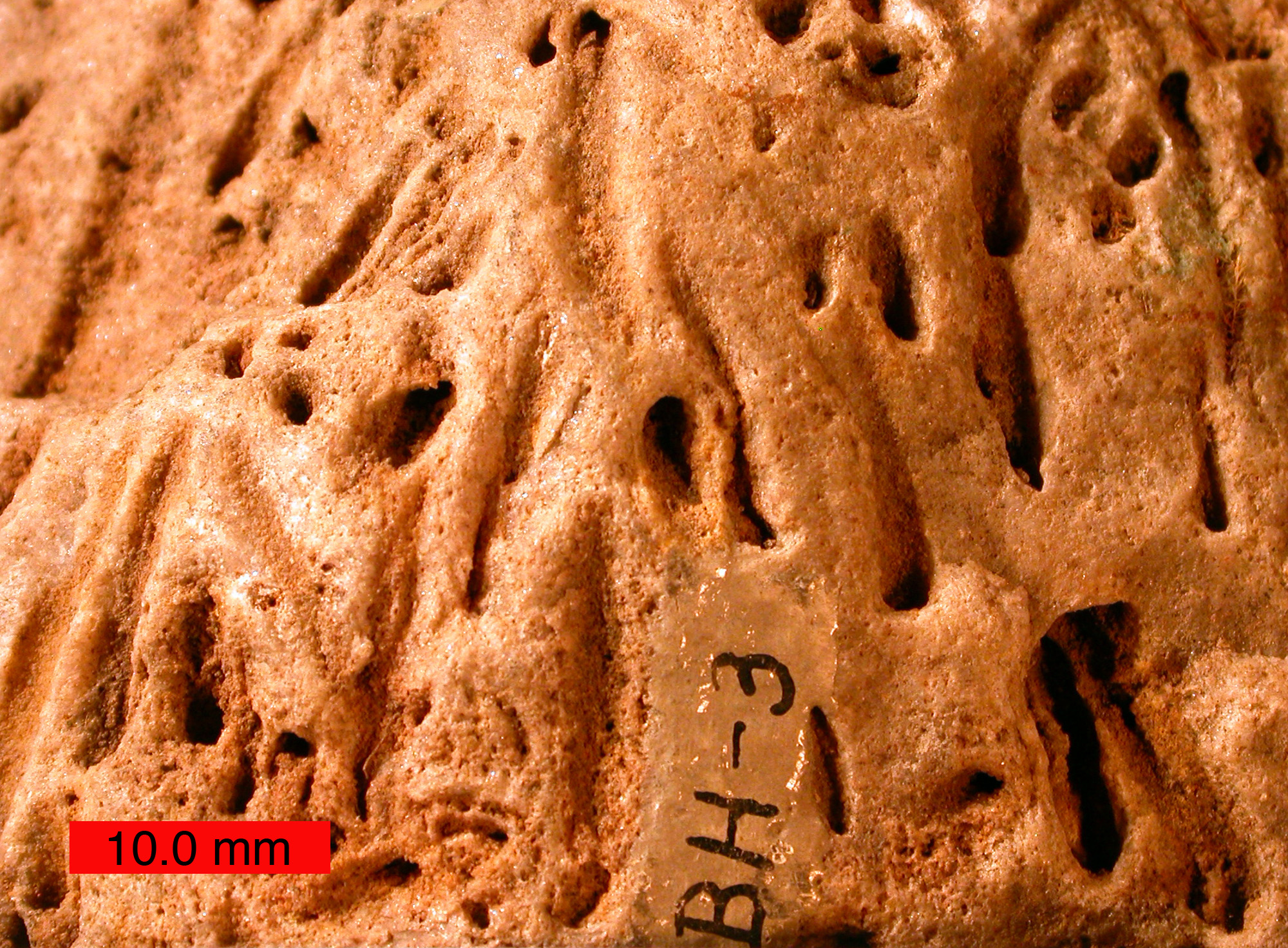
- Fossils of the Cambrian-modern worm burrow ichnogenus Skolithos
  †Skolithos
- †Sowerbyella
- †Sphaerexochus
  - †Sphaerexochus roemingeri
  - †Sphaerexochus romingeri
- †Sphaerirhynchia
- †Sphooceras
- †Spinatrypa
  - †Spinatrypa hystrix
  - †Spinatrypa spinosa
- †Spinocyrtia
  - †Spinocyrtia iowensis
- †Spirodentalium
  - †Spirodentalium osceola – type locality for species
- †Staurocephalus
  - †Staurocephalus obsoleta
- †Stegerhynchus
- †Stenopareia
  - †Stenopareia imperiator
- †Stenopilus
- †Stephanocrinus
  - †Stephanocrinus osgoodensis
- †Stictopora
  - †Stictopora trentonensis
- †Straparollus
  - †Straparollus mopsus
  - †Straparollus paveyi
- †Streptelasma
- †Striispirifer
- †stromatoporoids
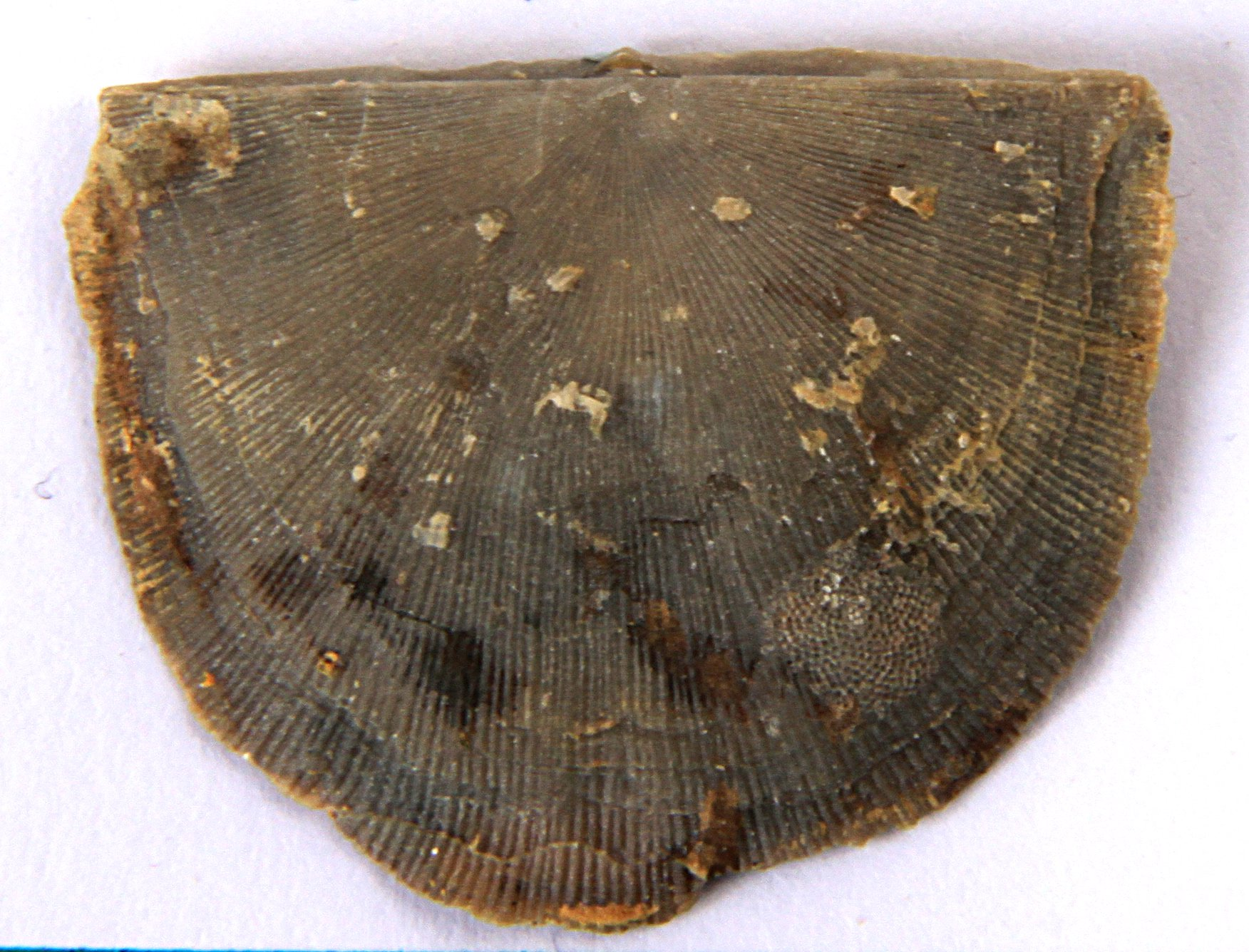
- Fossilized shell of the Ordovician-Silurian brachiopod Strophomena
  †Strophomena
  - †Strophomena costata
  - †Strophomena halli
  - †Strophomena plattinensis
- †Strophostylus
  - †Strophostylus elevatus
- †Subulites
  - †Subulites beloitensis – type locality for species

== T ==
- †Taenicephalus
- †Tancrediopsis
- †Tellerina
- †Tetranota
  - †Tetranota sexcarinata
  - †Tetranota wisconsinensis
- †Thalassinoides
- †Thaleops
- Thurammina
  - †Thurammina polygona
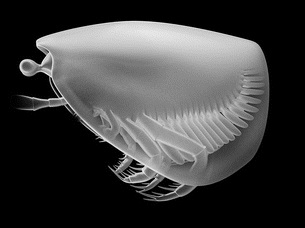
- Life restoration of the Silurian arthropod Thylacares
  †Thylacares – type locality for genus
  - †Thylacares brandonensis – type locality for species
- †Tremanotus
  - †Tremanotus angustata
- †Trocholites
- †Trochonema
  - †Trochonema beachi – tentative report
  - †Trochonema beloitense
- †Trochurus
  - †Trochurus welleeri
  - †Trochurus welleri
- †Tylothyris
  - †Tylothyris subvaricosa

== U ==
- †Uranoceras
  - †Uranoceras hercules

== V ==
- †Vanuxemia
- †Virgiana
  - †Virgiana mayvillensis
- †Venustulus (Type locality of the genus)

== W ==
- †Walliserodus
  - †Walliserodus curvatus
- †Westonia
- †Whitfieldella
- †Whitfieldoceras
- †Whitfieldia
- †Wilbernia
- †Wisconsinella – type locality for genus
  - †Wisconsinella clelandi – type locality for species
- †Woosteroceras
  - †Woosteroceras trempealeauense
- †Wurmiella
  - †Wurmiella excavata

== Z ==
- †Zaphrenthis
  - †Zaphrenthis racinensis
- †Zophocrinus – tentative report
