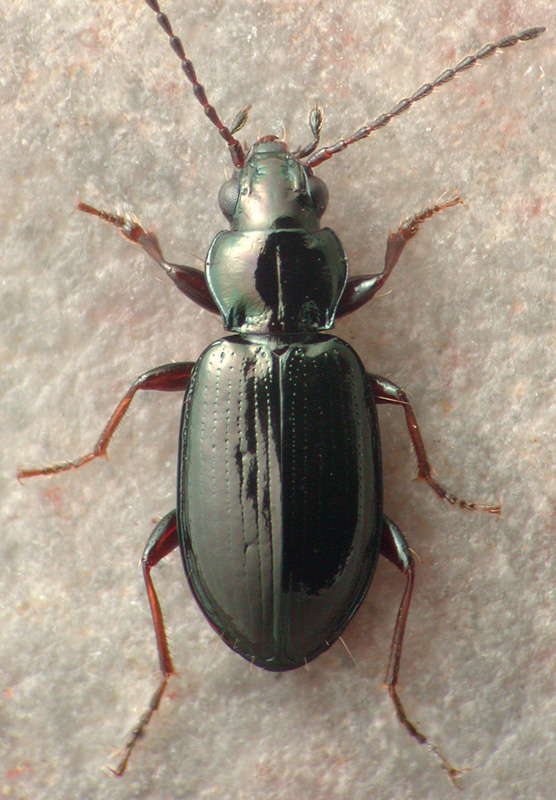

Scientific classification
- Kingdom: Animalia
- Phylum: Arthropoda
- Class: Insecta
- Order: Coleoptera
- Suborder: Adephaga
- Family: Carabidae
- Genus: Bembidion
- Species: B. grapii

Binomial name
- Bembidion grapii Gyllenhal, 1827

= Bembidion grapii =

Species of beetle

Bembidion grapii is a species of ground beetle in the family Carabidae. It is found in Europe and Northern Asia (excluding China) and North America.
