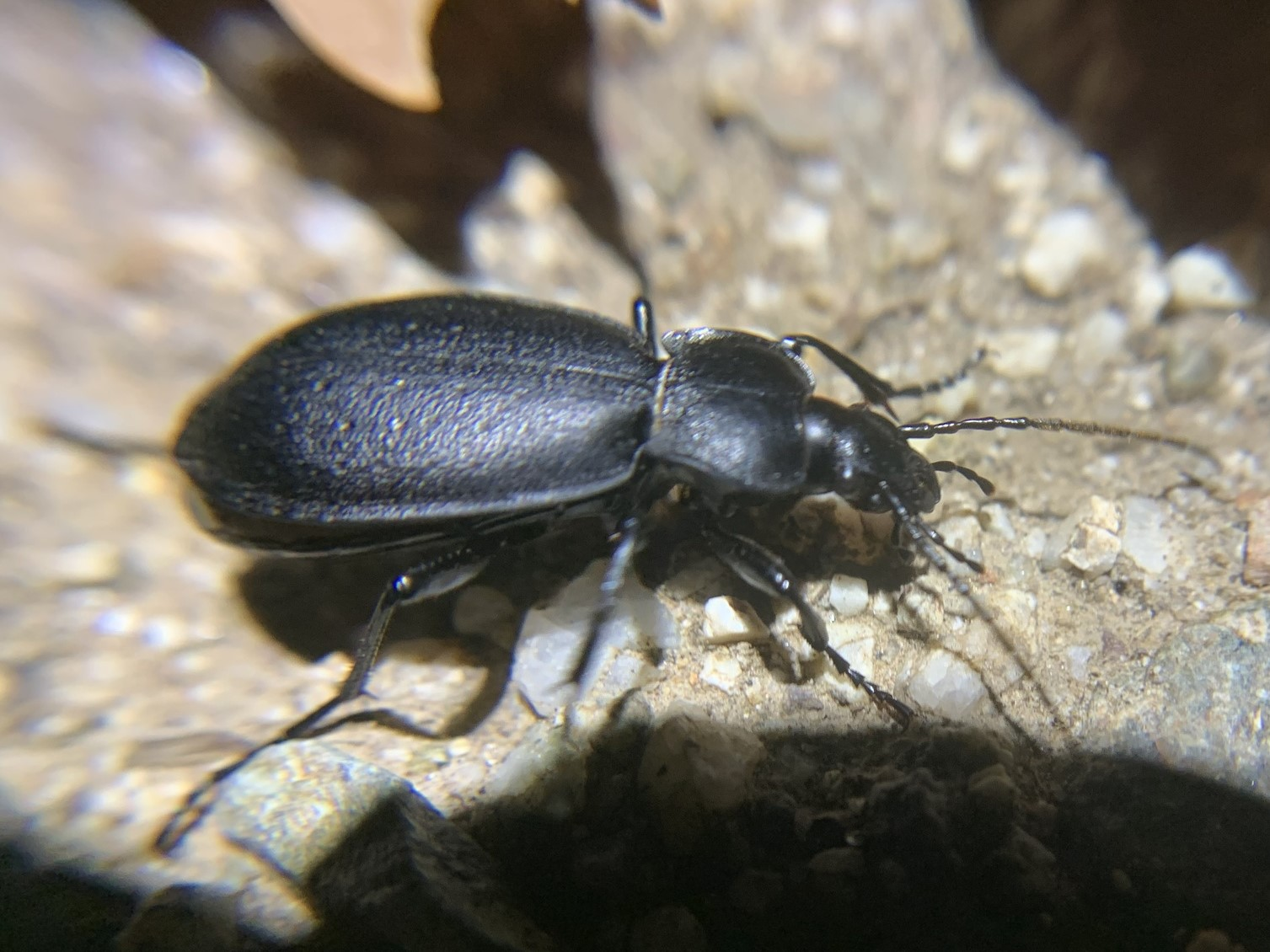

Scientific classification
- Kingdom: Animalia
- Phylum: Arthropoda
- Clade: Pancrustacea
- Class: Insecta
- Order: Coleoptera
- Suborder: Adephaga
- Family: Carabidae
- Genus: Carabus
- Species: C. taedatus

Binomial name
- Carabus taedatus Fabricius, 1787

Synonyms
- Carabus coloradensis Breuning, 1933; Carabus stocktonensis Casey, 1920; Carabus franciscanus Casey, 1913; Carabus montanicus Casey, 1913; Carabus patulicollis Casey, 1913; Carabus canadicus Roeschke, 1900; Carabus agassizi Heyden, 1879; Carabus gladiator Motschulsky, 1866; Carabus oregonensis LeConte, 1854; Carabus seriatus Wiedemann, 1821; Carabus baccivorus Fischer von Waldheim, 1820

= Carabus taedatus =

Species of beetle

Carabus taedatus is a species of ground beetle in the family Carabidae. It is found in North America.

== Subspecies ==
These four subspecies belong to the species Carabus taedatus:

- Carabus taedatus agassii LeConte, 1850
- Carabus taedatus bicanaliceps Casey, 1920
- Carabus taedatus rainieri Van Dyke, 1945
- Carabus taedatus taedatus Fabricius, 1787
