= Chippewaella =

Chippewaella Temporal range: Furongian

Scientific classification
- Domain: Eukaryota
- Kingdom: Animalia
- Phylum: Mollusca
- Genus: †Chippewaella
- Species: †C. patellitheca

Binomial name
- †Chippewaella patellitheca Gunderson, 1993

Genus of gastropods

Chippewaella patellitheca is a stem-gastropod mollusc from Furongian-aged strata of Late Cambrian Wisconsin. According to Peter J. Wagner, it is the most basal gastropod.

== Morphology ==
C. patellitheca is known from broad, low, cap-shaped or mound-shaped shells around 2 centimeters in diameter. The shell has a slight apex that points posteriorly, and is at the posterior end of a central dorsal ridge.
