= Leurocycloceras =

Leurocycloceras Temporal range: Silurian

Scientific classification
- Kingdom: Animalia
- Phylum: Mollusca
- Class: Cephalopoda
- Order: †Orthocerida
- Genus: †Leurocycloceras

Extinct genus of nautiloids

Leurocycloceras is an extinct genus of actively mobile carnivorous cephalopod, essentially a nautiloid, that lived in what would be North America, Europe, and Asia during the Silurian from 443.7—418.7 mya, existing for approximately 25 million years.

== Taxonomy ==
Leurocycloceras was assigned to Orthocerida by Sepkoski (2002).

== Morphology ==
The shell is usually long, and may be straight ("orthoconic") or gently curved. In life, these animals may have been similar to the modern squid, except for the long shell.

== Fossil distribution ==
Fossil distribution is exclusive to Great Britain, Wisconsin USA, and northern Ontario, Canada.
