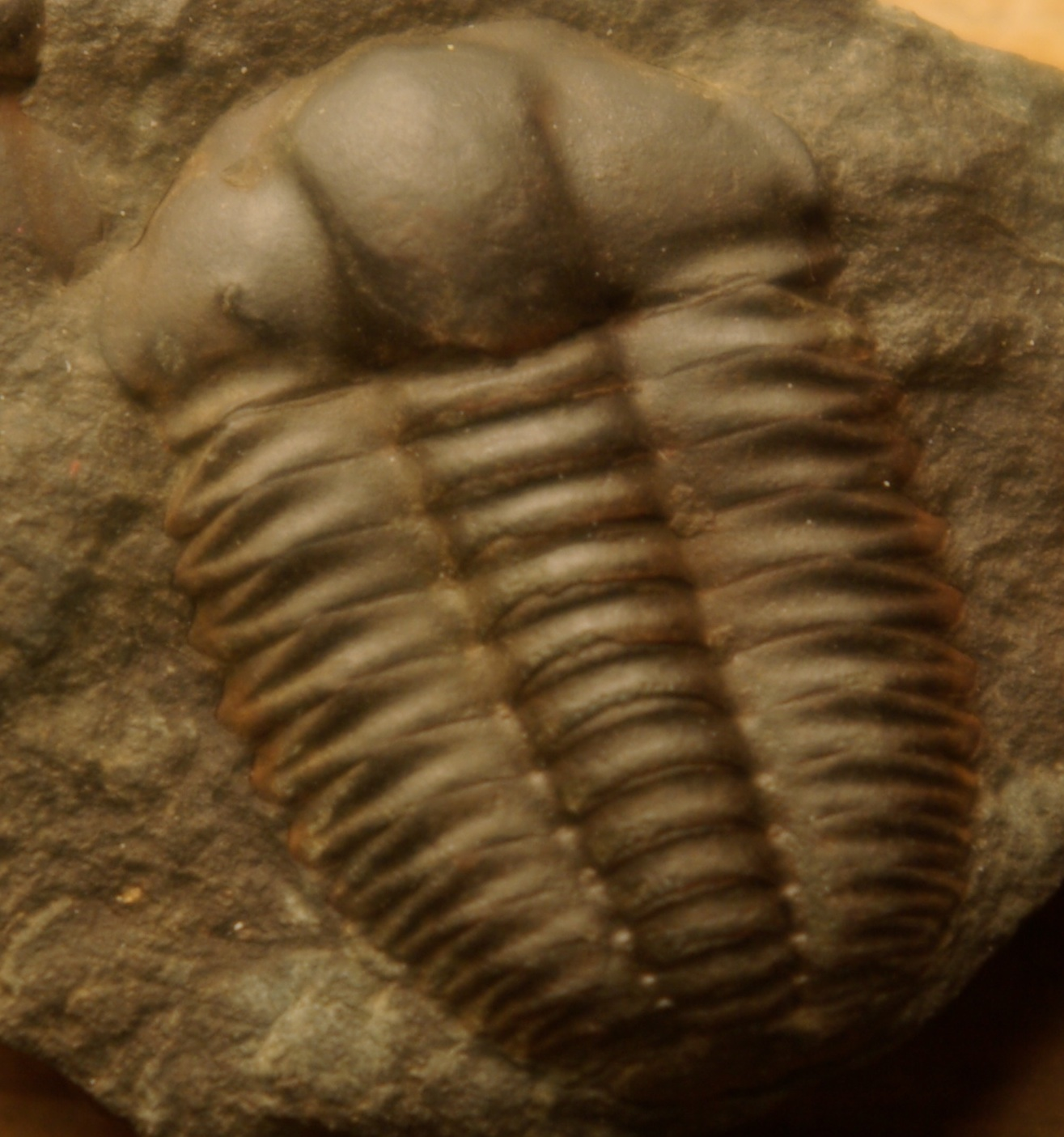
- Ellipsocephalus hoffi, Cambrian, Jince Formation, Czech Republic

Scientific classification
- Kingdom: Animalia
- Phylum: Arthropoda
- Clade: †Artiopoda
- Class: †Trilobita
- Order: †Ptychopariida
- Family: †Ellipsocephalidae
- Genus: †Ellipsocephalus; Zenker, 1833

Species
- E. hoffi (Schlotheim, 1823) = Trilobites hoffi; E. polytomus (Linnarsson, 1877); E. sanctacrucensis (Samsonovicz, 1959); E. vetustus (Pompeckj, 1895)

= Ellipsocephalus =

Ellipsocephalus Temporal range: 510–499 Ma Middle Cambrian

Genus of trilobites (blind)

Ellipsocephalus Zenker, 1833, is a genus of blind Cambrian trilobite, comprising benthic species inhabiting deep, poorly lit or aphotic habitats. E. hoffi is a common trilobite mainly from central Europe (Czech Republic).

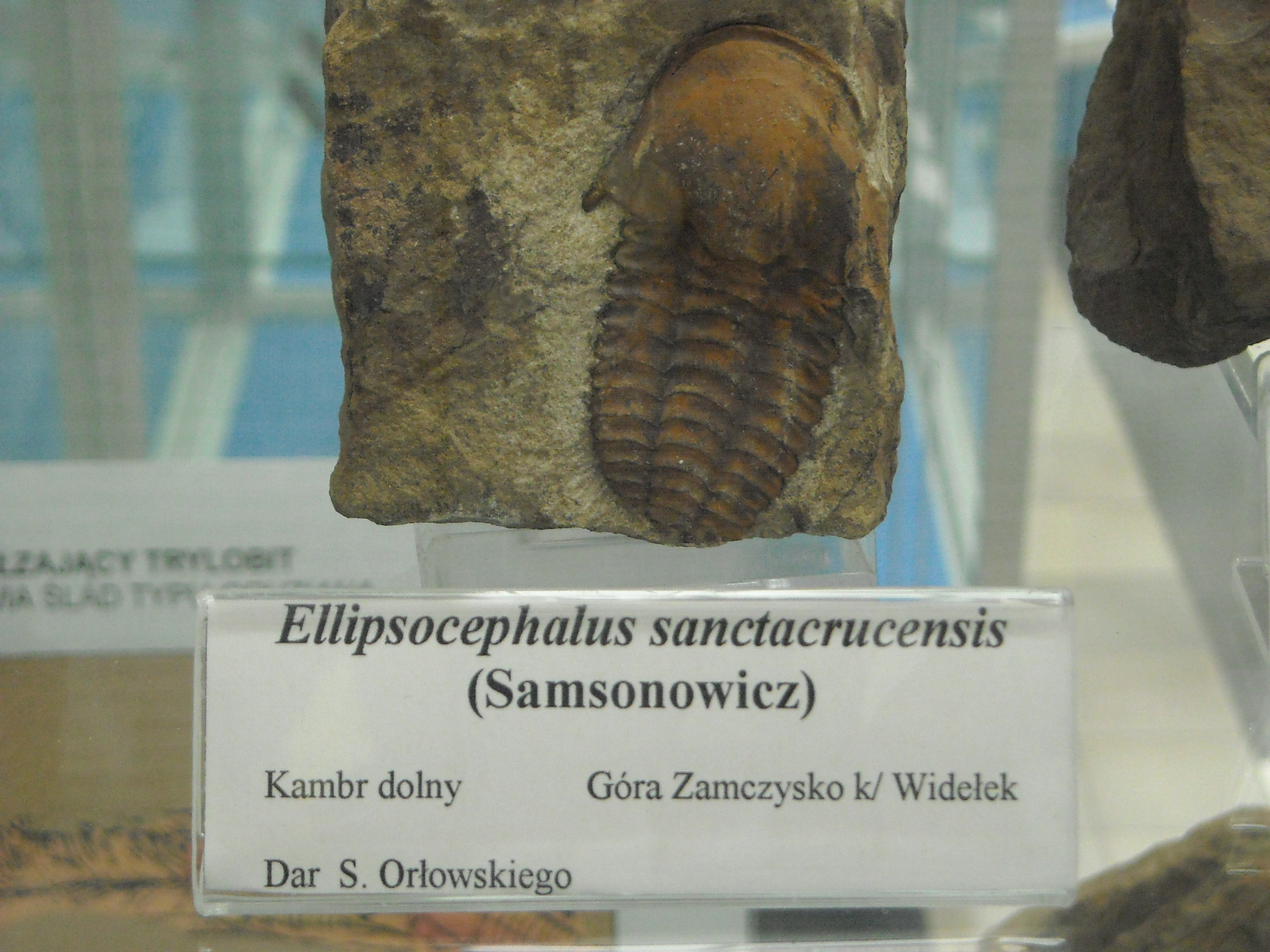
Ellipsocephalus sanctacrucensis

== Distribution ==
- Ellipsocephalus hoffi (Schlotheim, 1823) occurs in the Middle Cambrian of the Czech Republic, Jince Formation, Ellipsocephalus hoffi–Paradoxides (Rejkocephalus)–Lingulella Biozone of Fatka & Szabad (2014).
- Ellipsocephalus polytomus Linnarsson, 1877, is widely distributed in the ‘Oelandicus Beds’ (Baltoparadoxides oelandicus Biosuperzone) of Sweden and found near Viken, Näkten lake, Närke and Jämtland. The species is also known from drill cores retrieved from the island of Gotland, Sweden (e.g., Ahlberg 1989).
- Ellipsocephalus sanctacrucensis (Samsonowicz, 1959) is known from the Middle Cambrian of Poland (Słowiec Sandstone Formation, Paradoxides insularis and P. pinus-zones, near Brzechów, Holy Cross Mountains).

== Description ==
Ellipsocephalus is approximately oval in shape and markedly convex. It has opistoparian facial sutures that are directed slightly outward from both front and back of the eyes. The glabella has approximately parallel, slightly concave sides and is rounded frontally. Lateral furrows are indiscernible, as is the occipital ring. The palpebral lobes are not distinctly separated from the narrow occular ridges. The preglabellar field is somewhat inflated and librigenae are half as wide as the fixigenae. Some species have genal spines (as in E. sanctacrucensis), whereas in the most common species (E. hoffi) the genae lack spines and are only slightly angular posterolaterally. Ellipsocephalus has 12 thoracic segments and the pygidium is four times wider than long.

== Behaviour ==
Ellipsocephalus and some other primitive micropygous Cambrian genera, such as Bailiella, enroll differently from other trilobites so that the posterior thorax segments and pygidium bend under the thorax. This is called "double enrollment".

== Sources ==
- Trilobite info (Sam Gon III)
