= Echinochiton =

Echinochiton Temporal range: Middle Ordovician

Scientific classification
- Domain: Eukaryota
- Kingdom: Animalia
- Phylum: Mollusca
- Class: Polyplacophora
- Order: †Paleoloricata
- Family: †Echinochitonidae; Pojeta et al., 2003
- Genus: †Echinochiton; Pojeta et al., 2003
- Species: †E. dufoei

Binomial name
- †Echinochiton dufoei Pojeta et al., 2003

Extinct genus of molluscs

Echinochiton is an extinct genus of Ordovician chitons with hollow spines on its margins; these spines, which are unique among the chitons, have a strong organic component and show growth lines.
