= Lonchocephalus =

Lonchocephalus Temporal range: Dresbachian

Scientific classification
- Kingdom: Animalia
- Phylum: Arthropoda
- Clade: †Artiopoda
- Class: †Trilobita
- Order: †Ptychopariida
- Family: †Lonchocephalidae
- Genus: †Lonchocephalus; Owen, 1852

Lonchocephalus is an extinct genus from a well-known class of fossil marine arthropods, the trilobites. It lived from 501 to 490 million years ago during the Dresbachian faunal stage of the late Cambrian Period.
