= Pentlandia =

Scientific classification
- Domain: Eukaryota
- Kingdom: Animalia
- Phylum: Chordata
- Clade: Sarcopterygii
- Class: Dipnoi
- Family: †Dipteridae
- Genus: †Pentlandia; Watson & Day, 1916

Extinct genus of fishes

Pentlandia is an extinct genus of prehistoric sarcopterygians or lobe-finned fish. Its first discovered species was initially named Dipterus macroptera by Ramsay Traquair in 1888, then renamed Pentlandia macroptera by D.M.S. Watson and H. Day in 1916.

== See also ==
- Sarcopterygii
- List of sarcopterygians
- List of prehistoric bony fish
