= Geisonocerina =

Geisonocerina Temporal range: Ordovician-Permian

Scientific classification
- Kingdom: Animalia
- Phylum: Mollusca
- Class: Cephalopoda
- Order: †Orthocerida
- Family: †Geisonoceratidae
- Genus: †Geisonocerina; Foeste 1935

Genus of molluscs

Geisonocerina is an extinct genus from the carnivorous nautiloid cephalopod order Orthocerida that lived in what would be North America, Europe, and Asia during the Ordovician through Permian from 449 to 290 mya, existing for approximately 159 million years.

== Taxonomy ==
Geisonocerina was named by Foeste (1935) and included in the Geisonoceratidae as part of the Orthocerida where it is listed in Sepkoski (2002).

== Morphology ==
Geisonocerina has an orthoconic shell with transverse lirae and striae that are periodically thickened. Internal features are similar to Geisonoceras wherein the siphuncle is subcentral with short straight necks and connecting rings that expand slightly into the camerae and in which there are annulosiphonate deposits in the more adapical (juvenile)portion of the siphuncle and cameral deposits in the adapical (early) chambers.

== Fossil distribution ==
Geisonoceras has a widespread distribution covering North America, Europe, and Asia. A. K. Miller and W.M Furnish described Geisonocerina among a suite of 12 nautiloid genera from the Ordovician of the Black Hills, South Dakota. In Europe, Geisonocerina elongatocintum was identified from a 1973 borehole drilled in the Wenlock area of the Welsh borderland to provide a continuous core from the Llanocery-Wenclock boundary.
