= Distyrax =

Scientific classification
- Kingdom: Animalia
- Phylum: Arthropoda
- Clade: †Artiopoda
- Class: †Trilobita
- Order: †Phacopida
- Family: †Encrinuridae
- Genus: †Distyrax; Lane, 1988

Genus of trilobites

Distyrax is a genus of trilobites in the order Phacopida, that existed during the lower Silurian in what is now Greenland. It was described by Philip D. Lane in 1988, and the type species is Distyrax peeli. It also contains the species, Distyrax cooperi. The type locality was the Odins Fjord Formation.
