= Hadromeros =

Scientific classification
- Domain: Eukaryota
- Kingdom: Animalia
- Phylum: Arthropoda
- Class: †Trilobita
- Order: †Phacopida
- Family: †Cheiruridae
- Subfamily: †Cheirurinae
- Genus: †Hadromeros; Lane 1971

Type species
- †Hadromeros keisleyensis Reed 1896

Species
- †Hadromeros elongatus Reed 1931; †Hadromeros keisleyensis Reed 1896; †Hadromeros subulatus Linnarsson 1869

Extinct genus of trilobites

Hadromeros is an extinct genus of trilobite in the order Phacopida.
