= 2021 in arthropod paleontology =

2021 in arthropod paleontology is a list of new arthropod fossil taxa, including arachnids, crustaceans, insects, trilobites, and other arthropods that were announced or described, as well as other significant arthropod paleontological discoveries and events which occurred in 2021.

== Arachnids ==
=== New taxa ===
Name	Novelty	Status	Authors	Age	Type locality	Location	Notes	Images
Allochthonius balticus	Sp. nov	In press	Schwarze et al.	Eocene	Baltic amber	Europe (Baltic Sea region)	A pseudoscorpion belonging to the family Pseudotyrannochthoniidae.	
Alterphyxioschemoides	Gen. et sp. nov	Valid	Wunderlich & Müller	Cretaceous	Burmese amber	Myanmar	Possibly a member of the family Dipluridae. The type species is A. spicula.	
Alticorona	Gen. et sp. nov	Valid	Wunderlich in Wunderlich & Müller	Cretaceous	Burmese amber	Myanmar	A member of the family Tetrablemmidae. The type species is A. plenfemur.	
Autotomiana brevisetosa	Sp. nov	Valid	Wunderlich in Wunderlich & Müller	Cretaceous	Burmese amber	Myanmar	A member of Araneomorphae belonging to the family Pholcochyroceridae.	
Barbutia theroni	Sp. nov	Valid	Khaustov et al.	Late Eocene	Rovno amber	Ukraine	A mite belonging to the group Raphignathoidea and the family Barbutiidae.	
Boavista	Gen. et sp. nov	Valid	Wunderlich in Wunderlich & Müller	Cretaceous	Burmese amber	Myanmar	A spider belonging to the family Uloboridae. The type species is B. crassifemora.	
Burmadictyna crassembolus	Sp. nov	Valid	Wunderlich in Wunderlich & Müller	Cretaceous	Burmese amber	Myanmar	A spider belonging to the group Deinopoidea and the family Salticoididae.	
Burmadictyna fissura	Sp. nov	Valid	Wunderlich in Wunderlich & Müller	Cretaceous	Burmese amber	Myanmar	A spider belonging to the group Deinopoidea and the family Salticoididae.	
Burmadictyna similis	Sp. nov	Valid	Wunderlich in Wunderlich & Müller	Cretaceous	Burmese amber	Myanmar	A spider belonging to the group Deinopoidea and the family Salticoididae.	
Burmaspiralis	Gen. et sp. nov	Valid	Wunderlich in Wunderlich & Müller	Cretaceous	Burmese amber	Myanmar	A spider belonging to the group Araneoidea and the family Zarqaraneidae. The type species is B. trispinae.	
Burmesiana	Nom. nov	Valid	Wunderlich in Wunderlich & Müller	Cretaceous	Burmese amber	Myanmar	A spider belonging to the family Nemesiidae; a replacement name for Burmesia Wunderlich (2020).	
Burmorchestina bo	Sp. nov	Valid	Jiang & Li in Xin et al.	Cretaceous	Burmese amber	Myanmar	A spider belonging to the family Oonopidae.	
Burmorchestina convexa	Sp. nov	Valid	Jiang & Li in Xin et al.	Cretaceous	Burmese amber	Myanmar	A spider belonging to the family Oonopidae.	
Burmorsolus longitibia	Sp. nov	Valid	Wunderlich in Wunderlich & Müller	Cretaceous	Burmese amber	Myanmar	A member of Araneomorphae belonging to the family Burmorsolidae.	
Centrochthonius bitterfeldicus	Sp. nov	In press	Schwarze et al.	Eocene	Bitterfeld amber	Germany	A pseudoscorpion belonging to the family Pseudotyrannochthoniidae.	
Chaerilobuthus meggeri	Sp. nov	Valid	Lourenço in Lourenço & Velten	Cretaceous	Burmese amber	Myanmar	A scorpion belonging to family Chaerilobuthidae.	
Cornutheridion	Gen. et sp. nov	Valid	Wunderlich in Wunderlich & Müller	Cretaceous	Burmese amber	Myanmar	A spider belonging to the family Theridiidae. The type species is C. concavum.	
Crassicephalus	Gen. et sp. nov	Valid	Wunderlich in Wunderlich & Müller	Cretaceous	Burmese amber	Myanmar	A spider belonging to the group Deinopoidea and the new family Crassicephalidae. The type species is C. parvibulbus.	
Crassitibia sicilicula	Sp. nov	Valid	Wunderlich in Wunderlich & Müller	Cretaceous	Burmese amber	Myanmar	A spider belonging to the group Araneoidea and the family Zarqaraneidae.	
Cretaceousopisthacanthus	Gen. et sp. nov	Valid	Lourenço in Lourenço & Velten	Cretaceous	Burmese amber	Myanmar	A scorpion belonging to the family Protoischnuridae. The type species is C. smeelei.	
Cretapalpus	Gen. et sp. nov	Valid	Downen & Selden	Early Cretaceous	Crato Formation	Brazil	A spider belonging to the family Palpimanidae. Genus includes new species C. vittari.	
Dolichocybe elongata	Sp. nov	Valid	Khaustov et al.	Late Eocene	Rovno amber	Ukraine	A mite belonging to the group Heterostigmata and the family Dolichocybidae.	
Dubiodeinopsis	Gen. et sp. nov	Valid	Wunderlich in Wunderlich & Müller	Cretaceous	Burmese amber	Myanmar	A spider belonging to the group Deinopoidea and the new family Dubiodeinopsidae. The type species is D. spinifemora.	
Dubiouloborix	Gen. et sp. nov	Valid	Wunderlich in Wunderlich & Müller	Cretaceous	Burmese amber	Myanmar	A spider belonging to the group Deinopoidea and the new family Dubiouloboridae. The type species is D. incompletus.	
Dubiouloborus	Gen. et 2 sp. nov	Valid	Wunderlich in Wunderlich & Müller	Cretaceous	Burmese amber	Myanmar	A spider belonging to the group Deinopoidea and the new family Dubiouloboridae. The type species is D. praeta; genus also includes D. procerembolus.	
Electroblemma spermaferens	Sp. nov	Valid	Wunderlich in Wunderlich & Müller	Cretaceous	Burmese amber	Myanmar	A member of the family Tetrablemmidae.	
Eoagelenomorphus	Gen. et sp. nov	Valid	Wunderlich in Wunderlich & Müller	Cretaceous	Burmese amber	Myanmar	A spider of uncertain phylogenetic placement, possibly a member of an early branch of the RTA clade. The type species is E. cretaceus.	
Furcembolus chuandiani	Sp. nov	Valid	Jiang & Li in Xin et al.	Late Cretaceous	Burmese amber	Myanmar	A spider belonging to the family Pacullidae.	
Furcembolus fengzheni	Sp. nov	Valid	Jiang & Li in Xin et al.	Late Cretaceous	Burmese amber	Myanmar	A spider belonging to the family Pacullidae.	
Furcembolus martensi	Sp. nov	Valid	Jiang & Li in Xin et al.	Late Cretaceous	Burmese amber	Myanmar	A spider belonging to the family Pacullidae.	
Hiatomegops	Gen. et sp. nov	Valid	Guo, Selden & Ren	Cretaceous	Burmese amber	Myanmar	A spider belonging to the family Lagonomegopidae. Genus includes new species H. spinalis.	
Hoplocheylus neosimilis	Sp. nov	Valid	Khaustov et al.	Late Eocene	Rovno amber	Ukraine	A mite belonging to the group Heterostigmata and the family Tarsocheylidae.	
Hungarosilia	Gen. et sp. nov	In press	Szabó et al.	Late Cretaceous (Santonian)	Ajka Coal Formation	Hungary	A spider belonging to the family Hersiliidae. Genus includes new species H. verdesi.	
Kachinarachne	Gen. et sp. nov	Valid	Wunderlich in Wunderlich & Müller	Cretaceous	Burmese amber	Myanmar	A member of Araneomorphae belonging to the family Pholcochyroceridae. The type species is K. oblonga.	
Levantoglyphus	Gen. et sp. nov	Valid	Klimov et al.	Early Cretaceous (Barremian)	Lebanese amber	Lebanon	A mite belonging to the group Astigmata. The type species is L. sidorchukae.	
Liacarus (Procorynetes) shtanchaevae	Sp. nov	In press	Arillo & Subías in Arillo, Subías & Álvarez-Parra	Early Cretaceous (Albian)	Escucha Formation	Spain	A mite belonging to the family Liacaridae.	
Longissipalpus cochlea	Sp. nov	Junior homonym	Wunderlich in Wunderlich & Müller	Cretaceous	Burmese amber	Myanmar	A member of Araneomorphae belonging to the family Pholcochyroceridae. The specific name is preoccupied Longissipalpus cochlea Wunderlich (2017). Wunderlich (2022) coined a replacement name Longissipalpus aliter.	
Longissipalpus impudicus	Sp. nov	Valid	Wunderlich in Wunderlich & Müller	Cretaceous	Burmese amber	Myanmar	A member of Araneomorphae belonging to the family Pholcochyroceridae.	
Megasetae	Gen. et sp. nov	Valid	Wunderlich & Müller	Cretaceous	Burmese amber	Myanmar	A member of Araneomorphae belonging to the new family Megasetidae. The type species is M. colphepeiroides.	
Metaphalangium martensi	Sp. nov	Valid	Mitov, Perkovsky & Dunlop	Eocene	Rovno amber	Ukraine	A harvestman, a species of Metaphalangium.	
Micropalpimanus gibber	Sp. nov	Valid	Wunderlich in Wunderlich & Müller	Cretaceous	Burmese amber	Myanmar	A spider belonging to the group Palpimanoidea and the family Micropalpimanidae.	
Microtheridion	Gen. et sp. nov	Valid	Wunderlich in Wunderlich & Müller	Cretaceous	Burmese amber	Myanmar	A spider belonging to the family Theridiidae. The type species is M. longissispinae.	
Microuloborus oblongus	Sp. nov	Valid	Wunderlich in Wunderlich & Müller	Cretaceous	Burmese amber	Myanmar	A spider belonging to the family Uloboridae.	
Neoveterator	Nom. nov		Ceccolini & Cianferoni	Miocene	Mexican amber	Dominican Republic; Mexico	A spider belonging to the family Trochanteriidae; a replacement name for Veterator Petrunkevitch (1963).	
Orchestina globus	Sp. nov	Valid	Jiang & Li in Xin et al.	Cretaceous	Burmese amber	Myanmar	A spider belonging to the family Oonopidae, a species of Orchestina.	
Palaeodiplothrombidium	Gen. et sp. nov	In press	Rivas & Vega	Miocene	Mexican amber	Mexico	A mite belonging to the family Johnstonianidae. The type species is P. microscutum.	
Palaeoleptoneta fissura	Sp. nov	Valid	Wunderlich in Wunderlich & Müller	Cretaceous	Burmese amber	Myanmar	A spider belonging to the family Leptonetidae.	
Palaeothele onoi	Sp. nov	Valid	Selden	Carboniferous (Moscovian)	Mazon Creek fossil beds	United States (Illinois)	A spider belonging to the group Mesothelae and to the new family Palaeothelidae.	
Palaeozearchaea	Gen. et sp. nov	Valid	Wunderlich in Wunderlich & Müller	Cretaceous	Burmese amber	Myanmar	A spider belonging to the family Mecysmaucheniidae. The type species is P. depressa.	
Paradactylidium sineunguis	Sp. nov	Valid	Khaustov et al.	Late Eocene	Rovno amber	Ukraine	A mite belonging to the group Heterostigmata and the family Acarophenacidae.	
Parahistricostoma	Gen. et comb. nov	Valid	Mitov, Perkovsky & Dunlop	Eocene	Baltic amber Bitterfeld amber Rovno amber	Germany; Ukraine	A harvestman belonging to the family Nemastomatidae; a new genus for "Nemastoma" tuberculatum Koch & Berendt (1854).	
Paramiagrammopes appendix	Sp. nov	Valid	Wunderlich in Wunderlich & Müller	Cretaceous	Burmese amber	Myanmar	A spider belonging to the family Uloboridae.	
Paramiagrammopes curvatus	Sp. nov	Valid	Wunderlich in Wunderlich & Müller	Cretaceous	Burmese amber	Myanmar	A spider belonging to the family Uloboridae.	
Paramiagrammopes furca	Sp. nov	Valid	Wunderlich in Wunderlich & Müller	Cretaceous	Burmese amber	Myanmar	A spider belonging to the family Uloboridae.	
Paramiagrammopes granulatus	Sp. nov	Valid	Wunderlich in Wunderlich & Müller	Cretaceous	Burmese amber	Myanmar	A spider belonging to the family Uloboridae.	
Paramiagrammopes inaequalis	Sp. nov	Valid	Wunderlich in Wunderlich & Müller	Cretaceous	Burmese amber	Myanmar	A spider belonging to the family Uloboridae.	
Paramiagrammopes inclinatus	Sp. nov	Valid	Wunderlich in Wunderlich & Müller	Cretaceous	Burmese amber	Myanmar	A spider belonging to the family Uloboridae.	
Paramiagrammopes multifemurspinae	Sp. nov	Valid	Wunderlich in Wunderlich & Müller	Cretaceous	Burmese amber	Myanmar	A spider belonging to the family Uloboridae.	
Paramiagrammopes paracurvatus	Sp. nov	Valid	Wunderlich in Wunderlich & Müller	Cretaceous	Burmese amber	Myanmar	A spider belonging to the family Uloboridae.	
Paramiagrammopes pilosus	Sp. nov	Valid	Wunderlich in Wunderlich & Müller	Cretaceous	Burmese amber	Myanmar	A spider belonging to the family Uloboridae.	
Paramiagrammopes pollex	Sp. nov	Valid	Wunderlich in Wunderlich & Müller	Cretaceous	Burmese amber	Myanmar	A spider belonging to the family Uloboridae.	
Paramiagrammopes semiapertus	Sp. nov	Valid	Wunderlich in Wunderlich & Müller	Cretaceous	Burmese amber	Myanmar	A spider belonging to the family Uloboridae.	
Paramiagrammopes simplex	Sp. nov	Valid	Wunderlich in Wunderlich & Müller	Cretaceous	Burmese amber	Myanmar	A spider belonging to the family Uloboridae.	
Paramiagrammopes sulcus	Sp. nov	Valid	Wunderlich in Wunderlich & Müller	Cretaceous	Burmese amber	Myanmar	A spider belonging to the family Uloboridae.	
Paramiagrammopes texter	Sp. nov	Valid	Wunderlich in Wunderlich & Müller	Cretaceous	Burmese amber	Myanmar	A spider belonging to the family Uloboridae.	
Paramiagrammopes unibrevispina	Sp. nov	Valid	Wunderlich in Wunderlich & Müller	Cretaceous	Burmese amber	Myanmar	A spider belonging to the family Uloboridae.	
Planarchaea incompleta	Sp. nov	Valid	Wunderlich in Wunderlich & Müller	Cretaceous	Burmese amber	Myanmar	A spider belonging to the group Palpimanoidea and the family Planarchaeidae.	
Platythelae	Gen. et sp. nov	Valid	Wunderlich in Wunderlich & Müller	Cretaceous	Burmese amber	Myanmar	A spider belonging to the group Palpimanoidea and the family Planarchaeidae. The type species is P. longicorpus.	
Praetervetiator	Gen. et sp. nov	Valid	Wunderlich in Wunderlich & Müller	Cretaceous	Burmese amber	Myanmar	A spider belonging to the group Palpimanoidea and the family Vetiatoridae. The type species is P. circulus. The paper naming it also uses the spelling of the genus name Praetervetianus; both names refer to the same genus.	
Prionochthonius	Gen. et sp. nov	Valid	Wriedt et al.	Cretaceous	Burmese amber	Myanmar	A pseudoscorpion belonging to the family Chthoniidae. Genus includes new species P. burmiticus.	
Priscaleclercera christae	Sp. nov	Valid	Magalhaes et al.	Late Cretaceous (Cenomanian)	Burmese amber	Myanmar	A spider belonging to the family Psilodercidae.	
Proadactylidium fossibilis	Sp. nov	Valid	Khaustov et al.	Late Eocene	Rovno amber	Ukraine	A mite belonging to the group Heterostigmata and the family Acarophenacidae.	
Proalbiorix	Gen. et 2 sp. nov	In press	Geißler et al.	Late Cretaceous (Cenomanian)	Burmese amber	Myanmar	A pseudoscorpion belonging to the family Ideoroncidae. Genus includes new species P. gracilis and P. compactus.	
Proaraneoides lanceatum	Sp. nov	Valid	Wunderlich in Wunderlich & Müller	Cretaceous	Burmese amber	Myanmar	A spider belonging to the group Leptonetoidea and the family Protoaraneoididae.	
Procerclypeus	Gen. et sp. nov	Valid	Wunderlich in Wunderlich & Müller	Cretaceous	Burmese amber	Myanmar	A member of the family Tetrablemmidae. The type species is P. deformans.	
Procervetiator	Gen. et sp. nov	Valid	Wunderlich in Wunderlich & Müller	Cretaceous	Burmese amber	Myanmar	A spider belonging to the group Palpimanoidea and the family Vetiatoridae. The type species is P. fruticosus.	
Propterkachin bispinatus	Sp. nov	Valid	Wunderlich in Wunderlich & Müller	Cretaceous	Burmese amber	Myanmar	A spider belonging to the family Uloboridae.	
Propterpsiloderces similis	Sp. nov	Valid	Wunderlich in Wunderlich & Müller	Cretaceous	Burmese amber	Myanmar	A member of Araneomorphae belonging to the family Eopsilodercidae.	
Protolycosa suazoi	Sp. nov	Valid	Selden	Carboniferous (Kasimovian)	Atrasado Formation	United States (New Mexico)	A spider belonging to the group Mesothelae and the family Arthrolycosidae.	
Pseudokachin	Gen. et sp. nov	Valid	Wunderlich in Wunderlich & Müller	Cretaceous	Burmese amber	Myanmar	A spider belonging to the family Uloboridae. The type species is P. tuberculatus.	
Scopomegops	Gen. et sp. nov	Valid	Guo, Selden & Ren	Cretaceous	Burmese amber	Myanmar	A spider belonging to the family Lagonomegopidae. Genus includes new species S. fax.	
Scutuloborella	Gen. et sp. nov	Valid	Wunderlich in Wunderlich & Müller	Cretaceous	Burmese amber	Myanmar	A spider belonging to the group Deinopoidea and the new family Scutuloboridae. The type species is S. admirabilis.	
Scutuloboroides	Gen. et sp. nov	Valid	Wunderlich in Wunderlich & Müller	Cretaceous	Burmese amber	Myanmar	A spider belonging to the group Deinopoidea and the new family Scutuloboridae. The type species is S. pumilio.	
Scutuloborus	Gen. et sp. nov	Valid	Wunderlich in Wunderlich & Müller	Cretaceous	Burmese amber	Myanmar	A spider belonging to the group Deinopoidea and the new family Scutuloboridae. The type species is S. spiralembolus.	
Spiniarchaea	Gen. et sp. nov	Valid	Wunderlich in Wunderlich & Müller	Cretaceous	Burmese amber	Myanmar	A spider belonging to the family Archaeidae. The type species is S. aberrans.	
Spinicymbium unispina	Sp. nov	Valid	Wunderlich in Wunderlich & Müller	Cretaceous	Burmese amber	Myanmar	A spider belonging to the group Araneoidea and the family Zarqaraneidae.	
Spiniuloborus	Gen. et sp. nov	Valid	Wunderlich in Wunderlich & Müller	Cretaceous	Burmese amber	Myanmar	A spider belonging to the family Uloboridae. The type species is S. crux.	
Spinoburmesebuthus knodelorum	Sp. nov	Valid	Lourenço	Cretaceous	Burmese amber	Myanmar	A scorpion belonging to the group Buthoidea and the family Palaeoburmesebuthidae.	
?Telemofila ovalis	Sp. nov	Valid	Wunderlich in Wunderlich & Müller	Cretaceous	Burmese amber	Myanmar	A spider belonging to the family Telemidae, possibly a species of Telemofila.	
Tenuicephalus	Gen. et sp. nov	Valid	Wunderlich in Wunderlich & Müller	Cretaceous	Burmese amber	Myanmar	A member of the family Tetrablemmidae. The type species is T. penicillus.	

=== Research ===
- Revision of the fossil record of whip spiders is published by Haug & Haug (2021).
- Guo, Selden & Ren (2021) describe an adult lagonomegopid female, part of an egg sac and lagonomegopid spiderlings preserved in four pieces of Burmese amber, and interpret this finding as evidence of maternal care in fossil spiders.
- An exuvium of a member of the genus Myrmecarchaea is described from the Eocene Cambay amber (India) by Wood, Singh & Grimaldi (2021), representing the first member of the family Archaeidae from Cambay amber reported to date.
- An indeterminate deutonymph belonging to the family Sejidae is described by Joharchi, Vorontsov and Walter (2021) from Burmese amber, which represents the oldest record of the parasitiform mite clade Mesostigmata.

== Crustaceans ==
=== New taxa ===
==== Malacostracans ====
Name	Novelty	Status	Authors	Age	Type locality	Country	Notes	Images
Agolambrus rathbunae	Sp. nov	Valid	Schweitzer, Hyžný & Feldmann			Venezuela	A crab belonging to the family Parthenopidae.	
Aptanacalliax	Gen. et sp. nov	In press	Ferratges, Hyžný & Zamora	Early Cretaceous (Aptian)	Forcall Formation	Spain	A member of Axiidea belonging to the family Anacalliacidae. Genus includes new species A. enigma.	
Aptaxiopsis	Gen. et sp. nov	In press	Ferratges, Hyžný & Zamora	Early Cretaceous (Aptian)	Forcall Formation	Spain	A member of Axiidea. Genus includes new species A. longimanus.	
Autrigoniscus	Gen. et sp. nov	Valid	Sánchez-García et al.	Early Cretaceous (Albian)	Spanish amber	Spain	A member of Isopoda belonging to the family Trichoniscidae. The type species is A. resinicola.	
Bajoprosopon	Gen. et sp. nov	Valid	Van Bakel et al.	Middle Jurassic (Bajocian)		France	A crab belonging to the superfamily Homolodromioidea and the family Prosopidae. The type species is B. piardi.	
Bavaricaris	Gen. et sp. nov	Valid	Winkler	Late Jurassic (Tithonian)	Altmühltal Formation	Germany	A member of Caridea, possibly belonging to the family Palaemonidae. The type species is B. haereri.	
Berglundus	Gen. et sp. nov	In press	Nyborg et al.	Early to middle Miocene	Astoria Formation	United States (Washington)	A crab belonging to the group Cyclodorippoida and the family Cyclodorippidae. The type species is B. bretoni.	
Bericirinia	Gen. et sp. nov	In press	De Angeli & Garassino	Eocene (Priabonian)		Italy	A crab belonging to the family Epialtidae. The type species is B. bretoni.	
Blaculla anjobea	Sp. nov	Valid	Winkler	Late Jurassic (Tithonian)	Altmühltal Formation	Germany	A member of Caridea.	
Bucculentum arnosavelkouli	Sp. nov	Valid	Wallaard et al.	Late Jurassic (Tithonian)	Mörnsheim Formation	Germany	A crab belonging to the group Homolodromioidea and the family Bucculentidae.	
Bucculentum horstkuscheli	Sp. nov	Valid	Krzemińska et al.	Late Jurassic (Kimmeridgian)		Germany	A crab belonging to the group Homolodromioidea and the family Bucculentidae.	
Bucculentum plettenbergense	Sp. nov	Valid	Krzemińska et al.	Late Jurassic (Oxfordian)		Germany	A crab belonging to the group Homolodromioidea and the family Bucculentidae.	
Carpilius cantellii	Sp. nov	Valid	De Angeli & Alberti	Eocene (Bartonian-Priabonian)		Italy	A crab, a species of Carpilius.	
Cirolana aptiana	Sp. nov	In press	Bruce et al.	Early Cretaceous (Aptian)	Sierra Madre Formation	Mexico	A member of Isopoda, a species of Cirolana.	
Cirolana bretoni	Sp. nov	In press	Bruce et al.	Early Cretaceous (Aptian)	Sierra Madre Formation	Mexico	A member of Isopoda, a species of Cirolana.	
Cirolana longirostra	Sp. nov	In press	Bruce et al.	Early Cretaceous (Aptian)	Sierra Madre Formation	Mexico	A member of Isopoda, a species of Cirolana.	
Clampethildella	Gen. et sp. nov	Valid	Beschin, Busulini & Tessier	Eocene		Italy	A crab belonging to the family Mathildellidae. The type species is C. spinosa.	
Collodes cumarebensis	Sp. nov	Valid	Schweitzer, Hyžný & Feldmann			Venezuela	A crab belonging to the family Inachoididae.	
Cretacocalcinus	Gen. et sp. nov	In press	Ferratges, Hyžný & Zamora	Early Cretaceous (Aptian)	Forcall Formation	Spain	A hermit crab. Genus includes new species C. josaensis.	
Cretapsara	Gen. et sp. nov	Valid	Luque in Luque et al.	Late Cretaceous (Cenomanian)	Burmese amber	Myanmar	A crab belonging to the group Eubrachyura and to the new family Cretapsaridae. The type species is C. athanata.	
Cristinagalathea	Gen. et sp. nov	Valid	Beschin, Busulini & Tessier	Eocene		Italy	A member of the family Munidopsidae. The type species is C. striata.	
Crosniera forcallensis	Sp. nov	In press	Ferratges, Hyžný & Zamora	Early Cretaceous (Aptian)	Forcall Formation	Spain	A member of Axiidea belonging to the family Callianideidae.	
Cryptolacruma	Gen. et sp. nov	Valid	Schädel et al.	Late Cretaceous (Cenomanian)	Burmese amber	Myanmar	A member of Isopoda belonging to the group Epicaridea. The type species is C. nidis.	
Daciapagurus suebiorum	Sp. nov	Valid	Fraaije, Van Bakel & Jagt	Late Jurassic (Kimmeridgian)		Germany	A hermit crab belonging to the family Schobertellidae.	
Electrolana	Gen. et sp. nov	Disputed	Schädel, Hyžný & Haug	Late Cretaceous (Cenomanian)	Burmese amber	Myanmar	A member of Isopoda belonging to the group Cymothoida. The type species is E. madelineae. Bruce & Rodcharoen (2023) considered Electrolana to be a junior synonym of the genus Cirolana, though the authors maintained E. madelineae as a distinct species within the latter genus.	
Emplastron	Gen. et comb. nov	Valid	O'Flynn, Audo & Kawai	Paleocene (Thanetian)		France	A member of the family Astacidae; a new genus for "Astacus" edwardsi Van Straelen (1928).	
Eocalcinus gerardbretoni	Sp. nov	Valid	Ferratges, Artal & Zamora	Eocene (Priabonian)	Arguis Formation	Spain	A hermit crab belonging to the family Calcinidae.	
Eoinachoides bretoni	Sp. nov	In press	Garassino, Feldmann & Schweitzer	Eocene (Bartonian)	Castle Hayne Limestone	United States (North Carolina)	A crab belonging to the family Epialtidae.	
Eoligiiscus	Gen. et sp. nov	Valid	Sánchez-García et al.	Early Cretaceous (Albian)	Spanish amber	Spain	A member of Isopoda belonging to the family Ligiidae. The type species is E. tarraconensis.	
Ethusa orgianensis	Sp. nov	Valid	De Angeli & Garassino	Late Eocene		Italy	A crab, a species of Ethusa.	
Gammaroidorum yooling	Sp. nov	Valid	Wei et al.	Late Neogene	Xiaobai Formation	China	A member of Amphipoda.	
Glypheopsis tubantiensis	Sp. nov	Valid	Becker, Fraaije & Mulder	Early Cretaceous		Netherlands	A member of the family Glypheidae.	
Harthofia heidenreichetfauseri	Sp. nov	Valid	Winkler	Late Jurassic (Tithonian)	Altmühltal Formation	Germany	A member of Caridea.	
Heraclitus	Gen. et sp. nov	Valid	Sánchez-García et al.	Early Cretaceous (Albian)	Spanish amber	Spain	A member of Isopoda belonging to the group Crinocheta, possibly a member of the family Detonidae. The type species is H. helenae.	
Homarus fami	Sp. nov	Valid	Garassino, Pasini & Nyborg in Garassino et al.	Early Cretaceous (Albian)		Canada (British Columbia)	A species of Homarus.	
Hoploparia bretoni	Sp. nov	In press	Feldmann & Schweitzer	Late Cretaceous (Campanian)	Point Loma Formation	United States (California)	A lobster.	
Jurastenopus	Gen. et sp. nov	Valid	Winkler et al.	Late Jurassic (Tithonian)	Painten Formation	Germany	A member of Stenopodidea. The type species is J. frattigianii.	
Linuparus qualitus	Sp. nov	Valid	Feldmann et al.	Late Cretaceous (Turonian)	Kaskapau Formation	Canada (British Columbia)	A species of Linuparus.	
Mecochirus tuberculatus	Sp. nov	Valid	Garassino, Pasini & Nyborg in Garassino et al.	Early Cretaceous (Albian)		Canada (British Columbia)	A member of the family Mecochiridae.	
Metanephrops serendipitus	Sp. nov	Valid	Gašparič et al.	Early Miocene		Slovenia	A species of Metanephrops. Announced in 2021; validated in 2023.	
Meticonaxius gracilis	Sp. nov	In press	Ferratges, Hyžný & Zamora	Early Cretaceous (Aptian)	Forcall Formation	Spain	A member of Axiidea.	
Meyeria libanotica	Sp. nov	Valid	Charbonnier et al.	Early Cretaceous (Barremian)		Lebanon	A member of the family Mecochiridae.	
Miocrangon	Gen. et sp. nov	Valid	Garassino, Pasini & Nazarkin	Miocene		Russia (Sakhalin Oblast)	A member of the family Crangonidae. Genus includes new species M. tartaricus.	
Mothocya vallecillae	Sp. nov	In press	Stinnesbeck et al.	Late Cretaceous (Turonian)		Mexico	A member of Isopoda belonging to the family Cymothoidae.	
Muellermunida	Gen. et comb. nov	Valid	Beschin, Busulini & Tessier	Eocene	Szépvölgy Formation	Hungary; Italy	A member of the family Munididae. The type species is "Protomunida" pentacantha Müller & Collins (1991); genus also includes "Eumunida" veronensis Beschin, Busulini & Tessier in Beschin et al. (2019).	
Nahecaris sabineae	Sp. nov	Valid	Poschmann	Devonian (Emsian)		Germany	A member of Phyllocarida.	
Orgianocarcinus	Gen. et sp. nov	In press	De Angeli & Garassino	Eocene (Priabonian)		Italy	A crab belonging to the family Dairidae. The type species is O. bericus.	
Palaeastacus haidaensis	Sp. nov	Valid	Garassino, Pasini & Nyborg in Garassino et al.	Early Cretaceous (Albian)		Canada (British Columbia)	A member of the family Erymidae.	
Paradasygyius rodriguezi	Sp. nov	Valid	Lima, Aguilera & Tavares	Late Miocene		Venezuela	A spider crab belonging to the family Inachoididae.	
Parapetrochirus	Gen. et sp. nov	Valid	Ferratges, Artal & Zamora	Eocene (Ypresian)	Roda Formation	Spain	A hermit crab belonging to the family Diogenidae. The type species is P. robustus.	
Paromola bretoni	Sp. nov	Valid	Ferratges, Domínguez & Ossó	Eocene (Ypresian)	Roda Formation	Spain	A crab belonging to the family Homolidae.	
Paronapaguropsis	Gen. et sp. nov	Valid	Beschin et al.	Late Eocene		Italy	A hermit crab. Genus includes new species P. scaligera.	
Parvucymoides	Gen. et sp. nov	Valid	Van der Wal et al.	Late Eocene		Czech Republic	An isopod belonging to the family Cymothoidae. The type species is P. dvorakorum.	
Petersbuchia	Gen. et sp. nov	Valid	Schweigert	Late Jurassic (Kimmeridgian)	Treuchtlingen Formation	Germany	A crab belonging to the group Homolodromioidea and the family Prosopidae. The type species is P. thauckei. Announced in 2021 in an online-only journal; validated in 2023.	
Plakolana chiapaneca	Sp. nov	Valid	Bruce et al.	Early Cretaceous (Aptian)	Sierra Madre Formation	Mexico	A member of Isopoda belonging to the group Cymothoida. Originally described as a species of Plakolana, but subsequently made the type species of the separate genus Pseudoplakolana.	
Platuropodus	Gen. et sp. nov	Valid	Pazinato et al.	Permian (Kungurian)	Irati Formation	Brazil	A member of Isopoda. The type species is P. odysseus.	
Protaxius paucisaetosus	Sp. nov	In press	Andrada et al.	Early Cretaceous (Hauterivian)	Agrio Formation	Argentina	A member of the family Axiidae.	
Pseudonecrocarcinus eichhorni	Sp. nov	In press	Nyborg et al.	Late Cretaceous (Coniacian)		United States (Montana)	A crab belonging to the group Raninoida and the family Paranecrocarcinidae.	
Stenodactylina shotoverigiganti	Sp. nov	Valid	Devillez & Charbonnier	Late Jurassic (Oxfordian)		United Kingdom	A member of Erymoidea.	
Tyrannosculda	Gen. et sp. nov	Valid	Haug & Haug	Late Jurassic (Tithonian)	Altmühltal Group (Eichstätt Subformation)	Germany	A mantis shrimp. The type species is T. laurae.	
Vicetitrapezia	Gen. et sp. nov	Valid	Beschin, Busulini & Tessier	Eocene		Italy	A crab belonging to the superfamily Trapezioidea; the type genus of the new family Vicetitrapeziidae. The type species is V. exaltissimo.	
Willinachoides	Gen. et sp. nov	Valid	Lima, Aguilera & Tavares	Early-middle Miocene		Brazil	A spider crab belonging to the family Inachoididae. Genus includes new species W. santanai.	
Xanthodius falconensis	Sp. nov	Valid	Schweitzer, Hyžný & Feldmann			Venezuela	A species of Xanthodius.	
Xiaopenaeus	Gen. et sp. nov	Valid	Xing et al.	Late Cretaceous (Cenomanian)	Burmese amber	Myanmar	A member of the family Penaeidae. Genus includes new species X. electrinus.	

==== Ostracods ====
Name	Novelty	Status	Authors	Age	Type locality	Country	Notes	Images
Aracajuia separatta	Sp. nov	In press	Vázquez García et al.	Cretaceous (Albian–Cenomanian)	Riachuelo Formation	Brazil		
Aurikirkbya guadalupensis	Sp. nov	Valid	Crasquin in Tarnac et al.	Permian (Roadian)	Cutoff Formation	United States (Texas)	A member of Palaeocopida belonging to the family Kirkbyidae.	
Aurila agathae	Sp. nov	Valid	Sciuto, Temani & Ammar	Miocene (Messinian)		Tunisia	A member of the family Hemicytheridae.	
Aurila bassiounii	Sp. nov	Valid	Sciuto & Reitano	Early Pliocene		Italy		
Aurila burolleti	Sp. nov	Valid	Sciuto, Temani & Ammar	Miocene (Messinian)		Tunisia		
Aurila castanyi	Sp. nov	Valid	Sciuto, Temani & Ammar	Miocene (Messinian)		Tunisia		
Aurila dipattii	Sp. nov	Valid	Sciuto & Reitano	Early Pliocene		Italy		
Aurila doruki	Sp. nov	Valid	Sciuto, Temani & Ammar	Miocene (Messinian)		Tunisia		
Aurila nocellae	Sp. nov	Valid	Sciuto & Reitano	Early Pliocene		Italy		
Aurila violai	Sp. nov	Valid	Sciuto & Reitano	Early Pliocene		Italy		
Aurila zargounii	Sp. nov	Valid	Sciuto, Temani & Ammar	Miocene (Messinian)		Tunisia		
Bairdia elcapitanensis	Sp. nov	Valid	Crasquin in Tarnac et al.	Permian (Roadian)	Cutoff Formation	United States (Texas)	A member of the family Bairdiidae.	
Baschkirina tesakovae	Sp. nov	Valid	Melnikova et al.	Silurian	Syadai Formation	Russia		
Bythoceratina antetumida	Nom. nov	Valid	Slipper	Late Cretaceous (Turonian)		United Kingdom		
Callistocythere sissinghi	Sp. nov	Valid	Sciuto, Temani & Ammar	Miocene (Messinian)		Tunisia		
Candona dawenkouensis	Sp. nov	In press	Wang et al.	Middle Eocene to Oligocene	Dawenkou Formation	China	A species of Candona.	
Candona phaseolus	Sp. nov	In press	Kshetrimayum et al.	Late Cretaceous (Maastrichtian)		India	A species of Candona.	
Capsacythere narjessae	Sp. nov	Valid	Sciuto & Reitano	Early Pliocene		Italy		
Carinocythereis carboneli	Sp. nov	Valid	Sciuto, Temani & Ammar	Miocene (Messinian)		Tunisia	A member of the family Trachyleberididae.	
Cavellina septima	Sp. nov	Valid	Jones, Kelman & Laurie	Carboniferous (Mississippian)		Australia		
Ceratobairdia mescaleroella	Sp. nov	Valid	Forel in Tarnac et al.	Permian (Capitanian)	Bell Canyon Formation	United States (Texas)	A member of the family Bairdiidae.	
Ceratobairdia pratti	Sp. nov	Valid	Forel in Tarnac et al.	Permian (Roadian)	Cutoff Formation	United States (Texas)	A member of the family Bairdiidae.	
Ceratobairdia sexagintaduella	Sp. nov	Valid	Forel in Tarnac et al.	Permian (Roadian)	Cutoff Formation	United States (Texas)	A member of the family Bairdiidae.	
Chrysocythere nevianii	Sp. nov	Valid	Sciuto, Temani & Ammar	Miocene (Messinian)		Tunisia		
Cimbaurila mariellae	Sp. nov	Valid	Sciuto, Temani & Ammar	Miocene (Messinian)		Tunisia		
Cistacythereis merzeraudi	Sp. nov	Valid	Sciuto, Temani & Ammar	Miocene (Messinian)		Tunisia		
Cistacythereis purii	Sp. nov	Valid	Sciuto, Temani & Ammar	Miocene (Messinian)		Tunisia		
Cypridea khandae	Sp. nov	In press	Choi et al.	Early Cretaceous (Albian)	Jinju Formation	South Korea		
Cytherelloidea alexanderi	Sp. nov	Valid	Sciuto & Reitano	Early Pliocene		Italy		
Cytherelloidea ardita	Sp. nov	Valid	Sciuto & Reitano	Early Pliocene		Italy		
Cytherelloidea slipperi	Sp. nov	Valid	Sciuto & Reitano	Early Pliocene		Italy		
Cytherelloidea temaniae	Sp. nov	Valid	Sciuto & Reitano	Early Pliocene		Italy		
Cytheridea jonesi	Sp. nov	Valid	Sciuto, Temani & Ammar	Miocene (Messinian)		Tunisia		
Cytheridea münsteri	Sp. nov	Valid	Sciuto, Temani & Ammar	Miocene (Messinian)		Tunisia		
Cytheropterina crassicostata	Sp. nov	Valid	Wannenmacher et al.	Middle Jurassic (Aalenian)	Achdorf Formation	Germany	A member of the family Cytheruridae.	
Cytheropteron laranjeirensis	Sp. nov	In press	Vázquez García et al.	Cretaceous (Albian–Cenomanian)	Riachuelo Formation	Brazil		
Denticupachydomella bellcanyonensis	Sp. nov	Valid	Crasquin in Tarnac et al.	Permian (Capitanian)	Bell Canyon Formation	United States (Texas)	A member of Podocopida belonging to the family Microcheilinellidae.	
Echinocythereis clavata	Sp. nov	Valid	Sciuto & Reitano	Early Pliocene		Italy		
Echinocythereis multituberculata	Sp. nov	Valid	Sciuto & Reitano	Early Pliocene		Italy		
Eucytherura eberti	Sp. nov	Valid	Wannenmacher et al.	Middle Jurassic (Aalenian)	Achdorf Formation	Germany	A member of the family Cytheruridae.	
Eucytherura fossapunctata	Sp. nov	In press	Maia et al.	Late Pleistocene		Brazil		
Eucytherura foveolata	Sp. nov	Valid	Wannenmacher et al.	Middle Jurassic (Aalenian)	Opalinuston Formation	Germany	A member of the family Cytheruridae.	
Eucytherura regina	Sp. nov	Valid	Sciuto & Reitano	Early Pliocene		Italy		
Eurybolbina uralica	Sp. nov	Valid	Melnikova et al.	Silurian	Syadai Formation	Russia		
Evlanella? conversa	Sp. nov	Valid	Jones, Kelman & Laurie	Carboniferous (Mississippian)	Bonaparte Basin	Australia		
Geisina culbersonensis	Sp. nov	Valid	Crasquin in Tarnac et al.	Permian (Roadian)	Cutoff Formation	United States (Texas)	A member of Palaeocopida belonging to the family Geisinidae.	
Glyptolichvinella acrista	Sp. nov	Valid	Jones, Kelman & Laurie	Carboniferous (Mississippian)		Australia		
Gomphocythere testudo	Sp. nov	In press	Kshetrimayum et al.	Late Cretaceous (Maastrichtian)		India		
Healdia cutoffella	Sp. nov	Valid	Crasquin in Tarnac et al.	Permian (Roadian)	Cutoff Formation	United States (Texas)	A member of Podocopa belonging to the family Healdiidae.	
Healdia mckittrickensis	Sp. nov	Valid	Crasquin in Tarnac et al.	Permian (Roadian to Capitanian)	Bell Canyon Formation	United States (Texas)	A member of Podocopa belonging to the family Healdiidae.	
Healdia veeversi	Sp. nov	Valid	Jones, Kelman & Laurie	Carboniferous (Mississippian)	Bonaparte Basin	Australia		
Healdiacypris drucei	Sp. nov	Valid	Jones, Kelman & Laurie	Carboniferous (Mississippian)	Bonaparte Basin	Australia		
Healdianella ogmoconchelloides	Sp. nov	Valid	Jones, Kelman & Laurie	Carboniferous (Mississippian)	Bonaparte Basin	Australia		
Hollinella locula	Sp. nov	In press	Forel in Forel, Poulet-Crovisier & Korat	Late Permian and Early Triassic	Daye Formation; Feixianguan Formation; Kayitou Formation; Longtan Formation; Xuanwei Formation	China	A member of Palaeocopida.	
Hollinella williamsranchensis	Sp. nov	Valid	Crasquin in Tarnac et al.	Permian (Roadian to Capitanian)	Bell Canyon Formation	United States (Texas)	A member of Palaeocopida belonging to the family Hollinellidae.	
Idiocythere caburnensis	Sp. nov	Valid	Slipper	Late Cretaceous (Turonian)		United Kingdom		
Isocythereis postelongata	Sp. nov	Valid	Slipper	Late Cretaceous (Turonian)		United Kingdom		
Jenningsina guilinensis	Sp. nov	In press	Song et al.	Late Devonian		China		
Karsteneis oculocosta	Sp. nov	Valid	Slipper	Late Cretaceous (Turonian)		United Kingdom		
Mauritsina? paradordoniensis	Sp. nov	Valid	Slipper	Late Cretaceous (Turonian)		United Kingdom		
Mediocytherideis hornei	Sp. nov	Valid	Sciuto, Temani & Ammar	Miocene (Messinian)		Tunisia		
Microxestoleberis riachuelensis	Sp. nov	In press	Vázquez García et al.	Cretaceous (Albian–Cenomanian)	Riachuelo Formation	Brazil		
Monoceratina minangulata	Sp. nov	Valid	Slipper	Late Cretaceous (Turonian)		United Kingdom		
Neomonoceratina lajmii	Sp. nov	Valid	Sciuto, Temani & Ammar	Miocene (Messinian)		Tunisia		
Neomonoceratina morkhoweni	Sp. nov	Valid	Sciuto, Temani & Ammar	Miocene (Messinian)		Tunisia		
Neomonoceratina mostafawii	Sp. nov	Valid	Sciuto, Temani & Ammar	Miocene (Messinian)		Tunisia		
Neomonoceratina reussi	Sp. nov	Valid	Sciuto, Temani & Ammar	Miocene (Messinian)		Tunisia		
Okadaleberis azouzi	Sp. nov	Valid	Sciuto, Temani & Ammar	Miocene (Messinian)		Tunisia		
Pachycaudites yassinii	Sp. nov	Valid	Sciuto & Reitano	Early Pliocene		Italy		
Paracavellina olempskae	Sp. nov	Valid	Jones, Kelman & Laurie	Carboniferous (Mississippian)	Bonaparte Basin	Australia		
Parahemingwayela fauthi	Sp. nov	In press	Vázquez García et al.	Cretaceous (Albian–Cenomanian)	Riachuelo Formation	Brazil		
Paraparchites pecosensis	Sp. nov	Valid	Crasquin in Tarnac et al.	Permian (Roadian to Capitanian)	Cutoff Formation	United States (Texas)	A member of Podocopa belonging to the family Paraparchitidae.	
Patellacythere weaveri	Sp. nov	Valid	Slipper	Late Cretaceous (Turonian)		United Kingdom		
Peteraurila carbonneli	Sp. nov	Valid	Sciuto, Temani & Ammar	Miocene (Messinian)		Tunisia		
Peteraurila moisettei	Sp. nov	Valid	Sciuto, Temani & Ammar	Miocene (Messinian)		Tunisia		
Peteraurila nachitei	Sp. nov	Valid	Sciuto, Temani & Ammar	Miocene (Messinian)		Tunisia		
Peteraurila ulicznyi	Sp. nov	Valid	Sciuto, Temani & Ammar	Miocene (Messinian)		Tunisia		
Pleurocythere khapissovi	Sp. nov	Valid	Glinskikh & Tesakova	Middle Jurassic (Callovian)		Russia		
Plumhoffia curvicosta	Sp. nov	Valid	Ohmert & Franz	Middle Jurassic	Ostreenkalk Formation	Germany	A member of the family Cytheruridae.	
Polycope lazarusi	Sp. nov	Valid	Forel in Forel & Grădinaru	Triassic		Romania	A member of the family Polycopidae.	
Polycope legio	Sp. nov	Valid	Forel in Forel & Grădinaru	Triassic		Romania	A member of the family Polycopidae.	
Polycope ludwigi	Sp. nov	Valid	Forel in Forel & Grădinaru	Triassic		Romania	A member of the family Polycopidae.	
Pontopolycope jeanlouisi	Sp. nov	Valid	Forel in Forel & Grădinaru	Triassic		Romania	A member of the family Polycopidae.	
Pontopolycope papai	Sp. nov	Valid	Forel in Forel & Grădinaru	Triassic		Romania	A member of the family Polycopidae.	
?Praeschuleridea plana	Sp. nov	Valid	Ohmert & Franz	Middle Jurassic	Ostreenkalk Formation	Germany	A member of the family Schulerideidae.	
Pseudocytherura carolinae	Sp. nov	Valid	Sciuto & Reitano	Early Pliocene		Italy		
Pseudomutilus	Gen. et sp. nov	Valid	Sciuto in Sciuto & Benkhedda	Miocene (Tortonian)		Algeria	A member of the family Trachyleberididae. The type species is P. benkheddai.	
Pterygocythereis carolinae	Sp. nov	Valid	Slipper	Late Cretaceous (Turonian)		United Kingdom		
Quasiagrenocythere	Gen. et sp. nov	Valid	Sciuto in Sciuto & Benkhedda	Miocene (Tortonian)		Algeria	A member of the family Trachyleberididae. The type species is Q. tevestaensis.	
Quasihermanites? punctata	Sp. nov	In press	Vázquez García et al.	Cretaceous (Albian–Cenomanian)	Riachuelo Formation	Brazil		
Rehacythereis stellatus	Sp. nov	Valid	Slipper	Late Cretaceous (Turonian)		United Kingdom		
Reversocypris australis	Sp. nov	Valid	Jones, Kelman & Laurie	Carboniferous (Mississippian)	Bonaparte Basin	Australia		
Schuleridea langdonensis	Sp. nov	Valid	Slipper	Late Cretaceous (Turonian)		United Kingdom		
Syadaikinia	Gen. et sp. nov	Valid	Melnikova et al.	Silurian	Syadai Formation	Russia	The type species is S. tumidosa.	
Tenedocythere uffenordei	Sp. nov	Valid	Sciuto & Reitano	Early Pliocene		Italy		
Tschigovana thomasi	Sp. nov	Valid	Jones, Kelman & Laurie	Carboniferous (Mississippian)		Australia		
Urocythere (Pokornyella) bremani	Sp. nov	Valid	Sciuto, Temani & Ammar	Miocene (Messinian)		Tunisia		

==== Other crustaceans ====
Name	Novelty	Status	Authors	Age	Type locality	Country	Notes	Images
Carapacestheria? lulworthensis	Sp. nov	In press	Li, Teng & Wimbledon	Late Jurassic/Early Cretaceous	Purbeck Group	United Kingdom	A clam shrimp.	
Chelonibia zanzibarensis	Sp. nov	In press	Collareta & Newman in Collareta et al.	Miocene	Chake-Chake beds	Tanzania	A barnacle, a species of Chelonibia.	
Concinnalepas bessinensis	Sp. nov	In press	Gale	Middle Jurassic (Bathonian)		France	A barnacle.	
Concinnalepas rugosa	Sp. nov	In press	Gale	Late Jurassic (Tithonian)	Kimmeridge Clay	United Kingdom	A barnacle.	
Cornia cheni	Sp. nov	Valid	Liao & Shen	Early Devonian		China	A clam shrimp.	
Gibbosaverruca milazzoensis	Sp. nov	Valid	Gale	Plio-Pleistocene		Italy	A barnacle.	
Malayacyclus	Gen. et sp. nov	Valid	Tang, Mychko, Feldmann & Schweitzer in Tang et al.	Carboniferous (Viséan)		Malaysia	A member of Cyclida. Genus includes new species M. terengganuensis. Announced in 2021; validated in 2023.	
Palaeolimnadiopsis zhangi	Sp. nov	Valid	Liao & Shen	Early Devonian		China	A clam shrimp.	
Solidobalanus digeronimoi	Sp. nov	Valid	Gale	Plio-Pleistocene		Italy	A barnacle.	

=== Research ===
- A study on the anatomy and phylogenetic relationships of the species "Penaeus" natator from the Santonian of Lebanon is published by Audo, Winkler & Charbonnier (2021), who interpret this species as a relative of Pseudodrobna kenngotti from the Late Jurassic of Germany, and transfer it to the genus Pseudodrobna
- A study on the anatomy and morphological variation in Beurlenia araripensis, based on data from fossil samples from the Crato Formation (Brazil), is published by Barros et al. (2021).
- A study on the anatomy of the eyes of Callichimaera perplexa, and on their growth during the ontogeny of this crab, is published by Jenkins, Briggs & Luque (2021).
- A study on the anatomy and phylogenetic relationships of Oxyuropoda is published by Robin et al. (2021), who interpret this arthropod as the oldest known member of the crown group of Peracarida.
- Fossil evidence of early colonization of estuarine settings by ostracods is reported from the Silurian Si Ka Formation (Vietnam) by McGairy et al. (2021)
- A study on evolutionary trends in sexual dimorphism of cytheroid ostracods from the Gulf and Atlantic coastal plain from the Late Cretaceous to the late Eocene is published by Matzke-Karasz & Smith (2021).

== Radiodonts ==
=== New taxa ===
Name	Novelty	Status	Authors	Age	Type locality	Country	Notes	Images
Buccaspinea	Gen. et sp. nov	Valid	Pates et al.	Cambrian (Drumian)	Marjum Formation	United States (Utah)	A hurdiid radiodont. The type species is B. cooperi.	
Houcaris	Gen. et comb. nov	Valid	Wu et al.	Cambrian Series 2	Carrara Formation; Maotianshan Shales; Pioche Formation	China; United States	A tamisiocaridid radiodont. Type species "Anomalocaris" saron (1995); Also includes "Anomalocaris" magnabasis (2019).	Houcaris saron
Lenisicaris	Gen. et sp. et comb. nov	In press	Wu et al.	Cambrian		China; United States	An anomalocaridid radiodont. Type species L. lupata, L. pennsylvanica moved from "Anomalocaris" pennsylvanica (1929).	Lenisicaris lupata
Paranomalocaris simplex	Sp. nov	Valid	Jiao et al.	Cambrian Stage 4	Wulongqing Formation	China	An anomalocaridid radiodont.	
Titanokorys	Gen. et sp. nov	Valid	Caron & Moysiuk	Cambrian (Wuliuan)	Burgess Shale	Canada (British Columbia)	A hurdiid radiodont. The type species is T. gainesi.	

=== Research ===
- A study on the morphologies of frontal appendages and probable modes of feeding of radiodonts from the Burgess Shale is published by De Vivo, Lautenschlager & Vinther (2021).

== Trilobites ==
=== New taxa ===
Name	Novelty	Status	Authors	Age	Type locality	Location	Notes	Images
Acuticryphops prorotundus	Sp. nov	In press	Feist & Klapper	Devonian (Frasnian)		France	A member of the family Phacopidae.	
Acutiphacops	Gen. et 2 sp. et comb. nov	In press	Feist & Klapper	Late Devonian		France; Morocco	A member of the family Phacopidae. The type species is A. medius; genus also includes new species A. tchrafinensis, as well as "Phacops" erfoudensis Richter & Richter (1943).	
Ampulliglabella arakii	Sp. nov	Valid	Flick & Shiino	Permian (probably Wordian)	Hoso-o Formation	Japan		
Anadesma	Gen. et comb. nov	Valid	Holloway	Silurian (late Aeronian to early Telychian)		Canada	A member of Lichida belonging to the family Lichidae; a new genus for "Amphilichas" shallopensis Twenhofel (1928).	
Arctinurus aorter	Sp. nov	Valid	Holloway	Silurian		United States	A member of Lichida belonging to the family Lichidae.	
Asioptychaspis lata	Sp. nov	In press	Wernette et al.	Cambrian (Furongian)	Myet-Ye Formation	Myanmar		
Belenopyge bellerophon	Sp. nov	Valid	Flick	Devonian	Greifenstein Limestone	Germany		
Bollandia reviviscens	Sp. nov	Valid	Gandl	Carboniferous		Spain	A member of the family Phillipsiidae belonging to the subfamily Bollandiinae.	
Brachymetopus (Acutimetopus) laticeps	Sp. nov	Valid	Gandl	Carboniferous		Spain	A member of the family Brachymetopidae belonging to the subfamily Brachymetopinae.	
Celadiella	Gen. et sp. nov	Valid	Gandl	Carboniferous		Spain	A member of the family Phillipsiidae belonging to the subfamily Ditomopyginae. Genus includes new species C. celadensis.	
Cheiropyge radula	Sp. nov	Valid	Flick & Shiino	Permian (probably Wordian)	Hoso-o Formation	Japan		
Chlupacops angularis	Sp. nov	In press	Feist & Klapper	Devonian (Frasnian)		France	A member of the family Phacopidae.	
Chlupacops clapassousensis	Sp. nov	In press	Feist & Klapper	Devonian (Frasnian)		France	A member of the family Phacopidae.	
Chlupacops migrans	Sp. nov	In press	Feist & Klapper	Devonian (Frasnian)	Serre Formation	France	A member of the family Phacopidae.	
Chlupacops narbonnensis	Sp. nov	In press	Feist & Klapper	Devonian (Frasnian)		France	A member of the family Phacopidae.	
Chlupacops rectannulatus	Sp. nov	In press	Feist & Klapper	Devonian (Frasnian)	Serre Formation	France	A member of the family Phacopidae.	
Chotecops morrisoni	Sp. nov	Valid	Flick	Devonian	Günterod Limestone	Germany		
Cinerana	Gen. et sp. nov	Valid	Gandl	Carboniferous		Spain	Possibly a member of the family Phillipsiidae. Genus includes new species C. matallanensis.	
Cronierella	Gen. et 3 sp. et comb. nov	In press	Feist & Klapper	Late Devonian	Serre Formation	France; Poland	A member of the family Phacopidae. The type species is C. gallica; genus also includes new species C. postera and C. expansa, as well as "Phacops" zofiae Chlupáč (1993).	
Ctenopyge magna	Sp. nov	Valid	Nielsen & Andersen	Cambrian (Furongian)	Alum Shale Formation	Denmark	A member of the family Olenidae.	
Cydonocephalus tiffanyae	Sp. nov	Valid	Adrain & Pérez-Peris	Ordovician (Darriwilian)	Table Cove Formation	Canada (Newfoundland and Labrador)	A member of Acanthoparyphinae.	
Diacanthaspis tricosa	Sp. nov	Valid	Holloway	Silurian		United States	A member of the family Odontopleuridae.	
Dicranopeltis eretes	Sp. nov	Valid	Holloway	Silurian		United States	A member of Lichida belonging to the family Lichidae.	
Dicranopeltis kallaion	Sp. nov	Valid	Holloway	Silurian		United States	A member of Lichida belonging to the family Lichidae.	
Ditomopyge benkei	Sp. nov	Valid	Flick & Shiino	Permian (probably Wordian)	Hoso-o Formation	Japan		
Ditomopyge (Carniphillipsia) cantamudensis	Sp. nov	Valid	Gandl	Carboniferous		Spain	A member of the family Phillipsiidae belonging to the subfamily Ditomopyginae.	
Ditomopyge (Carniphillipsia) castelleriae	Sp. nov	Valid	Gandl	Carboniferous		Spain	A member of the family Phillipsiidae belonging to the subfamily Ditomopyginae.	
Dohmiella pachyacanthophilia	Sp. nov	Valid	Van Viersen	Devonian (Emsian)		Spain		
Dohmiella pooka	Sp. nov	Valid	Van Viersen	Devonian (Eifelian)		Belgium		
Eccaparadoxides epimetheus	Sp. nov	In press	Geyer, Landing & Żylińska	Cambrian (Miaolingian)	Jbel Wawrmast Formation	Morocco	A member of the family Paradoxididae.	
Eccaparadoxides? hestia	Sp. nov	In press	Geyer, Landing & Żylińska	Cambrian (Miaolingian)	Jbel Wawrmast Formation	Morocco	A member of the family Paradoxididae.	
Eccaparadoxides zelus	Sp. nov	In press	Geyer, Landing & Żylińska	Cambrian (Miaolingian)	Delitzsch Formation	Germany	A member of the family Paradoxididae.	
Ehmaniella tupeqarfik	Sp. nov	Valid	Peel	Cambrian (Wuliuan)	Telt Bugt Formation	Greenland	A member of the family Alokistocaridae.	
Eisarkaspis jonesi	Sp. nov	Valid	Smith & Laurie	Ordovician (Darriwilian)		Australia		
Eldoradia caerulioris	Sp. nov	Valid	Peel	Cambrian (Guzhangian)	Blue Cliffs Formation	Greenland	A member of the family Bolaspididae.	
Fieldaspis? iubilaei	Sp. nov	Valid	Peel	Cambrian (Wuliuan)	Telt Bugt Formation	Greenland	A member of the family Zacanthoididae.	
Gerastos cornix	Sp. nov	Valid	Van Viersen	Devonian (Eifelian)		Belgium		
Ghanaspis	Gen. et sp. nov	Valid	Smith & Laurie	Ordovician (Darriwilian)		Australia	Genus includes new species G. ritchiei.	
Girardina	Gen. et 2 sp. nov	In press	Feist & Klapper	Devonian (Frasnian)		France; Germany	A member of the family Phacopidae. The type species is G. konradbartzschi; genus also includes new species G. consimilis, and possibly also "Phacops" liopyga Richter (1863).	
Gonioteloides moffitti	Sp. nov	Valid	Adrain & Karim	Ordovician (Tremadocian)		United States	Possibly a member of the family Dimeropygidae.	
Gonioteloides pankowskii	Sp. nov	Valid	Adrain & Karim	Ordovician (Tremadocian)		United States	Possibly a member of the family Dimeropygidae.	
Griffithides inexpectatus	Sp. nov	Valid	Gandl	Carboniferous		Spain	A member of the family Phillipsiidae belonging to the subfamily Griffithidinae.	
Harebayaspis	Gen. et sp. nov	Valid	Adrain & Pérez-Peris	Ordovician (Darriwilian)	Table Cove Formation	Canada (Newfoundland and Labrador)	A member of Pilekiinae. The type species is H. plurima.	
Illaenus taoyuanensis	Sp. nov	Valid	Wei et al.	Ordovician (Darriwilian)		China		
Iridis	Gen. et sp. nov	Valid	Smith & Laurie	Ordovician (Darriwilian)		Australia	Genus includes new species I. schoonorum.	
Kaotaia xuanensis	Sp. nov	In press	Hughes et al.	Cambrian (Miaolingian)		Vietnam		
Kawina stougei	Sp. nov	Valid	Adrain & Pérez-Peris	Ordovician (Darriwilian)	Table Cove Formation	Canada (Newfoundland and Labrador)	A member of Acanthoparyphinae.	
Koneprusia dongesi	Sp. nov	Valid	Alberti & Müller	Devonian (Emsian)	Rupbach Shales	Germany	A member of the family Odontopleuridae.	
Koneprusites amicalis	Sp. nov	Valid	Flick	Devonian	Günterod Limestone	Germany		
Koneprusites cervisiaemontis	Sp. nov	Valid	Flick	Devonian	Günterod Limestone	Germany		
Leonaspis glaux	Sp. nov	Valid	Flick & Flick	Devonian (Emsian)	Ballersbach Limestone	Germany	A member of the family Odontopleuridae.	
Lycophron titan	Sp. nov	Valid	Smith & Laurie	Ordovician (Darriwilian)		Australia		
Mainbrookia	Gen. et sp. nov	Valid	Adrain & Pérez-Peris	Ordovician (Darriwilian)	Table Cove Formation	Canada (Newfoundland and Labrador)	A member of Deiphoninae. The type species is M. becki.	
Mioptychopyge chengkouensis	Sp. nov	Valid	Wei et al.	Ordovician	Houping Formation	China		
Miraspis capnica	Sp. nov	Valid	Holloway	Silurian		United States	A member of the family Odontopleuridae.	
Morocops richterorum	Sp. nov	Valid	Flick	Devonian	Greifenstein Limestone	Germany	A member of the family Phacopidae.	
Namuropyge alfredi	Sp. nov	Valid	Müller, Hahn & Paul	Carboniferous (Viséan)		Germany	A member of the family Brachymetopidae.	
Namuropyge brooksi	Sp. nov	Valid	Müller, Hahn & Paul	Carboniferous (Mississippian)	Cuyahoga Formation	United States (Ohio)	A member of the family Brachymetopidae.	
Namuropyge ulrichi	Sp. nov	Valid	Müller, Hahn & Paul	Carboniferous (Viséan)		Germany	A member of the family Brachymetopidae.	
Neogriffithides extremorientalis	Sp. nov	Valid	Flick & Shiino	Permian (probably Wordian)	Hoso-o Formation	Japan		
Newfoundlandops	Gen. et sp. nov	Valid	Adrain & Pérez-Peris	Ordovician (Darriwilian)	Table Cove Formation	Canada (Newfoundland and Labrador)	Possibly a member of Sphaerexochinae. The type species is N. karimae.	
Nganasanella australica	Sp. nov	Valid	Makarova	Cambrian		Australia; Russia?	A member of the family Aphelaspididae.	
Nileus yichongqiaoensis	Sp. nov	Valid	Wei et al.	Ordovician (Darriwilian)		China		
Norasaphus (Norasaphus) patersoni	Sp. nov	Valid	Smith & Laurie	Ordovician (Darriwilian)		Australia		
Nyterops fugax	Sp. nov	Valid	Van Viersen & Koppka	Devonian (Givetian)	Hanonet Formation	Belgium	A member of the family Phacopidae.	
Nyterops gerolsteinensis	Sp. nov	Valid	Van Viersen & Koppka	Devonian (Eifelian?)		Germany	A member of the family Phacopidae.	
Occitanella	Gen. et 2 sp. nov	In press	Feist & Klapper	Devonian (Frasnian)		France; Australia?	A member of the family Phacopidae. The type species is O. hexagonalis; genus also includes new species O. postinflexa, and possibly also "Trimerocephaloides" linguiformis Feist et al. (2009).	
Octobronteus? incertus	Sp. nov	Valid	Holloway	Silurian		United States	A member of the family Scutelluidae.	
Octobronteus? ormistoni	Sp. nov	Valid	Holloway	Silurian		United States	A member of the family Scutelluidae.	
Octobronteus? petasus	Sp. nov	Valid	Holloway	Silurian		United States	A member of the family Scutelluidae.	
Panderia striolatus	Sp. nov	Valid	Wei et al.	Ordovician (Darriwilian)		China		
Paratiresias peculiaris	Sp. nov	Valid	Wei et al.	Ordovician (Darriwilian)		China		
Pedinopariops apsconditus	Sp. nov	Valid	Van Viersen & Koppka	Devonian (Eifelian)	Jemelle Formation	Belgium	A member of the family Phacopidae.	
Planiscutellum apollo	Sp. nov	Valid	Holloway	Silurian (Aeronian)		Canada	A member of the family Scutelluidae.	
Pseudohelmutia	Gen. et sp. nov	Valid	Basse & Müller	Early Devonian		Germany	A member of the subfamily Proetinae. Genus includes new species P. feisti.	
Rupbachella	Gen. et sp. nov	Disputed	Alberti	Devonian (Emsian)	Rupbach Shale	Germany	A member of the family Odontopleuridae. The type species is R. paedomorpha. Van Viersen (2024) considered R. paedomorpha to be a junior synonym of Leonaspis kleini.	
Sinagnostus	Gen. et sp. nov	Valid	Wei et al.	Ordovician (Darriwilian)		China	Genus includes new species S. mirabilis.	
Solenoparia changi	Sp. nov	Valid	Sun, Bentley & Laurie	Cambrian (Guzhangian)	Warburton Basin	Australia		
Timsaloproetus alissae	Sp. nov	Valid	Van Viersen & Lerouge	Devonian (Emsian)		Morocco	A member of the family Proetidae.	
Trochurus searcyensis	Sp. nov	Valid	Holloway	Silurian		United States	A member of Lichida belonging to the family Lichidae.	
Unguliproetus chamaeleo	Sp. nov	Valid	Flick	Devonian	Ballersbach Limestone	Germany		
Unguliproetus fredknoppi	Sp. nov	Valid	Basse & Müller	Early Devonian		Germany	A member of the subfamily Proetinae.	
Valberzosa	Gen. et sp. nov	Valid	Gandl	Carboniferous		Spain	A member of the family Phillipsiidae belonging to the subfamily Bollandiinae. Genus includes new species V. rara.	
Waideggula (Camasobrina) verdenensis	Sp. nov	Valid	Gandl	Carboniferous		Spain	A member of the family Phillipsiidae belonging to the subfamily Ditomopyginae.	
Waideggula (Waideggula) cantabrica tabardina	Ssp. nov	Valid	Gandl	Carboniferous		Spain	A member of the family Phillipsiidae belonging to the subfamily Ditomopyginae.	
Waideggula (Waideggula) pedregalensis	Sp. nov	Valid	Gandl	Carboniferous		Spain	A member of the family Phillipsiidae belonging to the subfamily Ditomopyginae.	
Weania insulana	Sp. nov	Valid	Flick & Shiino	Permian (probably Wordian)	Hoso-o Formation	Japan		
Yanpingia	Gen. et sp. nov	Valid	Wei et al.	Ordovician (Darriwilian)		China	Genus includes new species Y. punctata.	

=== Research ===
- A study on middle–late Cambrian trilobite diversity patterns in South China is published by Zhang et al. (2021).
- Sun, Zeng & Zhao (2021) describe digestive structures of representatives of five trilobite genera from the Cambrian Mantou Formation and Zhangxia Formation (Liaoning, China).
- Hou, Hughes & Hopkins (2021) report structural details of the upper limb branch of Triarthrus eatoni and Olenoides serratus, and interpret their findings as indicating that the upper limb branch of trilobites served a respiratory function.
- A study on the morphology of Redlichia rex and Olenoides serratus, aiming to determine whether these trilobites were adapted for durophagy, is published by Bicknell et al. (2021).
- A study exploring the existence and the nature of growth gradients along the main body axis of Oryctocarella duyunensis is published by Dai et al (2021), who interpret O. duyunensis as the first trilobite with documented determinate growth.
- Description of all meraspid stages of Oryctocarella duyunensis, based on data from specimens from the Cambrian Balang Formation (Hunan, South China), is published by Dai et al. (2021).
- A study on the ontogenic moulting sequence of Arthricocephalites xinzhaiheensis, based on data from specimens from the Balang Formation, is published by Wang et al. (2021).
- A study on post-embryonic axial growth in Estaingia bilobata is published by Holmes, Paterson & García-Bellido (2021).
- A study on the functional performance of Placoparia cambriensis in water is published by Esteve et al. (2021), who interpret their findings as indicating that this trilobite was not able to swim, but it was capable of hopping locomotion, and it might represent a transitional form between benthic animals without swimming skills and animals able to swim near the benthos.
- A study on the phylogenetic relationships within Harpetida, and on the impact of the Ordovician–Silurian extinction events on this group, is published by Beech & Lamsdell (2021).
- The first known Silurian trilobite specimen preserved with soft parts reported to date (a specimen of Dalmanites preserved with appendages and alimentary system) is described from the Herefordshire Lagerstätte (United Kingdom) by Siveter et al. (2021).
- A study on the long-term evolutionary history of Devonian trilobites in North Africa is published by Bault et al. (2021).
- A study on the hydrodynamics of queuing behaviour in Trimerocephalus chopini is published by Song et al. (2021).
- Evidence from trace and body fossils indicative of the presence of trilobites in brackish-water settings is presented by Mángano et al. (2021).
- A study on the chemical changes in the exoskeleton of trilobites induced by diagenesis, based on data from pygidia of Athabaskia anax from the Miaolingian of San Isidro (Argentina), is published by D'Angelo et al. (2021), is published by D'Angelo et al. (2021), who argue that some morphological characteristics of the trilobite pygidia are in fact results of chemical and structural changes taking place during fossilization, and evaluate possible systematic implications of the chemical data, advising caution when using morphological characteristics of the exoskeletons to establish new taxa.
- The study on the internal structures of eyes of trilobites belonging to the genera Asaphus and Archegonus published by Scholtz, Staude & Dunlop (2019) is criticized by Schoenemann & Clarkson (2021).
- A study on the biomechanics of the trilobite cephalon is published by Esteve et al. (2021), who interpret their findings as indicating that in the sutured trilobites the cephalon was able to withstand greater stresses than in their non-sutured counterparts, and argue that the ability to withstand greater burrowing loads enabled trilobites to successfully invade bioturbated and more consolidated sediments during the Cambrian substrate revolution.
- A study on the compound eyes of trilobites belonging to the group Phacopina is published by Schoenemann et al. (2021), who interpret their findings as indicating that these trilobites had hyper-compound eyes hiding an individual compound eye below each of the big lenses, resulting in each of the compound eyes comprising tens or hundreds of small compound eye systems.
- A study on the systematics of Devonian trochurine trilobites is published by Van Viersen (2021).

== Other arthropods ==
=== New taxa ===
Name	Novelty	Status	Authors	Age	Type locality	Location	Notes	Images
Attenborolimulus	Gen. et sp. nov	Valid	Bicknell & Shcherbakov	Early Triassic (Olenekian)	Petropavlovka Formation	Russia (Orenburg Oblast)	A member of Xiphosura belonging to the family Austrolimulidae. The type species is A. superspinosus.	
Bailongia	Gen. et sp. nov	In press	Jiao et al.	Cambrian Stage 4	Wulongqing Formation	China	A non-trilobite artiopod. The type species is B. longicaudata.	
Bohemiacaris	Gen. et sp. nov	Valid	Van Roy et al.	Ordovician (Sandbian)	Letná Formation	Czech Republic	A member of Thylacocephala. Genus includes new species B. libori.	
Caudicaella	Gen. et comb. nov	Valid	Sun et al.	Cambrian Stage 3	Shuijingtuo Formation	China	A bivalved arthropod belonging to the family Sunellidae. The type species is "Sunella" bispinata Cui & Huo (1990).	
Duplapex	Gen. et sp. nov	In press	Ma et al.	Cambrian Stage 3		China	A bivalved arthropod related to Tuzoia. Genus includes new species D. anima.	
Electrocambala	Gen. et 2 sp. nov	Valid	Moritz & Wesener	Cretaceous	Burmese amber	Myanmar	A millipede belonging to the order Spirostreptida and the suborder Cambalidea. The type species is E. ornata; genus also includes E. cretacea.	
Eodollocaris	Gen. et sp. nov	Valid	Laville, Haug & Haug	Carboniferous (middle Pennsylvanian)	Mazon Creek fossil beds	United States (Illinois)	A member of Thylacocephala. The type species is E. keithflinti.	
Franconiolimulus	Gen. et sp. nov	Valid	Bicknell, Hecker & Heyng	Early Jurassic (Hettangian)	Bayreuth Formation	Germany	A member of Xiphosura belonging to the family Austrolimulidae. Genus includes new species F. pochankei.	
Houia guangxiensis	Sp. nov	In press	Wang et al.	Early Devonian	Cangwu Formation	China		
Kachincambala	Gen. et 2 sp. nov	Valid	Moritz & Wesener	Cretaceous	Burmese amber	Myanmar	A millipede belonging to the order Spirostreptida and the suborder Cambalidea. The type species is K. muelleri; genus also includes K. distorta.	
Lihuacaris	Gen. et sp. nov		Jiao et al.	Cambrian Stage 4	Wulongqing Formation	China	A stem-group euarthropod of uncertain phylogenetic placement, with possible close affinities with either radiodonts or fuxianhuiids. The type species is L. ferox.	
Myrmecodesmus antiquus	Sp. nov	Valid	Riquelme & Hernández-Patricio in Riquelme, Hernández-Patricio & Álvarez-Rodríguez	Miocene	Mexican amber	Mexico	A millipede belonging to the family Pyrgodesmidae.	
Ostenolimulus	Gen. et sp. nov	Valid	Lamsdell et al.	Early Jurassic (Sinemurian)	Moltrasio Formation	Italy	A horseshoe crab. Genus includes new species O. latus.	
Pakucaris	Gen. et sp. nov	Valid	Izquierdo-López & Caron	Cambrian (Wuliuan)	Burgess Shale	Canada (British Columbia)	A stem mandibulate bivalved arthropod. Genus includes new species P. apatis.	
Pectocaris inopinata	Sp. nov	Valid	Jin et al.	Cambrian		China	A stem mandibulate bivalved arthropod.	
Pseudoprotozoea	Gen. et sp. nov	Valid	Van Roy et al.	Ordovician (Sandbian)	Letná Formation	Czech Republic	A member of Thylacocephala. Genus includes new species P. irenae.	
Terropterus	Gen. et sp. nov	Valid	Wang et al.	Silurian (Llandovery)	Xiushan Formation and Fentou Formation	China	A member of Eurypterida. Genus includes new species T. xiushanensis.	
?Woodwardopterus freemanorum	Sp. nov	In press	Poschmann & Rozefelds	Permian (Changhsingian)	Bowen Basin (Baralaba Coal Measures)	Australia	A member of Eurypterida.	

=== Research ===
- Lan et al. (2021) report exquisite preservation of bilaterally symmetric brain in leanchoiliid specimens from the Cambrian Kaili biota (China), and evaluate the implications of these fossils for the knowledge of the evolution of the central nervous system in arthropods.
- A study on carapace shape variation and hydrodynamic performance of members of the genus Isoxys is published by Pates et al. (2021), who argue that members of this genus occupied a variety of distinct niches in Cambrian oceans, and some were adapted for vertical movement in the water column.
- A study on the composition and microstructure of the carapace of Chuandianella ovata is published by Liu, Fu & Zhang (2021), who interpret their findings as indicating that this arthropod reinforced its carapace with phosphatic mineralization.
- A study on the post-embryonic development of Chuandianella ovata is published by Liu, Fu & Zhang (2021).
- Braddy & Dunlop (2021) argue that Parioscorpio venator was a cheloniellid-like arthropod with large raptorial appendages.
- New information on the anatomy of the head of Fuxianhuia is presented by Aria, Zhao & Zhu (2021), who interpret fuxianhuiids as mandibulates.
- Partial remains of a member of the genus Arthropleura, representing one of the largest arthropod fossils reported to date and providing new information on the exoskeleton of Arthropleura, are described from the Carboniferous (Serpukhovian) Stainmore Formation (Northumberland, England, United Kingdom) by Davies et al. (2021), who also evaluate the implications of this finding for the knowledge of arthropleurid habitat and factors that enabled the evolution of large body size in arthropleurids.
- Revision of the morphological diversity, relationships and taxonomy of Early Triassic thylacocephalans is published by Laville et al. (2021).
- Description of new fossil material of Mayrocaris bucculata from the Solnhofen Limestone, providing new information on the anatomy of this thylacocephalan, is published by Laville et al. (2021), who evaluate the implications of these fossils for the knowledge of the body organization and phylogenetic affinities of thylacocephalans.
- A study on the morphology and possible intraspecific variability of Sinoburius lunaris is published by Schmidt et al. (2021).
- A fossil larva lacking segmentation of the carapace, closely resembling the trilobite protaspis, is described from the Ordovician (Darriwilian) of central Siberia by Dzik (2021), found associated with other skeletal elements of the angarocaridid Girardevia; however, Lerosey-Aubril & Laibl (2021) subsequently interpret this specimen as actually belonging to the trilobite genus Isotelus or a related taxon, and conclude that protaspid larvae represent a developmental trait unique to trilobites.
- A study on the possible relationships between eurypterid morphology, the ease with which members of this group experienced ecdysis, and longevity of eurypterid species is published by Brandt (2021).
- A geometric morphometric analysis of data from eurypterine eurypterid specimens is presented by Bicknell & Amati (2021).
- Redescription of Leiopterella tetliei is published by Braddy, Dunlop & Bonsor (2021).
- Bicknell, Melzer & Schmidt (2021) reconstruct prosomal appendages of Eurypterus tetragonophthalmus and Pentecopterus decorahensis, model the flexure and extension of these appendages.
- A study on the range of motion of prosomal appendages in Megalograptus ohioensis and Mixopterus kiaeri, and on its implications for the knowledge of the likely foraging strategies of these eurypterids, is published by Schmidt et al. (2021).
- Bicknell et al. (2021) report the discovery of exceptionally preserved central nervous system in a specimen of Euproops danae from the Carboniferous Mazon Creek fossil beds (Illinois, United States).
- A specimen of Euproops danae preserving anatomical details of the prosomal musculature is described from the Carboniferous Lawrence Formation (Kansas, United States) by Bicknell et al. (2021).
- Redescription and a study on the phylogenetic relationships of Prolimulus woodwardi is published by Lustri, Laibl & Bicknell (2021).
- Revision of Sloveniolimulus rudkini, based on data from new fossil material from the Anisian Strelovec Formation (Slovenia), is published by Bicknell et al. (2021).
- A study on the anatomy and phylogenetic relationships of Parioscorpio venator is published by Anderson et al. (2021).

== General research ==
- A study on the evolution of the arthropod labrum is published by Budd (2021), who reevaluates the morphology of the Cambrian stem-euarthropod Parapeytoia and evaluates its implications for the knowledge of the origin of the labrum.
- Liu et al. (2021) report the discovery a previously undetected exite at the base of most appendages of Leanchoilia illecebrosa, as well as morphologically similar (and likely homologous) exite in the same position in Naraoia spinosa and Retifacies abnormalis, and evaluate the implications of this discovery for the knowledge of the origin of exites in arthropod phylogeny.
