= Illaenula =

Scientific classification
- Domain: Eukaryota
- Kingdom: Animalia
- Phylum: Arthropoda
- Class: †Trilobita
- Order: †Phacopida
- Family: †Phacopidae
- Genus: †Illaenula; Chlupac, 1977

Genus of trilobites

Illaenula is a genus of trilobites in the order Phacopida (family Phacopidae), that existed during the middle Devonian in what is now the Czech Republic. It was described by Chlupac in 1977, and the type species is Illaenula illaenoides, which was originally described under the genus Ductina. The type locality was the Stínava-Chabicov Formation, in Moravia.
