= Eocryphops =

Eocryphops Temporal range: Early Devonian–Eifelian

Scientific classification
- Domain: Eukaryota
- Kingdom: Animalia
- Phylum: Arthropoda
- Class: †Trilobita
- Order: †Phacopida
- Family: †Phacopidae
- Genus: †Eocryphops; Richter, 1931

Extinct genus of trilobites

Eocryphops is an extinct genus of trilobite in the family Phacopidae. There are at least three described species in Eocryphops.

== Species ==
These three species belong to the genus Eocryphops:

- † Eocryphops albertii Holloway, 2005
- † Eocryphops kayseri
- † Eocryphops termieri
