= Burtonops =

Scientific classification
- Domain: Eukaryota
- Kingdom: Animalia
- Phylum: Arthropoda
- Class: †Trilobita
- Order: †Phacopida
- Family: †Phacopidae
- Genus: †Burtonops; Struve, 199

Extinct genus of trilobites

Burtonops is a genus of trilobites in the order Phacopida. It was described by Struve in 1990.

== Species ==
- Burtonops cristata (Hall, 1861)
- Burtonops gaspensis (Clarke 1908)
- Burtonops stummi (Eldredge 1973)
- Burtonops variabilis (Eldredge 1973)
- Burtonops nasutus (Stumm, 1954)
