= Toxophacops =

Scientific classification
- Kingdom: Animalia
- Phylum: Arthropoda
- Clade: †Artiopoda
- Class: †Trilobita
- Order: †Phacopida
- Family: †Phacopidae
- Genus: †Toxophacops; Zhou & Campbell, 1990

Species
- See text

Genus of trilobites

Toxophacops is a genus of trilobites from the order Phacopida, family Phacopidae. It is from the Devonian period and is very small compared to other genera in Phacopidae.

== Species ==
- Toxophacops nonakai, Japan.
