= Echinophacops =

Scientific classification
- Domain: Eukaryota
- Kingdom: Animalia
- Phylum: Arthropoda
- Class: †Trilobita
- Order: †Phacopida
- Family: †Phacopidae
- Genus: †Echinophacops; Zhou, 1983

Extinct genus of trilobites

Echinophacops is a genus of trilobites in the order Phacopida, that existed during the lower Devonian in what is now China. It was described by Zhou in 1983, and the type species is Echinophacops mirabilis. The type locality was the Zhusileng Formation in Inner Mongolia.
