= Dienstina =

Dienstina Temporal range: Upper Devonian

Scientific classification
- Domain: Eukaryota
- Kingdom: Animalia
- Phylum: Arthropoda
- Class: †Trilobita
- Order: †Phacopida
- Family: †Phacopidae
- Genus: †Dienstina; Richter & Richter, 1931

Species
- Dienstina diensti (Richter & Richter, 1923) (type) synonym Phacopidella diensti

Genus of trilobites

Dienstina is a trilobite in the order Phacopida, that existed during the lower Devonian in what is now Germany. It was described by Richter and Richter in 1931, and the type species is Dienstina diensti, which the authors had originally assigned to the genus Phacopidella in 1923. The type locality was in Oberscheld, Rhenish Massif.
