= Adastocephalum =

Scientific classification
- Domain: Eukaryota
- Kingdom: Animalia
- Phylum: Arthropoda
- Class: †Trilobita
- Order: †Phacopida
- Family: †Phacopidae
- Genus: †Adastocephalum; Mitchell, 1919

Extinct genus of trilobites

Adastocephalum is a genus of trilobite in the order Phacopida, which existed in what is now New South Wales, Australia. It was named by Mitchell in 1919, and the type species is Adastocephalum teleotypicum.
