= Babinops =

Babinops Temporal range: Famennian

Scientific classification
- Domain: Eukaryota
- Kingdom: Animalia
- Phylum: Arthropoda
- Class: †Trilobita
- Order: †Phacopida
- Family: †Phacopidae
- Genus: †Babinops; Feist & Becker, 1997

Extinct genus of trilobites

Babinops is an extinct genus of trilobite in the family Phacopidae.
