= Zhusilengops =

Scientific classification
- Kingdom: Animalia
- Phylum: Arthropoda
- Clade: †Artiopoda
- Class: †Trilobita
- Order: †Phacopida
- Family: †Phacopidae
- Genus: †Zhusilengops; Zhou & Campbell, 1990

Extinct genus of trilobites

Zhusilengops is an extinct genus of trilobite in the class Trilobita.
