= Altaesajania =

Scientific classification
- Kingdom: Animalia
- Phylum: Arthropoda
- Clade: †Artiopoda
- Class: †Trilobita
- Order: †Phacopida
- Family: †Phacopidae
- Genus: †Altaesajania; Maksimova, 1978

Extinct genus of trilobites

Altaesajania is a genus of trilobites in the order Phacopida, which existed in what is now southern Siberia, Russia. It was described by Maksimova in 1978, and the type species is Altaesajania primitiva, originally described as a species of Phacopidella by Maksimova in 1960.
