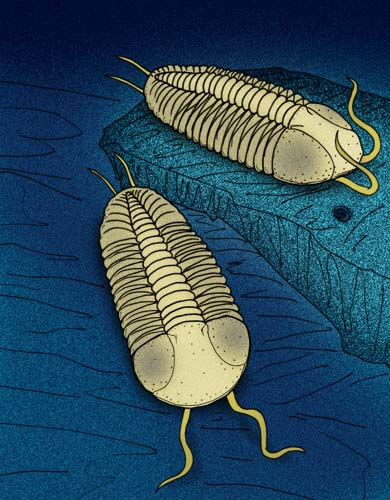
- Artist's reconstruction

Scientific classification
- Domain: Eukaryota
- Kingdom: Animalia
- Phylum: Arthropoda
- Class: †Trilobita
- Order: †Phacopida
- Family: †Phacopidae
- Genus: †Afrops; Alberti, 1983
- Species: †A. larvifer

Binomial name
- †Afrops larvifer Alberti, 1983

= Afrops =

Afrops Temporal range: Pragian

Genus of trilobites

Afrops larvifer ("Eye of Africa bearing a mask") is a phacopid trilobite which lived in a marine environment during the Pragian stage in what is now southwestern Algeria. The holotype and only known specimen is an incomplete cephalon that was described by G. Alberti in 1983. It is the only species in the genus Afrops.
