= Geesops =

Geesops Temporal range: Eifelian–Middle Devonian

Scientific classification
- Domain: Eukaryota
- Kingdom: Animalia
- Phylum: Arthropoda
- Class: †Trilobita
- Order: †Phacopida
- Family: †Phacopidae
- Genus: †Geesops; Struve, 1972

Extinct genus of trilobites

Geesops is an extinct genus of trilobites in the family Phacopidae. There are about five described species in Geesops.

== Species ==
These five species belong to the genus Geesops:

- Geesops battidohmi
- Geesops brunopauli
- Geesops icovellaunae Viersen, Taghon & Magrean, 2019
- Geesops sparsinodosus
- Geesops synapticus
