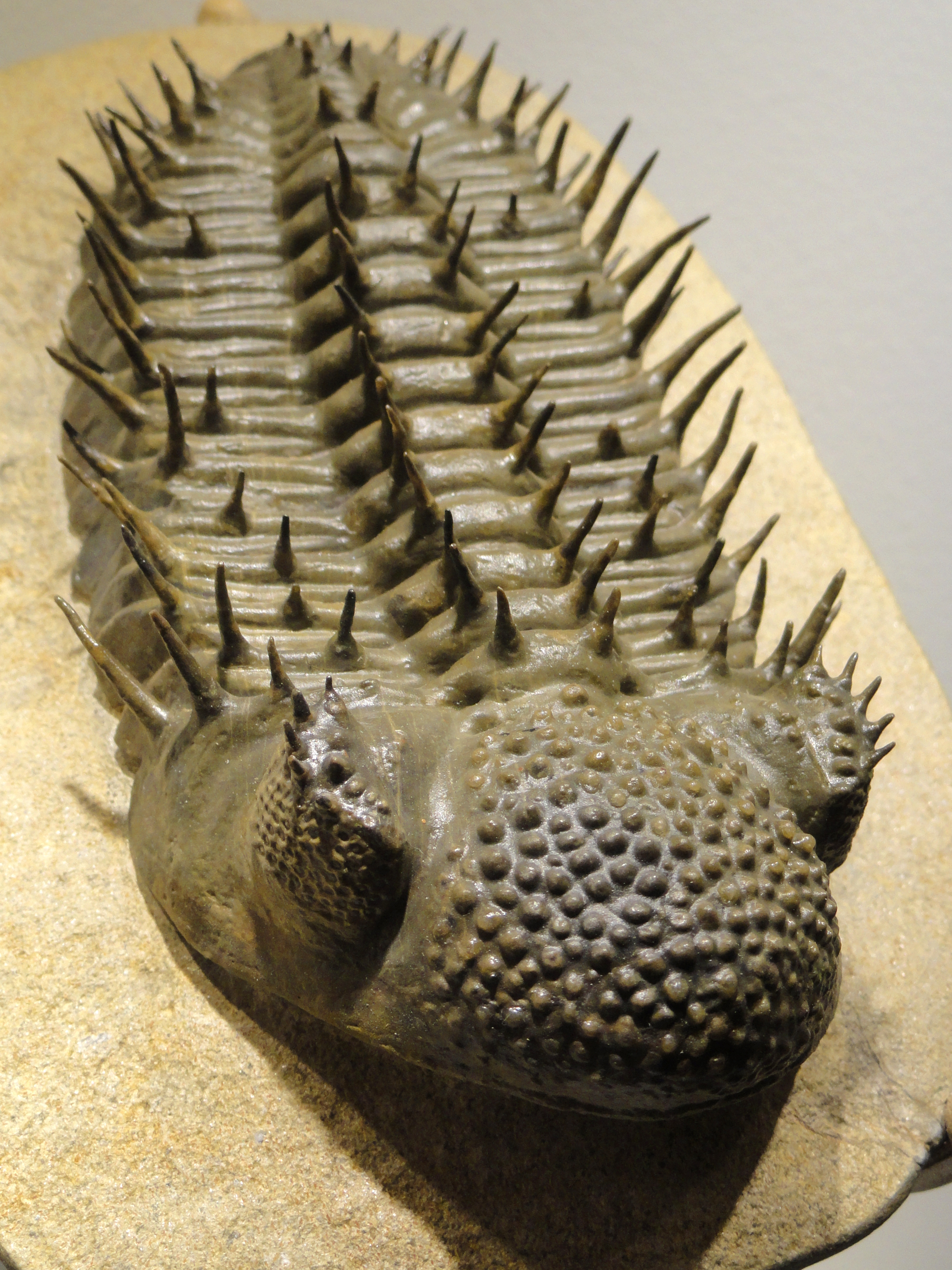
- D. armatus from Morocco

Scientific classification
- Domain: Eukaryota
- Kingdom: Animalia
- Phylum: Arthropoda
- Class: †Trilobita
- Order: †Phacopida
- Family: †Phacopidae
- Genus: †Drotops; Struve, 1990

Species
- D. armatus Struve, 1995; D. a. accurata Struve, 1995; D. a. perspinosa Struve, 1995; D. a. armata Struve, 1995; D. a. hoplites Struve, 1995; D. megalomanicus Struve, 1990; D. m. megalomanicus Struve, 1995; D. m. subornatus Struve, 1995

= Drotops =

Drotops Temporal range: Upper Eifelian

Extinct genus of trilobites

Drotops is a genus of trilobites from the order Phacopida, family Phacopidae that lived during the Eifelian of the Middle Devonian. It was described by Struve in 1990 under type species Drotops megalomanicus. Their fossils are found in present-day Morocco, specifically the Maïder Region located South West of Erfoud.

== Description ==
Drotops is large in comparison to most other trilobite genera, and can reach lengths of 20 centimetres (~10 in). Drotops can be distinguished from other genera in this family by its size. It looks generally like a very large Phacops with large pustules covering its surface, with a high density on the glabella. Drotops armatus is distinguished from Drotops megalomanicus because of its spines present on the eye ridges and along the thorax. The species have fairly large schizochroal eyes which were mounted on turret-like structures that gave a near 360-degree field of view. As with many other trilobites, individuals curl into a ball to protect itself from the predators with its hard exoskeleton.

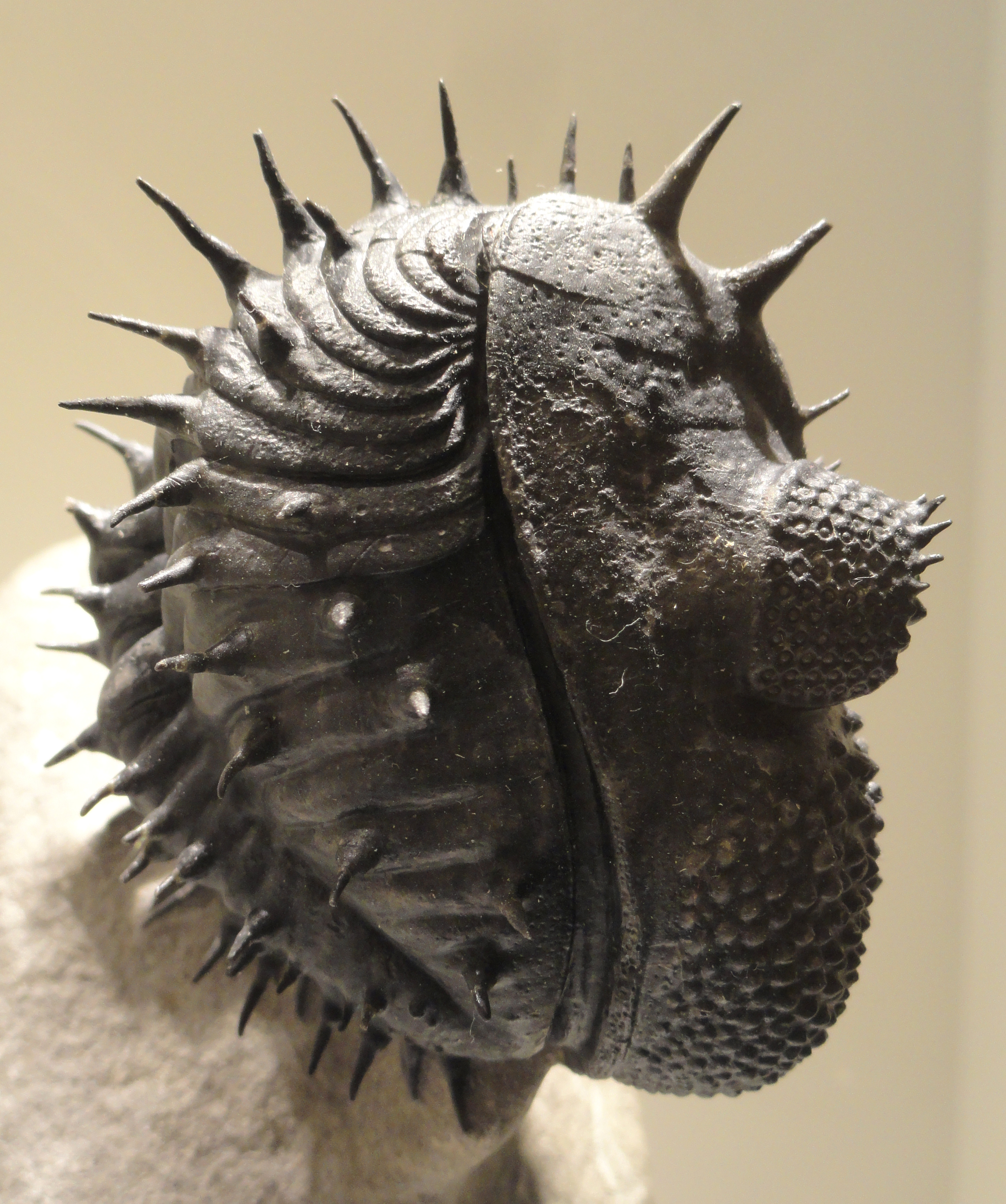
An enrolled Drotops armatus.

== Species ==
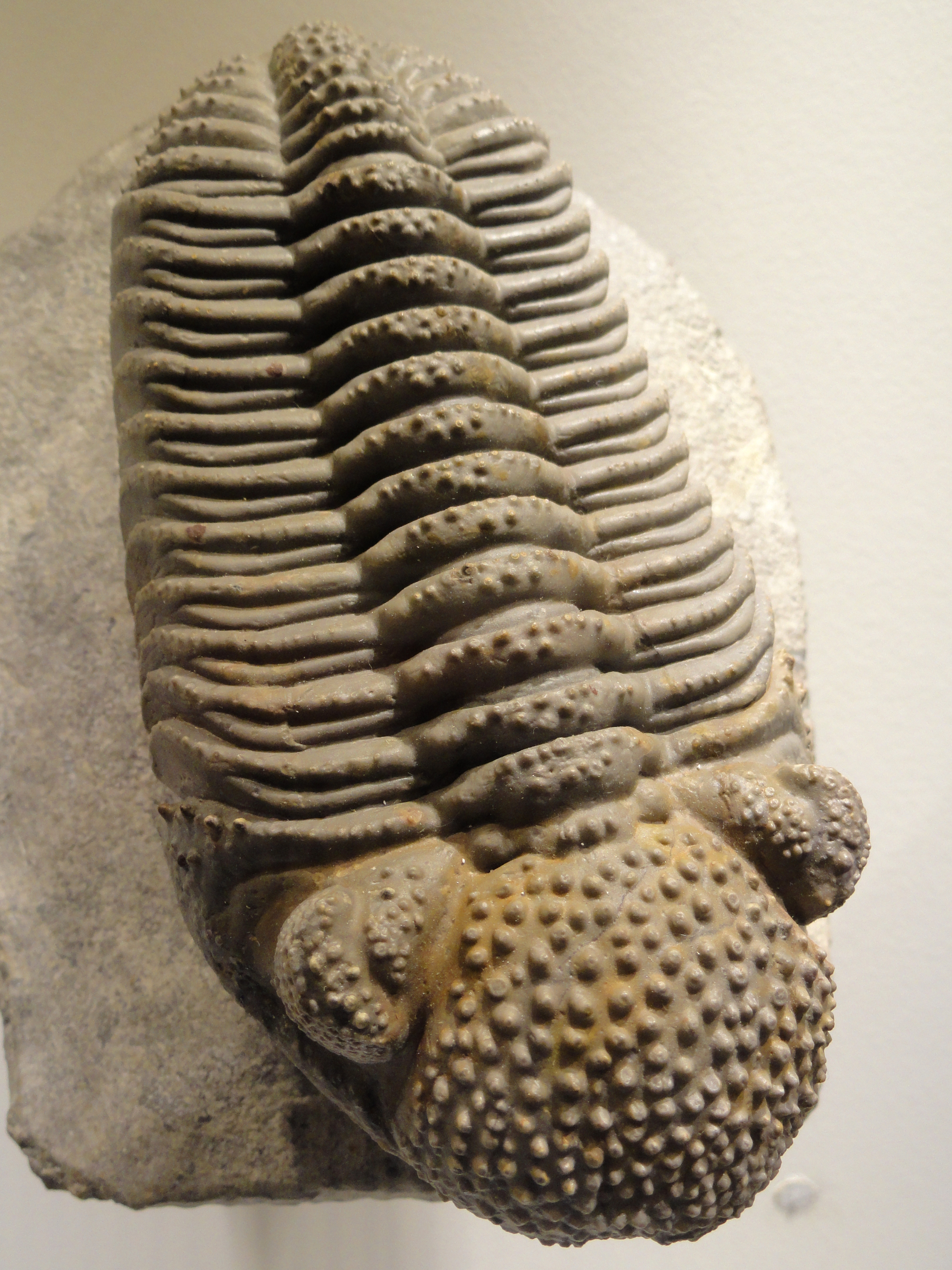
D. megalomanicus megalomanicus

Drotops megalomanicus (megalomanicus from the Greek "μεγαλο": megalo-, meaning large or great, and "μανία": mania, meaning madness, frenzy) is described from fossils found in Jbel Issoumour, Morocco.

Drotops armatus (armatus from the Latin "armātus" meaning armed or fortified) is from Jbel Issoumour, Morocco.

Drotops armatus is similar in appearance to the genus Phacops, albeit much larger. A significant feature of this species is that it has spines protruding from its exoskeleton, presumably to deter predators. D. armatus has an enlarged glabella covered in rounded pustules, and schizochroal eyes which contained multiple lenses.
