= Zaplaops =

Scientific classification
- Domain: Eukaryota
- Kingdom: Animalia
- Phylum: Arthropoda
- Class: †Trilobita
- Order: †Phacopida
- Family: †Phacopidae
- Genus: †Zaplaops; Baldis & Blasco, 1978

Extinct genus of trilobites

Zaplaops is an extinct genus of trilobite in the family Phacopidae.
