= Magreanops =

Magreanops Temporal range: Late Devonian Frasnian

Scientific classification
- Kingdom: Animalia
- Phylum: Arthropoda
- Clade: †Artiopoda
- Class: †Trilobita
- Order: †Phacopida
- Family: †Phacopidae
- Genus: †Magreanops; Van Viersen & Vanherle, 2018

Type species
- †Magreanops renateae Van Viersen & Vanherle, 2018

Species
- †Magreanops renateae Van Viersen & Vanherle, 2018 (type); †Magreanops monachus Van Viersen & Vanherle, 2018

Genus of phacopid trilobites

Magreanops is a phacopid trilobite in the family Phacopidae. The type species is Magreanops renateae and the genus also includes Magreanops monachus, both described from the Frasnian-aged Bovesse Formation. and Moulin Liénaux Formations in Belgium during 2018.
