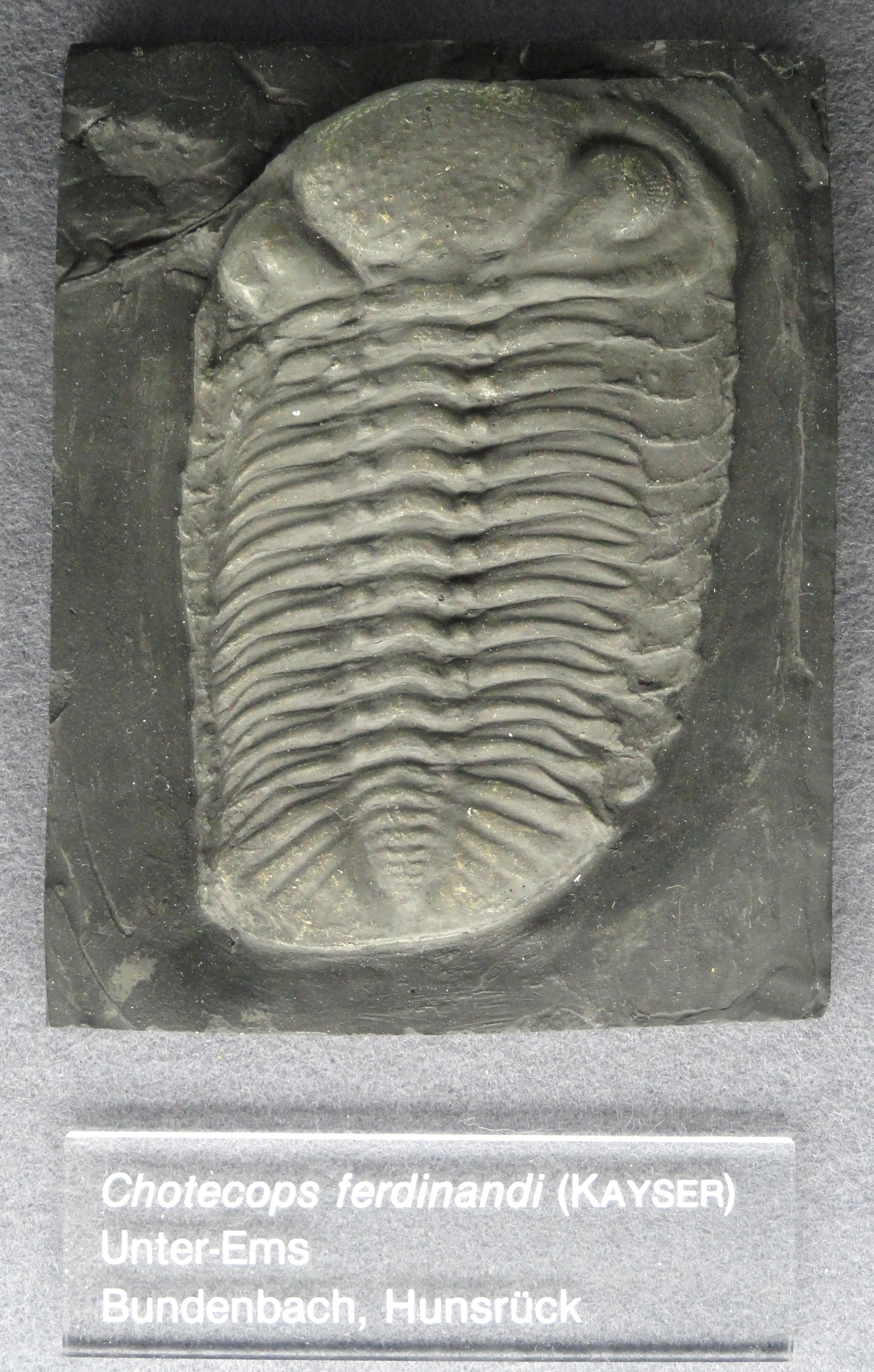
- Chotecops ferdinandi

Scientific classification
- Kingdom: Animalia
- Phylum: Arthropoda
- Clade: †Artiopoda
- Class: †Trilobita
- Order: †Phacopida
- Family: †Phacopidae
- Genus: †Chotecops; Chlupac, 1971

Species
- See text

= Chotecops =

Chotecops Temporal range: Emsian–Famennian

Genus of trilobites

Chotecops is a genus of trilobites from the order Phacopida, suborder Phacopina, family Phacopidae. It was initially erected as a subgenus of Phacops but some later authors thought it distinctive enough to raise its status. Species assigned to this genus occur between the Emsian and the Famennian. Chotecops is the most abundant trilobite in the Hunsrück Slate and due to the excellent preservation, often soft tissue such as antennae and legs have been preserved as a thin sheet of pyrite.

== Description ==
Like in all sighted Phacopina, the eyes of Chotecops are compounded of very large, separately set lenses without a common cornea (so called schizochroal eyes), and like almost all other Phacopina, the articulate mid-length part of the body (or thorax) in Chotecops has 11 segments.

The central raised area of the cephalon (called glabella) consists from back to front of an occipital ring, but unlike in its close relative Phacops the preoccipital ring in Chotecops is flat and not reduced to its sides, and the furrow defining its front (S1) is shallow. One or two pairs of furrows (S2 and S3) may be visible further to the front which are weak at best. The large frontal lobe is moderately vaulted and falls steeply to the furrow that defines the border at its front. The space between the glabella and the eyebrow (or palpebral area) is flat. The headshield has a finer sculpture. The tailshield (or pygidium) is weakly furrowed. These characters distinguish it from Phacops.

Some known species and locations.

- C. ferdinandi (Kayser, 1880), Hunsrück Germany.
- C. opitzi Struve, 1985, Hunsrück Germany.
- C. zofiae Chlupac, 1993, is known from the Middle or Upper Devonian of Poland (near the Givetian/Frasnian border, Holy Cross Mountains).
- C. hoseri (Hawle et Corda, 1847), Barrandian, Czech republic (Eifelian).
- C. auspex (Chlupáč, 1971), Barrandian, Czech republic (Eifelian).
- C. glabrens (Chlupáč, 1977), Barrandian, Czech republic (Emsian).
