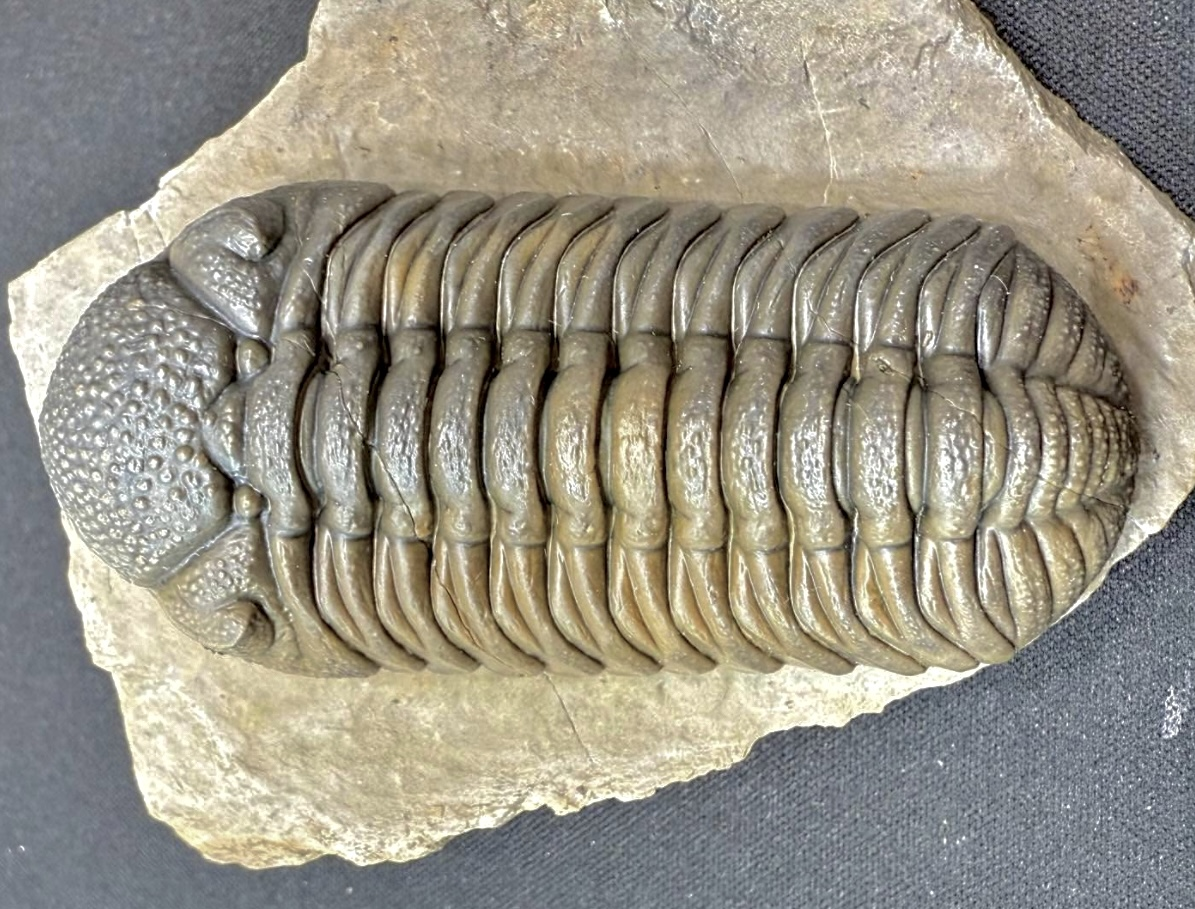
- Morocops fossil

Scientific classification
- Kingdom: Animalia
- Phylum: Arthropoda
- Clade: †Artiopoda
- Class: †Trilobita
- Order: †Phacopida
- Family: †Phacopidae
- Genus: †Morocops; Basse 2006, Mckeller & Chatterton 2009

Species
- †Morocops granulops McKellar & Chatterton, 2009; †Morocops ovatus McKellar & Chatterton, 2009

= Morocops =

Morocops Temporal range: Eifelian, Middle Devonian

Genus of phacopid trilobites

Morocops is a phacopid trilobite in the family Phacopidae. They were previously considered part of the Phacops genus, but were later reclassified as their own genus.

Like many trilobites of the family Phacopidae they occur throughout the Middle Devonian strata of southern Morocco, what then would have been part of the northern coast of the super continent of Gondwana.

The genus includes Morocops granulops and Morocops ovatus, which are primarily distinguished by the structure of their eyes
