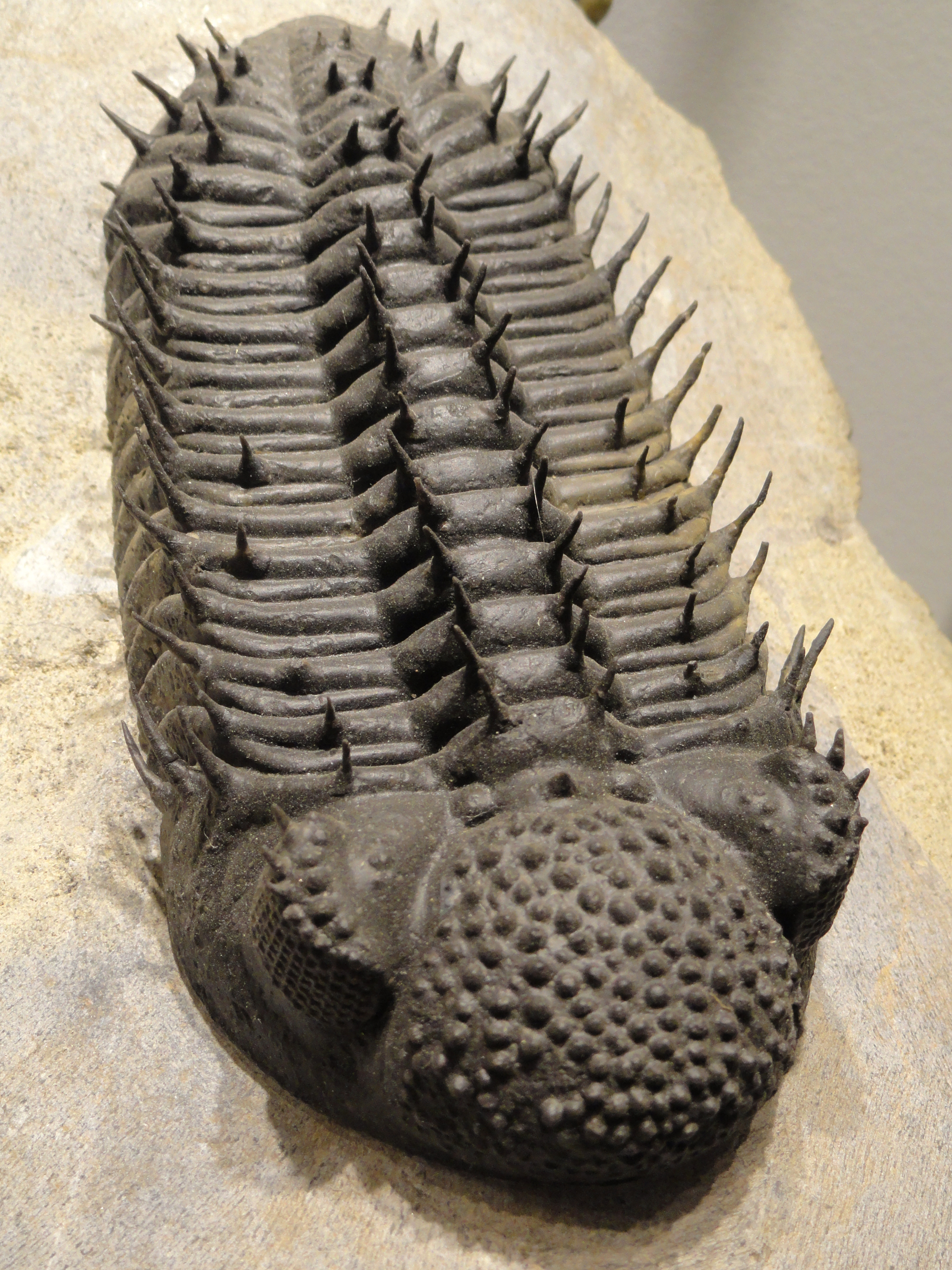
- Drotops armatus

Scientific classification
- Kingdom: Animalia
- Phylum: Arthropoda
- Clade: †Artiopoda
- Class: †Trilobita
- Order: †Phacopida
- Suborder: †Phacopina
- Superfamily: †Phacopoidea
- Family: †Phacopidae; Hawle & Corda, 1847

= Phacopidae =

Phacopidae Temporal range: Katian–Devonian

Extinct family of trilobites

Phacopidae is a family of phacopid trilobites that ranges from the Lower Ordovician to the Upper Devonian, with representatives in all paleocontinents.

== Description ==
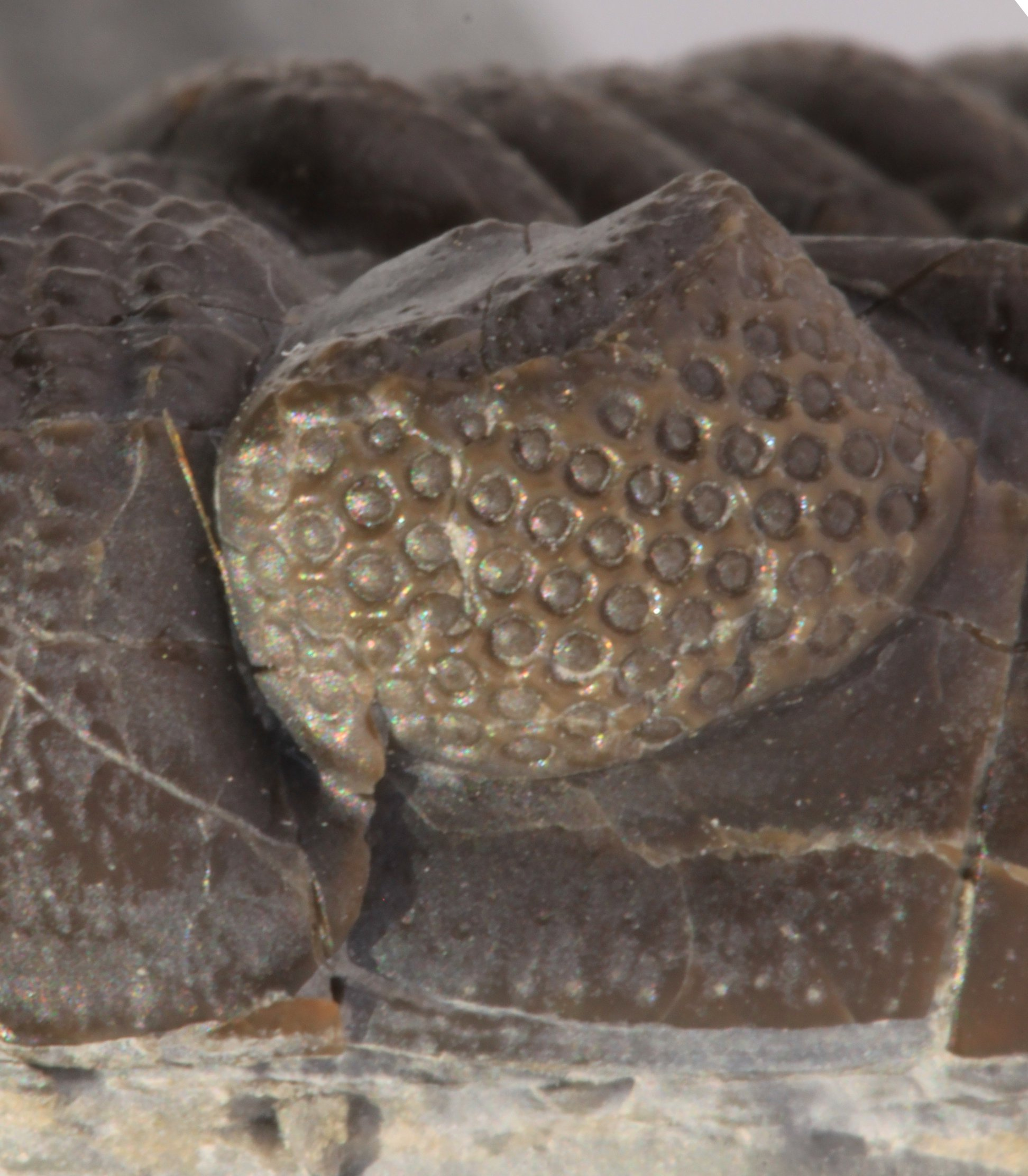
Schizochroal eye of Elredgeops rana

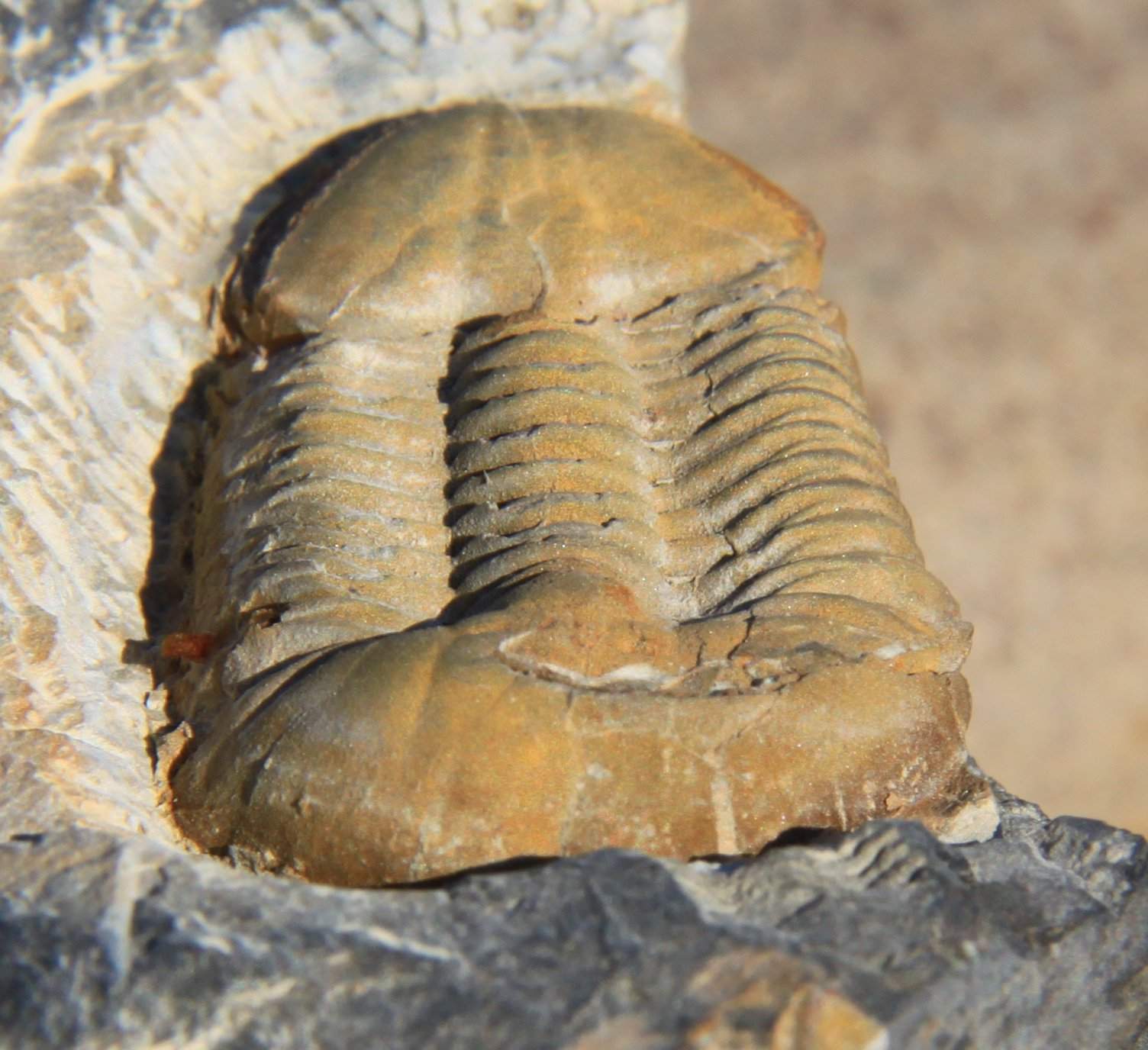
Ductina vietnamica, a phacopid that lacks eyes

As in all Phacopina, the eyes (if present) consist of very large (0.5 mm in Phacops rana), separately set lenses without a common cornea (so called schizochroal eyes). However, several phacopids have very few lenses, such as the species of the genera Cryphops, Denckmannites, Dienstina, Eucryphops, Nephranops, and Plagiolaria, or lack eyes altogether, like Afrops, Dianops, Ductina, and Trimerocephalus. The natural fracture lines (sutures) of the head run along the top edges of the compound eye. From the back of the eye these cut to the side of the head (proparian) and not to the back. In front of the eye, the right and left facial sutures connect in front of the inflated glabella and consequently the free cheeks (or librigenae) are yoked as a single piece. In some of the eyeless genera (Ductina) the suture coincides with the marginal suture, and thus appears to be absent. The part of the skeleton that is "tucked under" (the doublure) has no sutures crossing it to form a rostral plate. The thorax has 11 (rarely 10) segments, the side lobes (or pleurae) are furrowed, and the articulating facets distinct. The tailshield (or pygidium) is always smaller than the headshield (or cephalon), a situation called micropygous.

In the Phacopidae a merger of the anterior and the two pairs of neighbouring lobes of the glabella forms a frontal lobe that expands forward and can be inflated and overhanging the frontal border. To the back of the glabella two furrows (or sometimes one) cross the glabella forming two rings ("intercalating ring" and "occipital ring"). The cephalon does not end in genal spines. The side lobes of the thorax (or pleurae, singular pleura) have rounded ends. The pygidium is well rounded, semicircular or shorter, with an entire margin, and without lateral and posterior projections. In many Phacopidae, where the facial sutures are apparently continuous and well developed, they were evidently nonfunctional in ecdysis, since no separate free cheeks can be found.

== Taxonomy ==
The Phacopinae likely have evolved from the Pterygometopidae, and the presumed sister taxon is Podowrinella.

== Distribution ==
The earliest species and the only one known from the Ordovician (upper Katian) is Sambremeusaspis fossesensis. The Phacopidae became a prominent family during the Silurian and had an enormous taxonomic diversity during the Devonian. Phacopids reached their maximum diversity during the Middle Devonian, after which the clade went into a diversity decline in the Late Devonian due to repeated eustatic sea level changes.

== Genera ==
The following genera are included:

- Acernaspis
- Acuticryphops
- Adastocephalum
- Afrops
- Ainasuella
- Altaesajania
- Ananaspis
- Angulophacops
- Arduennops
- Atopophacops
- Babinops
- Boeckops
- Burtonops
- Chotecops
- Cryphops
- Cultrops
- Denckmannites
- Dianops
- Dienstina
- Drotops
- Ductina
- Echidnops
- Echinophacops
- Eldredgeops
- Eocryphops
- Eophacops
- Geesops
- Hypsipariops
- Illaenula
- Kainops
- Liolophops
- Lochkovella
- Magreanops
- Morocops
- Nandanaspis
- Nephranomma
- Nephranops
- Nyterops
- Omegops
- Orygmatos
- Paciphacops
- Pedinopariops
- Phacopidella
- Phacops
- Plagiolaria
- Portlockia
- Prokops
- Rabienops
- Reedops
- Rhinophacops
- Rhinoreedops
- Sambremeusaspis
- Signatops
- Somatrikelon
- Spinicryphops
- Struveaspis
- Struveops
- Tangbailaspis
- Teichertops
- Toxophacops
- Trimerocephalus
- Viaphacops
- Weyerites
- Zaplaops
- Zhusilengops
