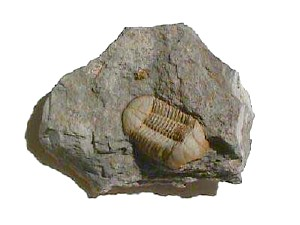
- Ductina vietnamica

Scientific classification
- Domain: Eukaryota
- Kingdom: Animalia
- Phylum: Arthropoda
- Class: †Trilobita
- Order: †Phacopida
- Family: †Phacopidae
- Genus: †Ductina; Richter and Richter, 1931

Species
- D. ductifrons (R. & E. Richter, 1926) (Type) synonym Phacopidella ductifrons; D. vietnamica (Maximova, 1965)

= Ductina =

Ductina Temporal range: Pragian to Famennian

Genus of extinct trilobites

Ductina is a genus of extinct, small to average sized, eyeless phacopid trilobite, that lived during the Devonian.

== Description ==
The body of Ductina is small to average (up to 5 centimetres (2.0 in)), 1 1/4 to 2 times as long as wide, blunted oval. Body without any adornment. The headshield (or cephalon) is 2 to 3 times as wide as it is long in the direction of the axis (or sagittally). The cephalic axis (or glabella) is strongly widening forward with shallow furrows, the front curving downward to end at an approximate straight angle to the plain of the axis. Another shallow furrow (the occipital furrow), with left and right a deep pit (apodemal pit), crosses to the back of the glabella to define a narrow band (or occipital ring), and just in front left and right a small lobe is defined by shallow furrows and a deep pits. The back of the cephalon is often broken, obscuring the features of the occipital ring. Eyes and eye ridges (palpebral lobes) are absent. The natural fracture lines (sutures) of the cephalon coincide with its margin (unique with the Phacopidae), so there are no free cheeks (or librigenae). The genal angles are rounded, not truncated, no genal spine. The thorax has 10 segments, and the width of the axis is about 1/3 of the thorax. Tailpiece (or pygidium) is 20 to 35% of the length of the body. The pygidial axis (or rachis) is pointed (or acute), ending at the border.

== Distribution ==
The species of the genus Ductina lived during the Devonian in Europe and South-East Asia.

Fossils of D. vietnamica have been found in the Eifelian of China (Nandan Formation, Luofu, Nandan County, Guangxi Province 24°30′N 115°36′E, and Hunan Province); and in the Pragian of Vietnam (Song Hiem, Mia Le Beds 22°12′N 106°12′E).

Fossils of D. ductifrons have been found in the Famennian of the United Kingdom, Germany (Eskesberg, Nehden, Varresbeck, all near Wupperthal), Poland (near Psiarnia, in the Southern part of the Holy Cross Mountains 50°53′N 20°55′E), and the Western Urals in Russia.

== Habitat ==
All phacopids were probably marine bottom-dwellers. D. vietnamica has been found with several open water species (Nandan Formation in Guanxi, China), indicating deep and dark waters, probably poor in oxygen near the bottom where Ductina lived. It has also been found as part of a species rich community characteristic of a shallow coral sea.

== Key to the species ==
1	Body symmetrically elliptic, 1 1/4 to 1 1/2 times as long as wide, retaining the same width over the frontal half of the thorax. Glabellar furrow evenly shallow and discernible to the cephalic margin. Pygidium 2 times or more wider than long. Rachis has shallow but clear furrows, is narrowly triangular, with sides bending inward towards the back, to end at an angle of about 45° with the axis. Famennian. United Kingdom; Eifel and Thüringen, Germany; Holy Cross Mountains, Poland; West side of the Urals, Russia. → D. ductifrons
-	Body slightly reverse egg shaped, 1 2/3 to 2 times as long as wide, widest at the back of the cephalon, the thorax slightly tapering backwards. Glabellar furrow quickly shallower and indiscernible near the cephalic margin. Pygidium 1 1/4 to 1 1/2 times wider than long. Rachis has faint, hardly discernible furrows, is narrowly triangular with approximate straight sides along the length. Pragian to Eifelian. Guangxi and Hunan, Southern China; Vietnam. → D. vietnamica

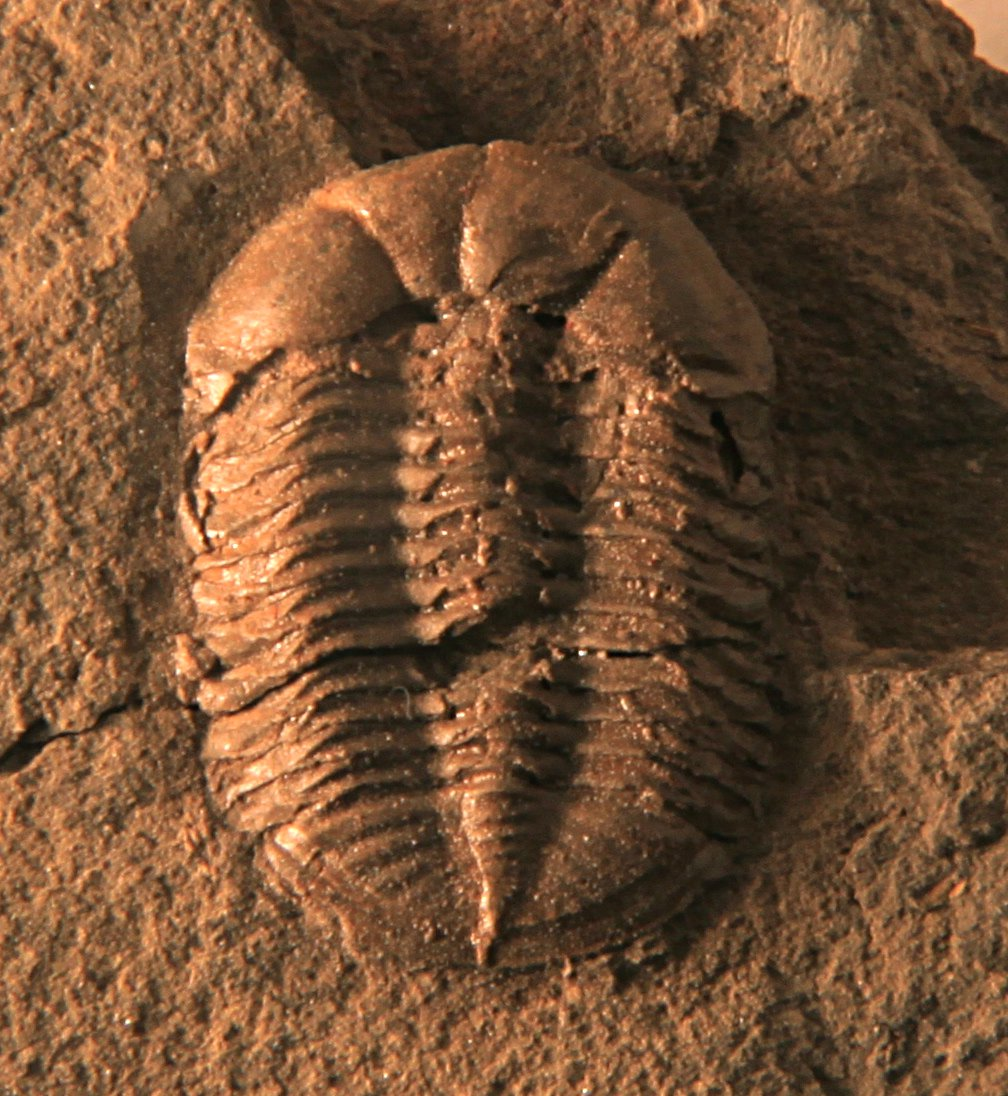
Ductina ductifrons, from Wupperthal, Germany

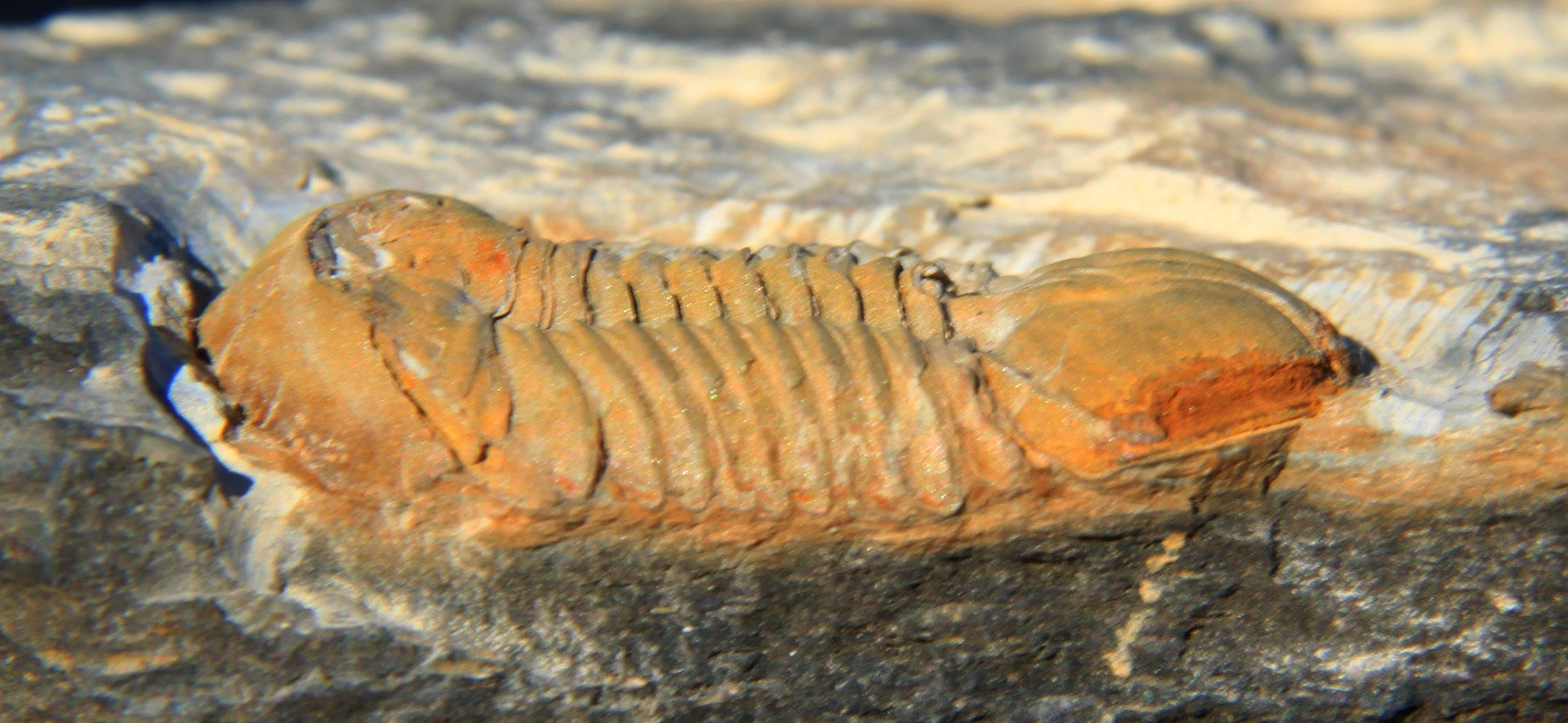
Ductina vietnamica, lateral view

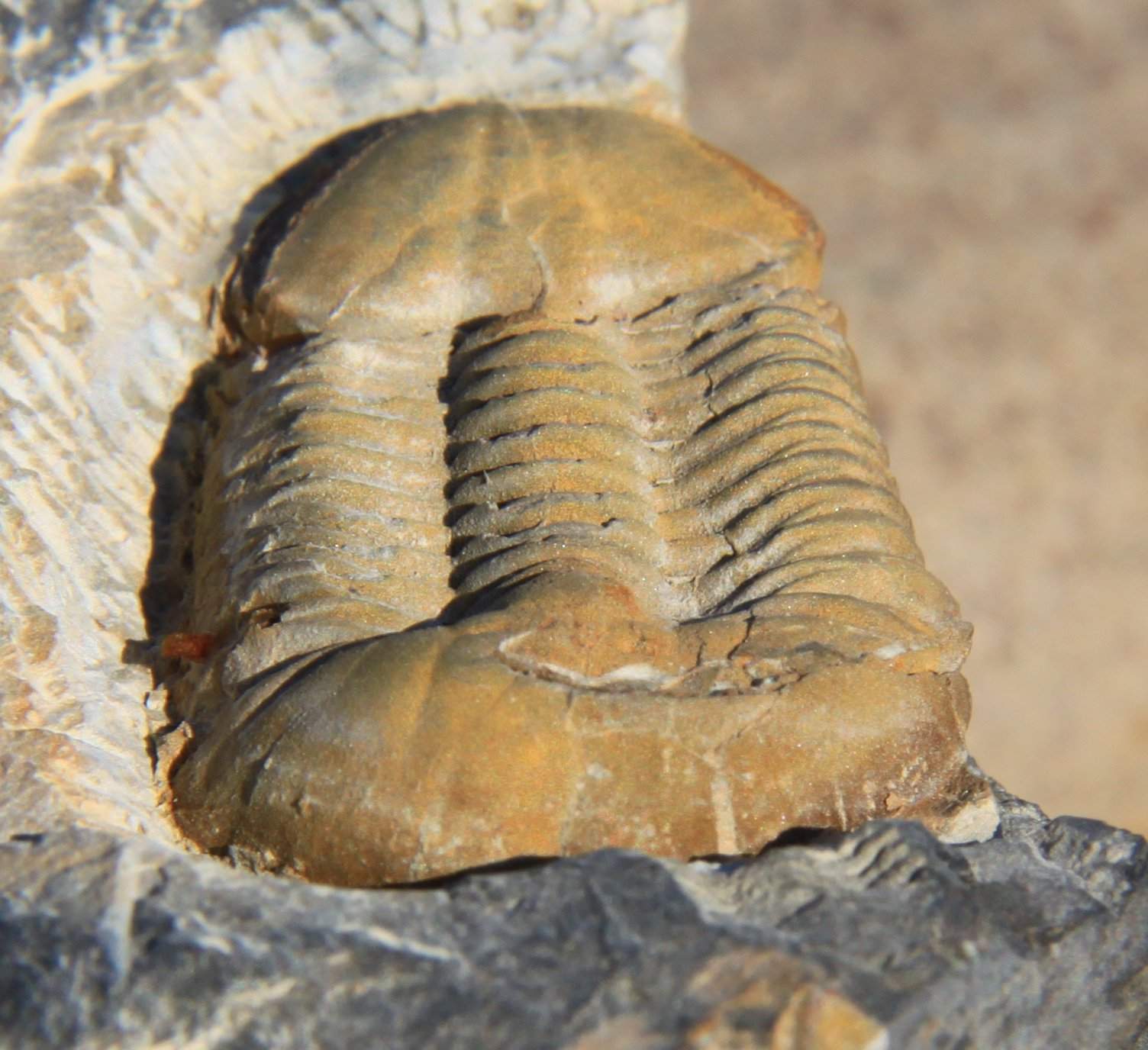
Ductina vietnamica, frontal view

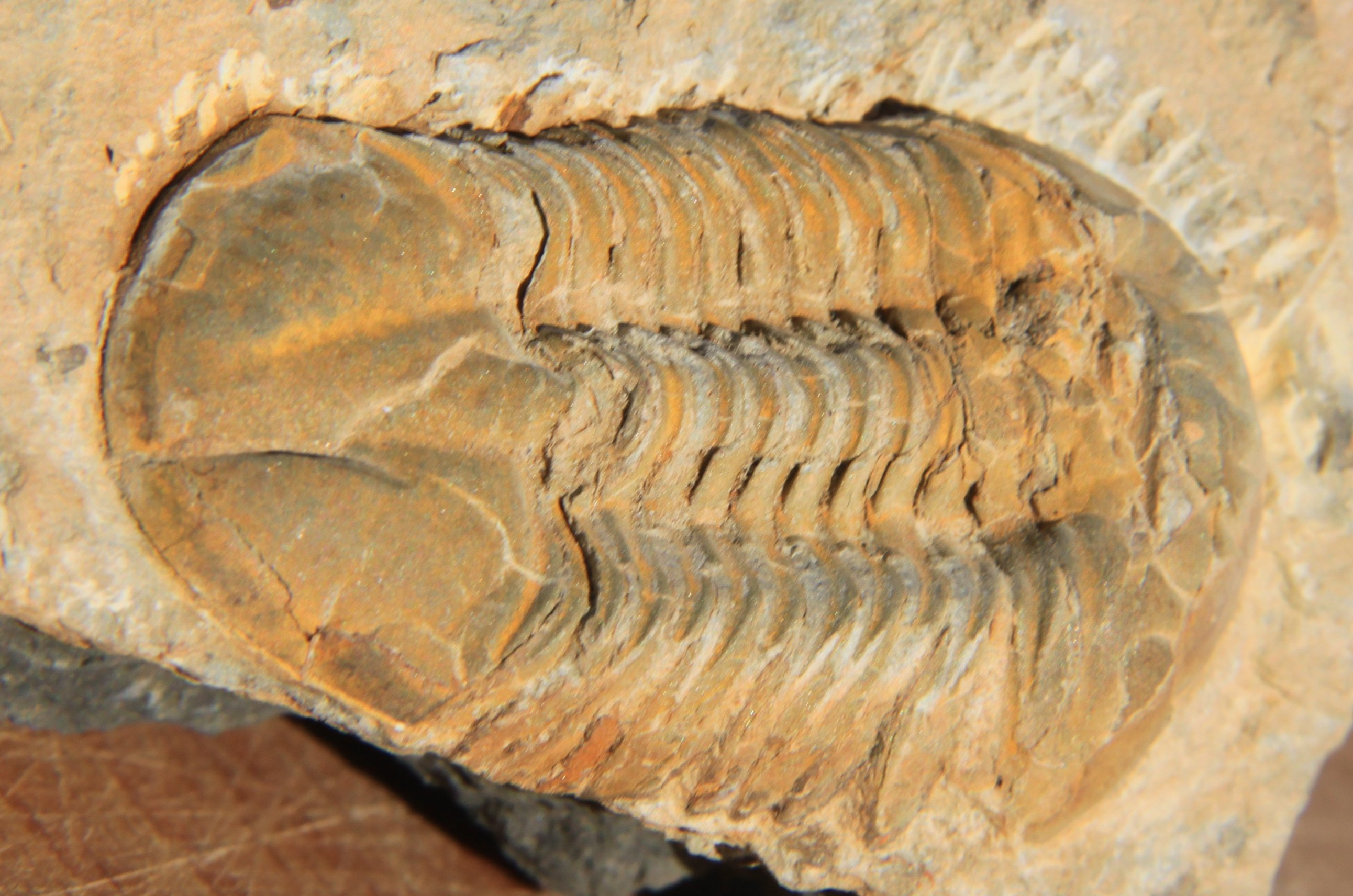
Ductina vietnamica, dorsal view
