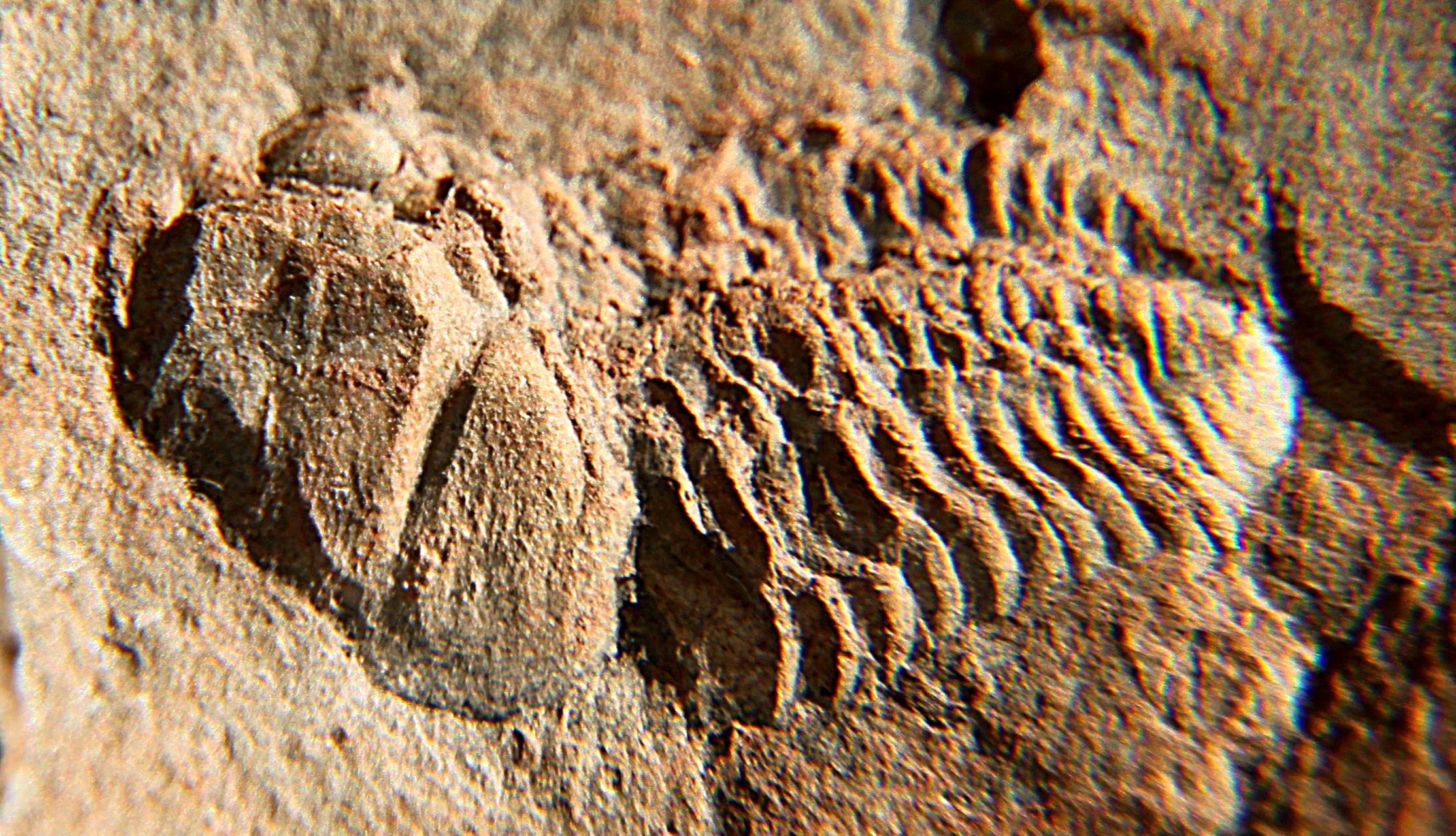
- Acuticryphops acuticeps

Scientific classification
- Domain: Eukaryota
- Kingdom: Animalia
- Phylum: Arthropoda
- Class: †Trilobita
- Order: †Phacopida
- Family: †Phacopidae
- Genus: †Acuticryphops; Cronier and Feist, 2000

Species
- Acuticryphops acuticeps (Kayser, 1889) (type) = Phacops acuticeps, Cryphops acuticeps

= Acuticryphops =

Acuticryphops Temporal range: Frasnian

Extinct genus of trilobites

Acuticryphops is a genus of trilobite that lived during the late Frasnian, particularly between the Lower and Upper Kellwasser horizons. It is known from mid-European Avalonia (Harz Mountains and Rhenish Slate Mountains) and Armorica (Thuringia: Schleiz) and the North Gondwana margin (Coumiac, France and central Morocco).

== Taxonomy ==
Acuticryphops was probably ancestral to the species of the genus Trimerocephalus, and mainly differs from its supposed eyeless descendants by retaining small eyes.

== Evolution ==
Acuticryphops acuticeps is an example of rapid evolution. Subsequent populations exhibit a declining average and an increasing variation in the number of lenses per eye from about 10 to between 7 and 1. This rapid trend does not occur in other characters of the exoskeleton. This suggests the absence rather than the presence of selective pressure on the number of lenses per eye. This is presumably associated with the eustatic deepening that occurred.

== Description ==
In dorsal view, Acuticryphops acuticeps has a rounded triangular headshield (or cephalon). The central raised area of the cephalon (or glabella) is roughly pentangular, and it substantially overhangs the frontal cephalic border. The cheeks are roughly triangular, with the eyes (or palpebral lobes) occupying the frontal quarter of its length. The eye has between 1 and 11 or more individual lenses. The pygidium is more than 3 times wider than long and is almost rectangular because the posterior thorax segments angle backwards when approaching the side of the exoskeleton.
