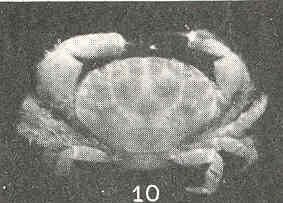
- Xanthodius biunguis female crab

Scientific classification
- Kingdom: Animalia
- Phylum: Arthropoda
- Class: Malacostraca
- Order: Decapoda
- Suborder: Pleocyemata
- Infraorder: Brachyura
- Family: Xanthidae
- Subfamily: Xanthinae
- Genus: Xanthodius; Stimpson, 1859

= Xanthodius =

Genus of crabs

Xanthodius is a genus of crabs in the family Xanthidae, containing one exclusively fossil species and the following species:

- Xanthodius cooksoni (Miers in Günther, 1877)
- †Xanthodius falconensis Schweitzer, Hyžný & Feldmann, 2021
- Xanthodius inaequalis (Olivier, 1791)
- †Xanthodius kambaraensis Rathbun, 1945
- Xanthodius sternberghii Stimpson, 1859
