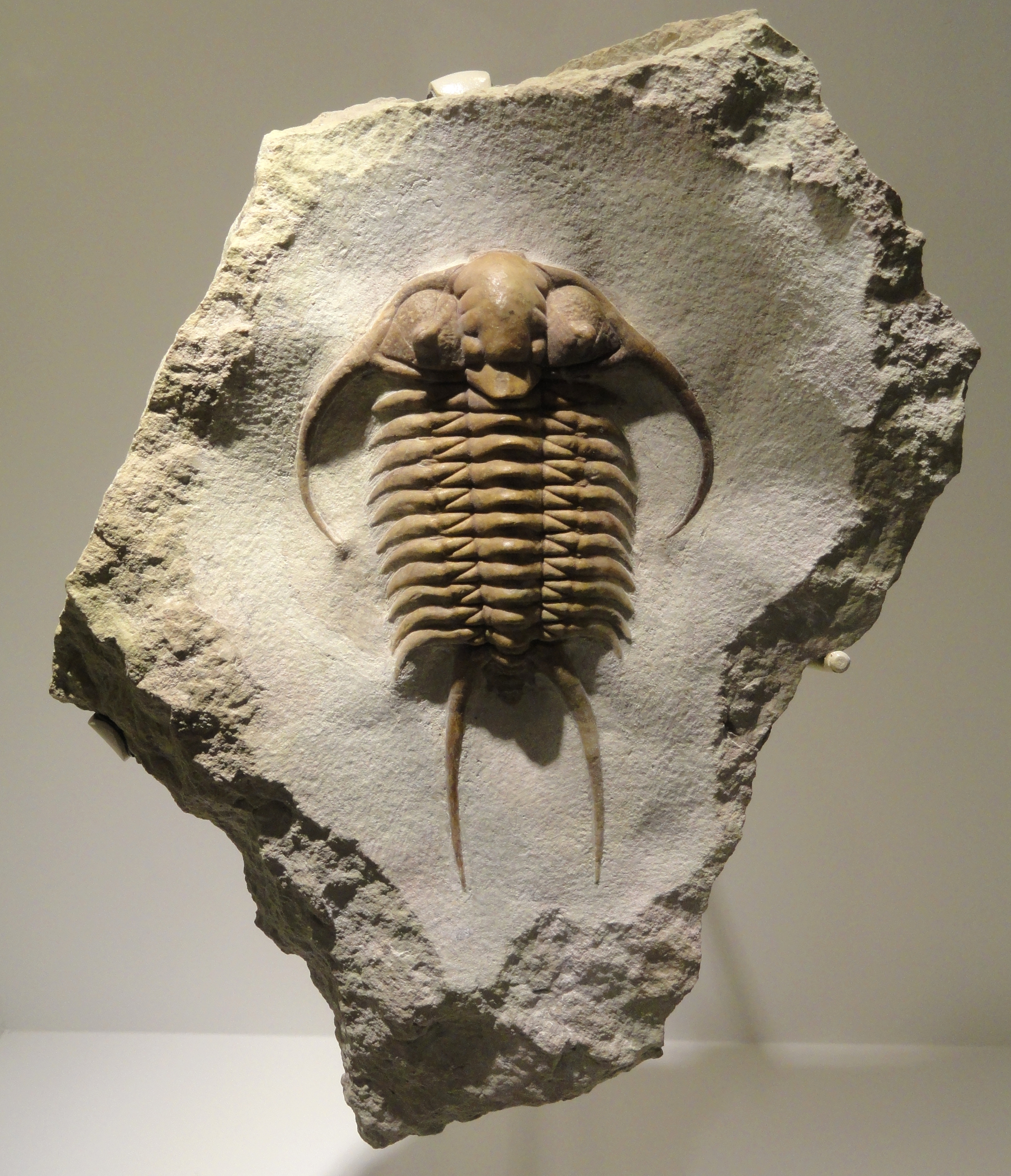
- Paraceraurus exsul, Middle Ordovician, St. Petersburg region, Russia

Scientific classification
- Domain: Eukaryota
- Kingdom: Animalia
- Phylum: Arthropoda
- Class: †Trilobita
- Order: †Phacopida
- Suborder: †Cheirurina
- Family: †Cheiruridae; Hawle & Corda, 1847

Subfamilies
- †Cheirurinae Hawle & Corda, 1847; †Acantoparyphinae Wittington & Evitt, 1954; †Cyrtometopinae Öpik, 1937; †Deiphoninae Raimond, 1913; †Eccoptochilinae Lane, 1971; †Heliomerinae Evitt, 1951; †Pilekiinae Sdzuy, 1955; †Sphaerexochinae Öpik, 1937

= Cheiruridae =

Cheiruridae Temporal range: Furongian–Givetian

Extinct family of trilobites

Cheiruridae is a family of phacopid trilobites of the suborder Cheirurina. Its members, as with other members of the suborder, had distinctive pygidial modified into finger-like spines. They first appeared in the uppermost Cambrian (upper Furongian), and persisted until the end of the Middle Devonian (Givetian). Currently about 657 species assigned to 99 genera are included.

== Distribution ==
The subfamily Cheirurina with 269 species in 38 genera occur from the Floian to the Givetian and are probably monophyletic. The 109 species in 15 genera of the Acanthoparyphinae are also probably monophyletic, and are known from the Floian to the Ludfordian. The Cyrtometopinae were present between the Floian and the Upper Katian, enveloping 22 species in 5 genera, of which the monophyly is unclear. The Deiphoninae are probably monophyletic, occur from the Dapingian to the Gorstian, having 71 species assigned to 6 genera. The possibly paraphyletic Eccoptochilinae with 67 species in 13 genera are known between the Floian and upper Katian. The Heliomerinae are a small monophyletic group with 13 species in 2 genera. The Pilekiinae are the earliest subfamily and therefore certainly paraphyletic, occurring in the upper Furongian and going extinct in the Darriwilian with 56 known species assigned to 19 genera. The monotypic Sphaerexochinae has about 50 species between the Floian and Přídolí.

== Genera ==
- †Acanthoparypha
- †Actinopeltis
- †Anacheirurus
- †Anasobella
- †Ancyginaspis
- †Apollonaspis
- †Arcticeraurinella
- †Areia
- †Areiaspis
- †Azyptyx
- †Barrandeopeltis
- †Borealaspis
- †Bornholmaspis
- †Bufoceraurus
- †Ceraurinella
- †Ceraurinium
- †Ceraurinus
- †Cerauromeros
- †Cerauropeltis
- †Ceraurus
- †Chashania
- †Cheirurus (type genus)
- †Chiozoon
- †Contracheirurus
- †Courtessolium
- †Crotalocephalides
- †Crotalocephalina
- †Crotalocephalus
- †Cybelloides
- †Cyrtometopus
- †Deiphon
- †Didrepanon
- †Eccoptochile
- †Eccoptochiloides
- †Emsurina
- †Eocheirurus
- †Forteyops
- †Foulonia
- †Gabriceraurus
- †Geracephalina
- †Hadromeros
- †Hammannopyge
- †Hapsiceraurus
- †Heliomera
- †Heliomeroides
- †Holia
- †Hyrokybe
- †Junggarella
- †Kawina
- †Kolymella
- †Koraipsis
- †Krattaspis
- †Ktenoura
- †Landyia
- †Laneites
- †Lehua
- †Leviceraurus
- †Macrogrammus
- †Metapliomerops
- †Nieszkowskia
- †Onycopyge
- †Osekaspis
- †Pandaspinapyga
- †Paraceraurus
- †Parapilekia
- †Parasphaerexochus
- †Parayoungia
- †Parisoceraurus
- †Pateraspis
- †Patomaspis
- †Pilekia
- †Placoparina
- †Pompeckia
- †Proromma
- †Protocerauroides
- †Pseudocheirurus
- †Pseudopliomera
- †Pseudosphaerexochus
- †Radiurus
- †Ratinkaspis
- †Reraspis
- †Seisonia
- †Sinoparapilekia
- †Skelipyx
- †Sphaerexochus
- †Sphaerocoryphe
- †Stubblefieldia
- †Sycophantia
- †Tesselacauda
- †Tienshihfuia
- †Turantyx
- †Valongia
- †Victorispina
- †Whittakerites
- †Xylabion
- †Xystocrania
- †Yinaspis
- †Youngia
- †Zazvorkaspis
