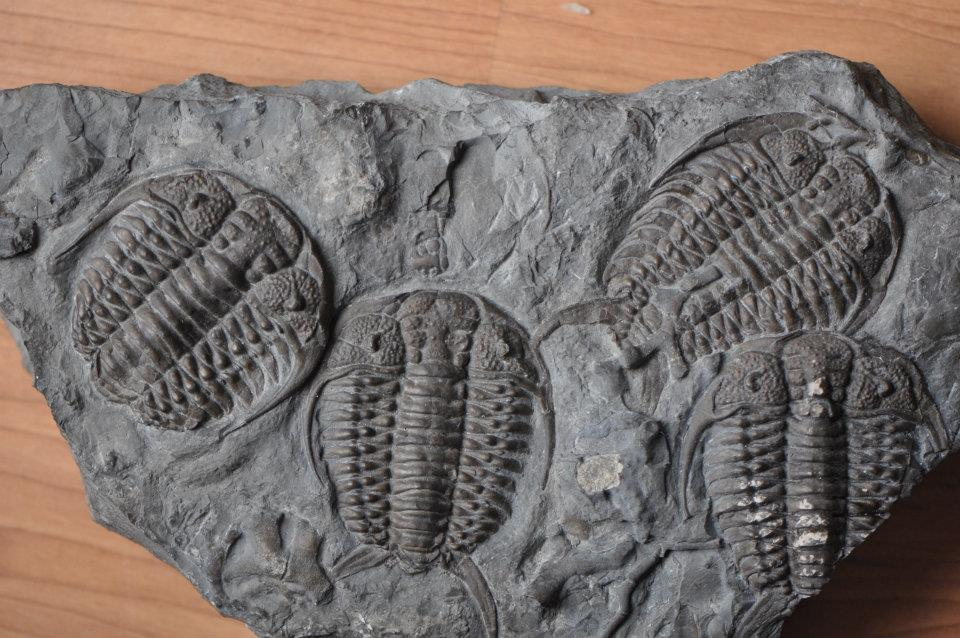

Scientific classification
- Domain: Eukaryota
- Kingdom: Animalia
- Phylum: Arthropoda
- Class: †Trilobita
- Order: †Phacopida
- Family: †Cheiruridae
- Genus: †Gabriceraurus; Pribyl & Vanek in Pribyl et al., 1985

= Gabriceraurus =

Genus of trilobites

Gabriceraurus is a trilobite in the order Phacopida (family Cheiruridae), that existed during the upper Ordovician in what is now Canada. It was described by Pribyl and Vanek in 1985, and the type species is Gabriceraurus gabrielsi, which was originally described under the genus Ceraurus by Ludvigsen in 1979. The type locality was the Esbataottine Formation in the Northwest Territories.
