= Actinopeltis =

Actinopeltis may refer to:

- Actinopeltis (fungus), a genus of fungi in the family Microthyriaceae
- Actinopeltis (trilobite), an extinct genus of trilobites in the family Cheiruridae
