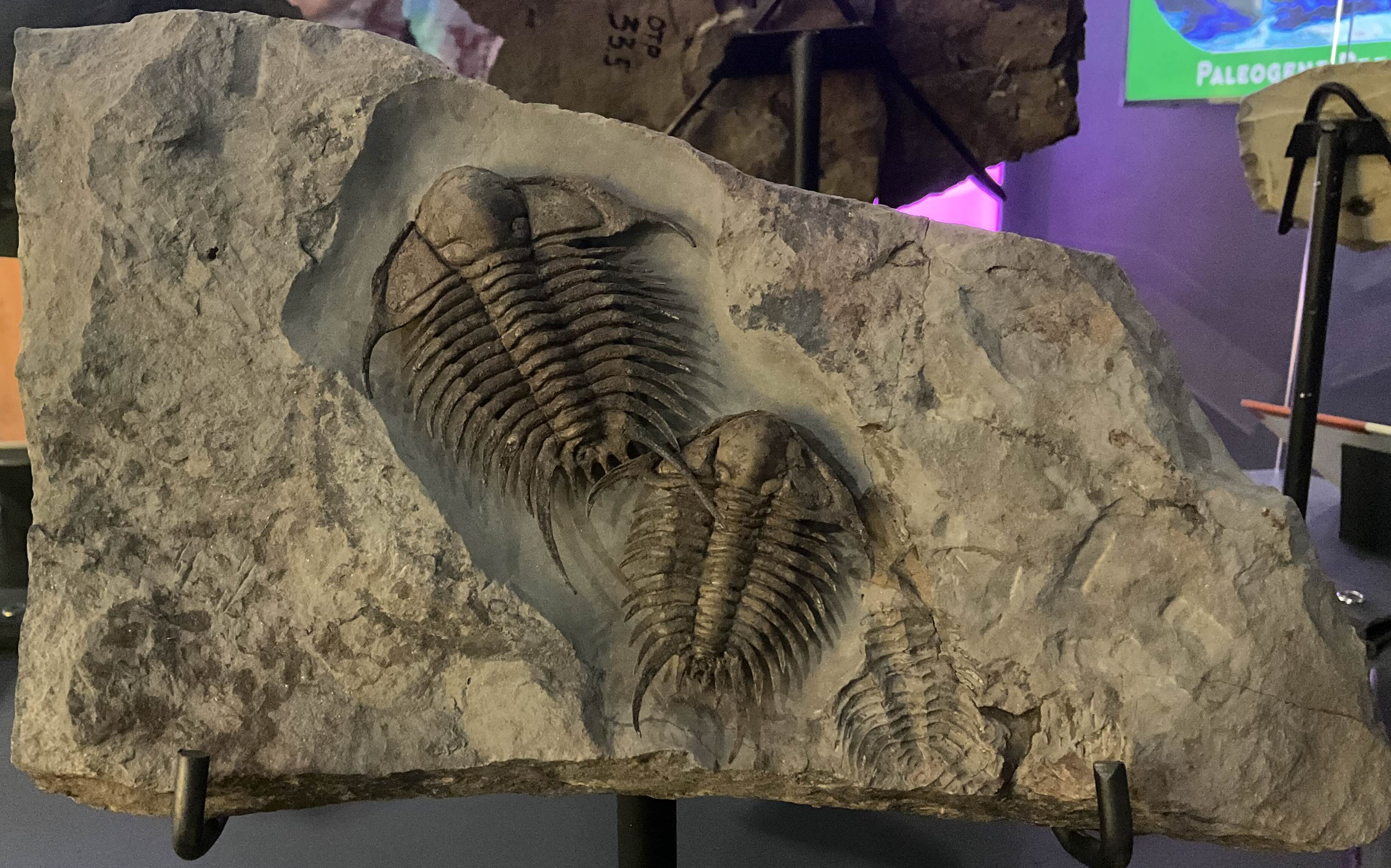
- Foulonia peregrina, from the Fezouata Formation, Morocco

Scientific classification
- Domain: Eukaryota
- Kingdom: Animalia
- Phylum: Arthropoda
- Class: †Trilobita
- Order: †Phacopida
- Family: †Cheiruridae
- Genus: †Foulonia; Pribyl & Vanek in Pribyl et al., 1985

= Foulonia =

Extinct genus of trilobites

Foulonia is a genus of trilobites in the order Phacopida, that existed during the lower Ordovician in what is now France. It was described by Pribyl and Vanek in 1985, and the type species is Foulonia peregrinus, which was originally described under the genus Ceraurinella by Dean in 1966. The type locality was on Montagne Noire.
