= Cerauromeros =

Scientific classification
- Domain: Eukaryota
- Kingdom: Animalia
- Phylum: Arthropoda
- Class: †Trilobita
- Order: †Phacopida
- Family: †Cheiruridae
- Genus: †Cerauromeros; Pribyl & Vanek in Pribyl et al., 1985

Genus of trilobites

Cerauromeros is a genus of trilobites in the order Phacopida that existed in what is now Illinois, U.S.A. It was described by Pribyl and Vanek in 1985, and the type species is Cerauromeros hydei, which was originally described under the genus Ceraurus by Weller in 1907.
