= Forteyops =

Scientific classification
- Domain: Eukaryota
- Kingdom: Animalia
- Phylum: Arthropoda
- Class: †Trilobita
- Order: †Phacopida
- Family: †Cheiruridae
- Genus: †Forteyops; Pribyl & Vanek in Pribyl et al., 1985

Extinct genus of trilobites

Forteyops is a genus of trilobites in the order Phacopida, that existed during the lower Ordovician in what is now the United States. It was described by Pribyl and Vanek in 1985, and the type species is Forteyops sexapugia, which was originally described under the genus Kawina by Ross in 1951. The type locality was the Garden City Formation in Utah.
