= Eccoptochiloides =

Scientific classification
- Domain: Eukaryota
- Kingdom: Animalia
- Phylum: Arthropoda
- Class: †Trilobita
- Order: †Phacopida
- Family: †Cheiruridae
- Genus: †Eccoptochiloides; Prantl & Pribyl, 1947

Extinct genus of trilobites

Eccoptochiloides is a genus of trilobites in the order Phacopida, that existed during the upper Ordovician in what is now the Czech Republic. It was described by Prantl and Pribyl in 1947, and the type species is Eccoptochiloides tumescens, which was originally described under the genus Cheirurus by Barrande in 1852. The type locality was the Vinice Formation.
