= Crotalocephalides =

Scientific classification
- Domain: Eukaryota
- Kingdom: Animalia
- Phylum: Arthropoda
- Class: †Trilobita
- Order: †Phacopida
- Family: †Cheiruridae
- Genus: †Crotalocephalides; Alberti, 1967

Genus of trilobites

Crotalocephalides is a genus of trilobites in the order Phacopida, that existed during the lower Devonian in what is now Germany. It was described by Alberti in 1967, and the type species is Crotalocephalides gaertneri, which the author had originally described under the genus Cheirurus in 1962. The type specimen was described from Ebersdorf, Upper Franconia.
