= Ceraurinium =

Scientific classification
- Domain: Eukaryota
- Kingdom: Animalia
- Phylum: Arthropoda
- Class: †Trilobita
- Order: †Phacopida
- Family: †Cheiruridae
- Genus: †Ceraurinium; Pribyl & Vanek in Pribyl et al., 1985

Extinct genus of trilobites

Ceraurinium is a genus of trilobites in the order Phacopida that existed during the upper Ordovician of what is now Poland. It was described by Pribyl and Vanek in 1985, and the type species is Ceraurinium intermedius, which was originally described under the genus Ceraurus by Kielan in 1955. It was described from the Holy Cross Mountains.
