= Heliomeroides =

Scientific classification
- Domain: Eukaryota
- Kingdom: Animalia
- Phylum: Arthropoda
- Class: †Trilobita
- Order: †Phacopida
- Family: †Cheiruridae
- Genus: †Heliomeroides; Evitt, 1951

Genus of trilobites

Heliomeroides is a trilobite in the order Phacopida (family Cheiruridae), that existed during the upper Ordovician in what is now the United States. It was described by Evitt in 1951, and the type species is Heliomeroides teres. The type locality was the Lincolnshire Formation in Virginia.

== Species ==
- Heliomeroides alacer Whittington, 1963
- Heliomeroides evitti Baldis & Pothe, 1995
- Heliomeroides freschaufae Chatterton, 1980
- Heliomeroides raymondi (Bradley, 1930) - Originally assigned to Heliomera, and later moved to its current genus by Evitt in 1951.
- Heliomeroides teres Evitt, 1951 - Type species.
- Heliomeroides treta Evitt, 1951
