= Cerauropeltis =

Scientific classification
- Domain: Eukaryota
- Kingdom: Animalia
- Phylum: Arthropoda
- Class: †Trilobita
- Order: †Phacopida
- Family: †Cheiruridae
- Genus: †Cerauropeltis; Pribyl & Vanek in Pribyl et al., 1985

Extinct genus of trilobites

Cerauropeltis is a genus of trilobites in the order Phacopida that existed during the upper Ordovician of what is now New York, U.S.A. It was described by Pribyl and Vanek in 1985, and the type species is Cerauropeltis ruedemanni, which was originally described under the genus Ceraurus by Raymond in 1916. It was described from the Valcour Formation.
