= Courtessolium =

Scientific classification
- Domain: Eukaryota
- Kingdom: Animalia
- Phylum: Arthropoda
- Class: †Trilobita
- Order: †Phacopida
- Family: †Cheiruridae
- Genus: †Courtessolium; Pribyl & Vanek in Pribyl et al., 1985

Genus of trilobites

Courtessolium is a genus of trilobites in the order Phacopida that existed during the lower Ordovician in what is now France. It was described by Pribyl and Vanek in 1985, and the type species is Courtessolium prepater, which was originally described under the genus Pateraspis by Courtessole and Pillet in 1975, and was later renamed under the genus Pseudosphaerexochus. The new generic name, Courtessolium, honours one of the original authors of the species.

It was described from the Tremadoc erratic in Hérault.
