= Bufoceraurus =

Scientific classification
- Domain: Eukaryota
- Kingdom: Animalia
- Phylum: Arthropoda
- Class: †Trilobita
- Order: †Phacopida
- Family: †Cheiruridae
- Genus: †Bufoceraurus; Hessin, 1989

Genus of trilobites

Bufoceraurus is an extinct genus of trilobites.
