= Bornholmaspis =

Bornholmaspis Temporal range: 471.8–468.1 Ma

Scientific classification
- Kingdom: Animalia
- Phylum: Arthropoda
- Clade: †Artiopoda
- Class: †Trilobita
- Order: †Phacopida
- Family: †Cheiruridae
- Genus: †Bornholmaspis; Přibyl & Vaněk, 1983

Extinct genus of trilobites

Bornholmaspis is a genus of trilobites in the order Phacopida, which existed in what is now Bornholm, Denmark. It was described by Přibyl and Vaněk in 1983, and the type species is Bornholmaspis inflatus, which was originally described as Pseudosphaerexochus inflatus, and later as Pateraspis inflatus by Poulsen in 1965.
