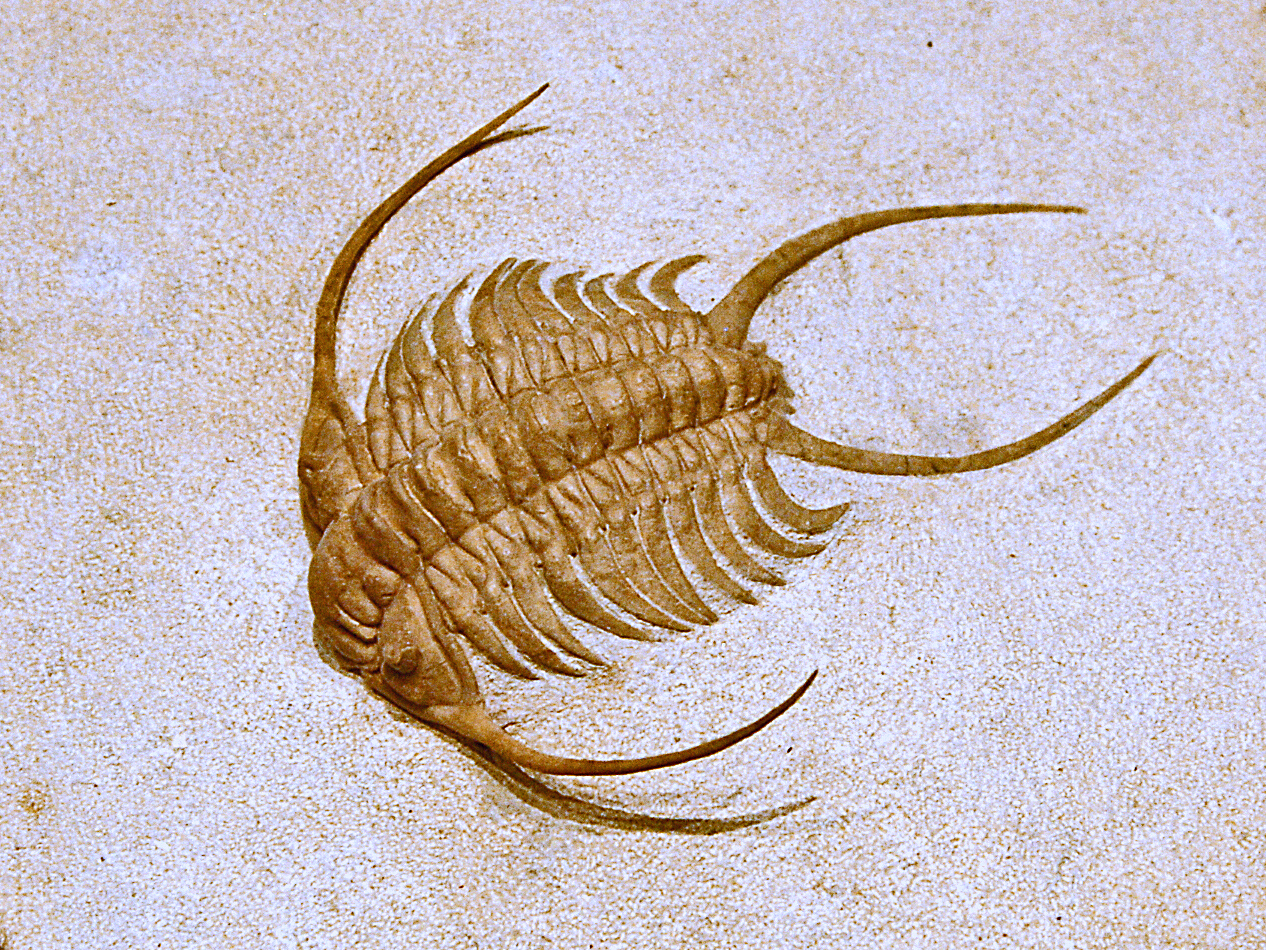
- Paraceraurus exsul

Scientific classification
- Domain: Eukaryota
- Kingdom: Animalia
- Phylum: Arthropoda
- Class: †Trilobita
- Order: †Phacopida
- Family: †Cheiruridae
- Genus: †Paraceraurus; Männil, 1958

= Paraceraurus =

Paraceraurus Temporal range: Ordovician

Genus of trilobites

Paraceraurus is a genus of trilobites that lived in the Ordovician period (485.4 to 443.4 Ma). Its remains have been found in China, Estonia, Sweden and North America. These trilobites have a rounded and moderately convex cephalon. Glabella is convex or flattened, with a sub-rectangular outline. Thorax shows eleven segments.

== Selected species ==
- Paraceraurus aculeatus
- Paraceraurus exsul
- Paraceraurus gladiator
- Paraceraurus ingricus
- Paraceraurus macrophthalmus
- Paraceraurus spinulosus
