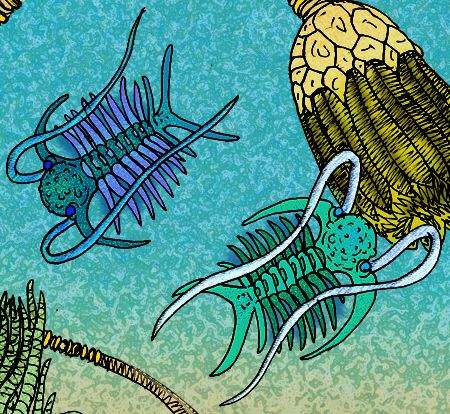
- Deiphon forbesi type species (left) & D. barrandei (right)

Scientific classification
- Domain: Eukaryota
- Kingdom: Animalia
- Phylum: Arthropoda
- Class: †Trilobita
- Order: †Phacopida
- Family: †Cheiruridae
- Genus: †Deiphon; Barrande, 1850

Type species
- Deiphon forbesi

Species
- D. americanus D. barrandei D. brabrooki D. dikella D. fleur D. forbesi D. grovesi D. pisum D. salmoni

= Deiphon =

Deiphon Temporal range: Silurian

Genus of trilobites

Deiphon is a distinctive genus of Silurian phacopid trilobites of the family Cheiruridae found in Western and Central Europe, and in Central and Eastern United States. The type species, D. forbesi, from England, Bohemia, and Sweden, was discovered and described by the French paleontologist, Joachim Barrande in 1850.

== Description ==
The glabella was inflated, and globular-shaped, and covered in small wart-like bumps. If it was filled with fat, or oil, the glabellum would have helped to have made the creature positively buoyant. On the other hand, trilobites with large glabellae are often suspected of being predatory, as the volume of glabella would be filled with digestive organs, or used to store captured/swallowed prey. The free cheeks of the cephalon formed a pair of long, curved spines, and the segments of the pleural lobes were separated and elongated to form rib-like struts. These modifications, along with the V-shaped pygidium give these trilobites a cartoon "fish-skeleton" appearance. The defensive value of these highly elongate spines is also apparent, as they would have stuck in the throats of vertebrate predators, such as the Silurian acanthodian Nostolepis.

Each species differed from each other in the sizes of their glabella, as well as the size and curves of the pygidium and free cheek spines.

Cheirurids had the ability to enroll to protect their softer ventral area, and the spines would have thrust upward and outward. In all adult specimens of the genus, the body has up to nine segments, not including the cephalon or pygidium (which is formed from at least two fused and reduced segments).

== Ecology ==
Because some of the other highly derived cheirurid trilobites, such as the Devonian Crotalocephalus and Cybelloides of the Ordovician, have been interpreted as being swimmers or plankters, the species of Deiphon have been popularly thought of as being planktonic, as well. Mostly, it is due to the idea that its globular glabellum was filled with fat or oil, thus, serving as a balloon to keep it in the water column, and its elongated pleural lobes serving to keep it from sinking. If it were a nektonic or planktonic trilobite, the spherical glabellum, coupled with its rib cage-like pleural lobes and spine-like cephalon cheeks would have presented serious impediments to its hydrodynamic ability, and would have been either a drifter, or a very leisurely swimmer, feeding on phytoplankton, or slow-moving zooplankton.

On the other hand, because of Deiphon's questionable hydrodynamics, and relatively tiny eyes (as opposed to the tremendous eyes normally found on other swimming or planktonic trilobites), some think of it as being a benthic predator that scurried on top of the substrate in search of prey, only swimming when necessary (such as evading larger predators). It may have even used its enormous glabellum to store subdued prey for later digestion.
