= Hammannopyge =

Scientific classification
- Domain: Eukaryota
- Kingdom: Animalia
- Phylum: Arthropoda
- Class: †Trilobita
- Order: †Phacopida
- Family: †Cheiruridae
- Genus: †Hammannopyge; Pribyl & Vanek in Pribyl et al., 1985

Genus of trilobites

Hammannopyge is a genus of trilobites in the order Phacopida (family Cheiruridae), that existed during the upper Ordovician in what is now Scotland. It was described by Pribyl and Vanek in 1985, and the type species is Hammanopyge unica, which was originally described under the genus Acidaspis by Thomson in 1857. The type locality was the Balclatchie Formation.
