= Hapsiceraurus =

Scientific classification
- Domain: Eukaryota
- Kingdom: Animalia
- Phylum: Arthropoda
- Class: †Trilobita
- Order: †Phacopida
- Family: †Cheiruridae
- Genus: †Hapsiceraurus; Whittington, 1954

Genus of trilobites

Hapsiceraurus is a genus of trilobites in the order Phacopida (family Cheiruridae) that existed during the upper Ordovician in what is now Canada. It was described by Whittington in 1954, and the type species is Hapsiceraurus hispidus (type specimen: USNM 28169a). The type locality was on Baffin Island, in Nunavut.
