= Chiozoon =

Scientific classification
- Domain: Eukaryota
- Kingdom: Animalia
- Phylum: Arthropoda
- Class: †Trilobita
- Order: †Phacopida
- Family: †Cheiruridae
- Genus: †Chiozoon; Lane, 1972

Genus of trilobites

Chiozoon is a cheirurid phacopid trilobite that existed during the lower Silurian of what is now northeastern Greenland. It was described by Philip D. Lane in 1972, and the type species is Chiozoon cowiei.
