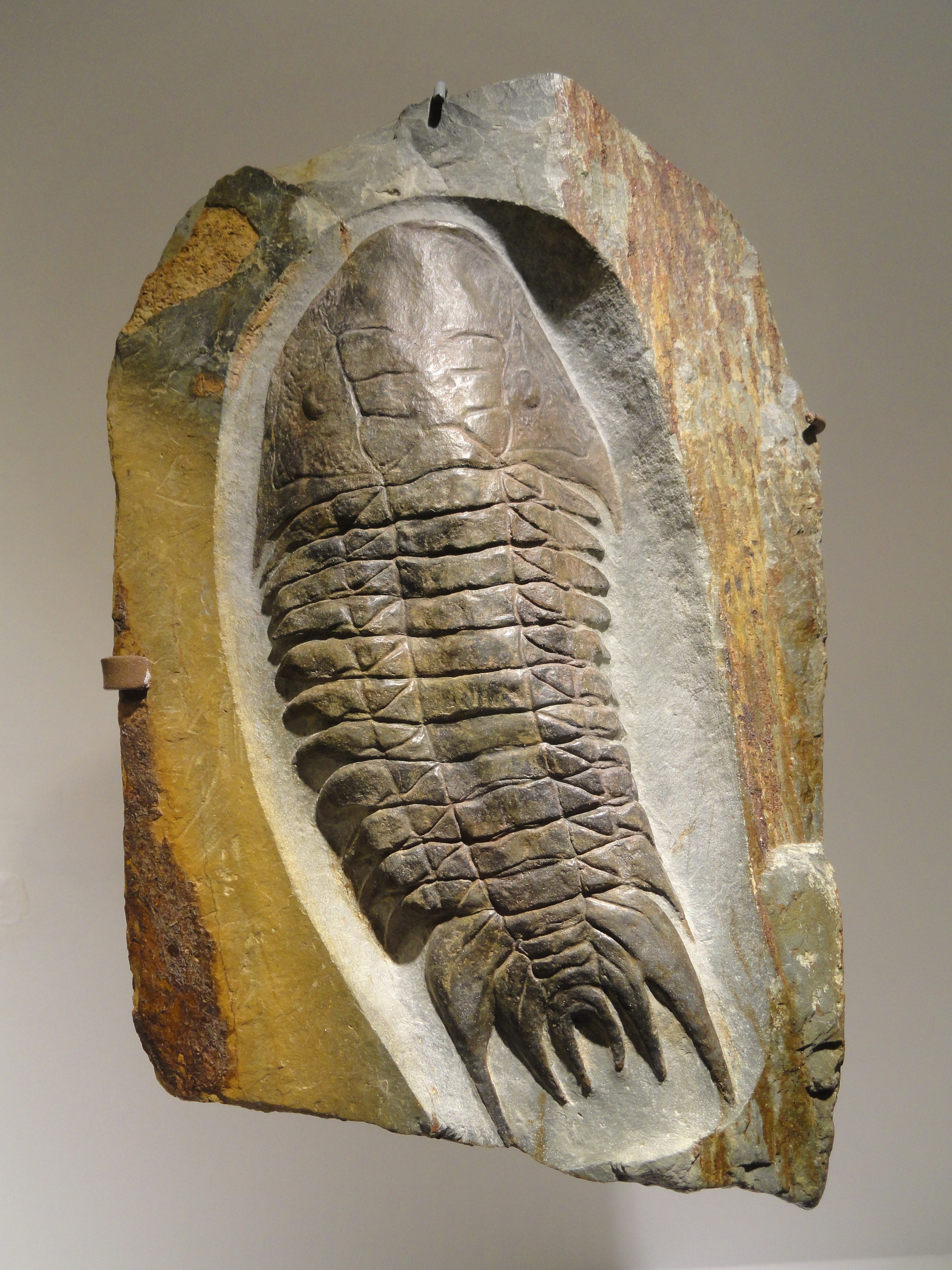
- Didrepanon barrowi

Scientific classification
- Kingdom: Animalia
- Phylum: Arthropoda
- Clade: †Artiopoda
- Class: †Trilobita
- Order: †Phacopida
- Family: †Cheiruridae
- Genus: †Didrepanon; Lane, 1971

= Didrepanon =

Genus of trilobites

Didrepanon is a trilobite in the order Phacopida, that existed during the upper Silurian in what is now England. It was described by Philip D. Lane in 1971, and the type species is Didrepanon falcatum. The type locality was in Sedgley.
