= Crotalocephalina =

Crotalocephalina Temporal range: Devonian

Scientific classification
- Domain: Eukaryota
- Kingdom: Animalia
- Phylum: Arthropoda
- Class: †Trilobita
- Order: †Phacopida
- Family: †Cheiruridae
- Genus: †Crotalocephalina; Pribyl & Vanek, 1964

Genus of trilobites

Crotalocephalina is an extinct genus of trilobite in the order Phacopida found in Morocco.
