= Contracheirurus =

Scientific classification
- Domain: Eukaryota
- Kingdom: Animalia
- Phylum: Arthropoda
- Class: †Trilobita
- Order: †Phacopida
- Family: †Cheiruridae
- Genus: †Contracheirurus; Hatterton & Perry, 1984

Genus of trilobites

Contracheirurus is a trilobite in the order Phacopida that existed during the lower Silurian of what is now the Northwest Territories of Canada. It was described by Hatterton and Perry in 1984, and the type species is Contracheirurus zuvegesi.
