= Eocheirurus =

Scientific classification
- Kingdom: Animalia
- Phylum: Arthropoda
- Clade: †Artiopoda
- Class: †Trilobita
- Order: †Phacopida
- Family: †Cheiruridae
- Genus: †Eocheiurus; Rozova, 1960

Extinct genus of trilobites

Eocheiurus is a genus of trilobites in the order Phacopida, that existed during the upper Cambrian in what is now Russia. It was described by Rozova in 1960, and the type species is Eocheirurus salairicus. The species epithet is derived from the name of the town, Salair, in which the type locality, the Tolstochikhin Formation, is located.
