= Diaphanometopus =

Diaphanometopus Temporal range: Lower Ordovician

Scientific classification
- Domain: Eukaryota
- Kingdom: Animalia
- Phylum: Arthropoda
- Class: †Trilobita
- Order: †Phacopida
- Family: †Diaphanometopidae
- Genus: †Diaphanometopus; Schmidt, 1881

Species
- D. volborthi Schmidt, 1881

Genus of trilobites

Diaphanometopus is an extinct genus of trilobite in the order Phacopida. It is known from the Lower Ordovician of Russia (Oeland series, Pavlovsk).
