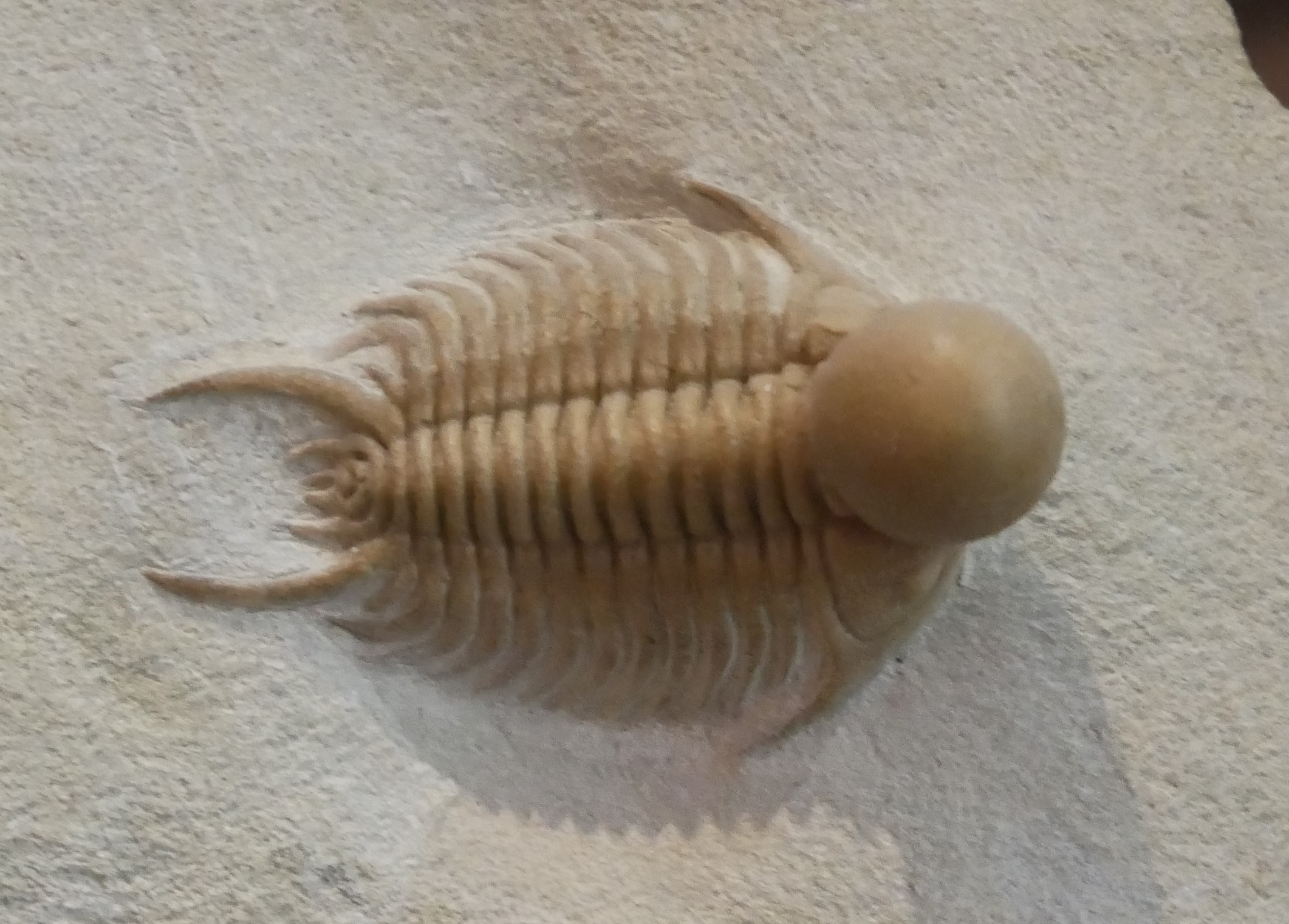

Scientific classification
- Domain: Eukaryota
- Kingdom: Animalia
- Phylum: Arthropoda
- Class: †Trilobita
- Order: †Phacopida
- Family: †Cheiruridae
- Genus: †Sphaerocoryphe; Angelin, 1854

Species
- Sphaerocoryphe atlantiades Öpik, 1937; Sphaerocoryphe cranium Kutorga, 1854; Sphaerocoryphe dentata Angelin, 1854; Sphaerocoryphe erratica Männil, 1958; Sphaerocoryphe punctata Angelin, 1854; Sphaerocoryphe schmidti Männil, 1958

= Sphaerocoryphe =

Sphaerocoryphe Temporal range: Middle Ordovician–Silurian

Genus of trilobites

Sphaerocoryphe is a genus of trilobite that lived from the middle Ordovician to the Silurian. Its fossils have been found in Australia, Europe, and North America. Both Sphaerocoryphe and Hemisphaerocoryphe had a characteristically bulbous glabella, and the two may represent only one genus.
