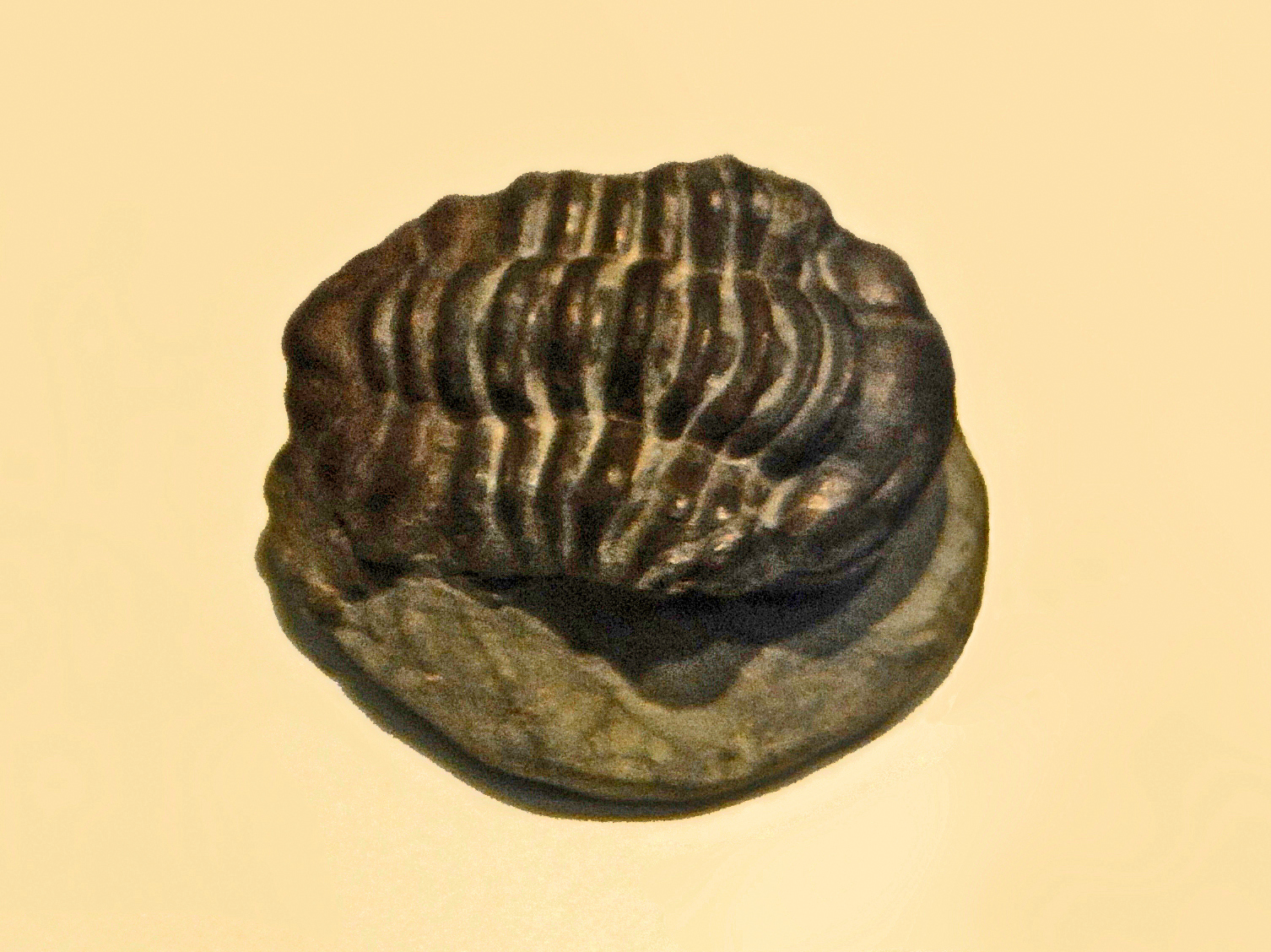
- Sphaerexochus mirus from Silurian

Scientific classification
- Domain: Eukaryota
- Kingdom: Animalia
- Phylum: Arthropoda
- Class: †Trilobita
- Order: †Phacopida
- Family: †Cheiruridae
- Genus: †Sphaerexochus; Beyrich, 1845

= Sphaerexochus =

Sphaerexochus Temporal range: Middle Ordovician to Late Silurian

Genus of trilobites

Sphaerexochus is a genus of trilobites from the Middle Ordovician to Late Silurian (468.1 to 418.7 Ma) of Asia, Australia, Europe, and North America.

The type species of the genus is Sphaerexochus mirus Beyrich 1845 (syn. of Sphaerexochus calvus Mc Coy 1846) . Similar and related genus is Pseudosphaerexochus.

== Species ==
- Sphaerexochus arenosis Chatterton and Ludvigsen 1977
- Sphaerexochus arenosus Chatterton and Ludvigsen 1976
- Sphaerexochus atacius Ludvigsen 1979
- Sphaerexochus brandlyi Chatterton and Perry 1984
- Sphaerexochus bridgei Cooper and Kindle 1936
- Sphaerexochus britanicus Dean 1971
- Sphaerexochus calvus Mc Coy 1846
- Sphaerexochus dimorphus Whittington and Evitt 1953
- Sphaerexochus eurys Tripp 1962
- Sphaerexochus fibrisulcatus Lu 1975
- Sphaerexochus glaber Holloway 1980
- Sphaerexochus hapsidotus Whittington and Evitt 1953
- Sphaerexochus hiratai Kobayashi and Hamada 1964
- Sphaerexochus hisingeri Warburg 1925
- Sphaerexochus johnstoni Chatterton and Perry 1984
- Sphaerexochus laciniatus Lindström 1885
- Sphaerexochus latifrons Angelin 1854
- Sphaerexochus molongloensis Chatterton and Campbell 1980
- Sphaerexochus parvus Billings 1865
- Sphaerexochus pulcher Whittington and Evitt 1953
- Sphaerexochus romingeri Hall 1868
- Sphaerexochus scabridus Angelin 1854
- Sphaerexochus tuberculatus Warburg 1925
- Sphaerexochus valcourensis Shaw and Bolton 2011
