= Sycophantia =

Sycophantia Temporal range: Late Arenig

Scientific classification
- Kingdom: Animalia
- Phylum: Arthropoda
- Clade: †Artiopoda
- Class: †Trilobita
- Order: †Phacopida
- Family: †Cheiruridae
- Genus: †Sycophantia; Fortey, 1980

Extinct genus of arthropods (fossil)

Sycophantia is an extinct genus from a well-known class of fossil marine arthropods, the trilobites. It lived during the later part of the Arenig stage of the Ordovician Period, approximately 478 to 471 million years ago.
