= Demeterops =

Scientific classification
- Kingdom: Animalia
- Phylum: Arthropoda
- Clade: †Artiopoda
- Class: †Trilobita
- Order: †Phacopida
- Family: †Pilekiidae
- Genus: †Demeterops; Pribyl & Vanek, in Pribyl et al., 1985

Genus of trilobites

Demeterops is a genus of trilobites in the order Phacopida, that existed during the lower Ordovician in what is now the United States. It was described by Pribyl and Vanek in 1985, and the type species is Demeterops loella, which was originally described as a dubious species in the genus Pilekia by Demeter, in 1973. The new generic name honours the species' original author. The type locality was the Fillmore Formation in Utah.
