= Areia bohemica =

Areia bohemica Temporal range: 466.0–445.6 Ma

Scientific classification
- Domain: Eukaryota
- Kingdom: Animalia
- Phylum: Arthropoda
- Class: †Trilobita
- Order: †Phacopida
- Family: †Cheiruridae
- Genus: †Areia; Barrande, 1872
- Species: †A. bohemica

Binomial name
- †Areia bohemica Barrande, 1868

Species of trilobite

Areia is a genus of cheirurid phacopid trilobite which existed during the Ordovician in what is now the Czech Republic. It was described by Barrande in 1872, and the type and only species is Areia bohemica.
