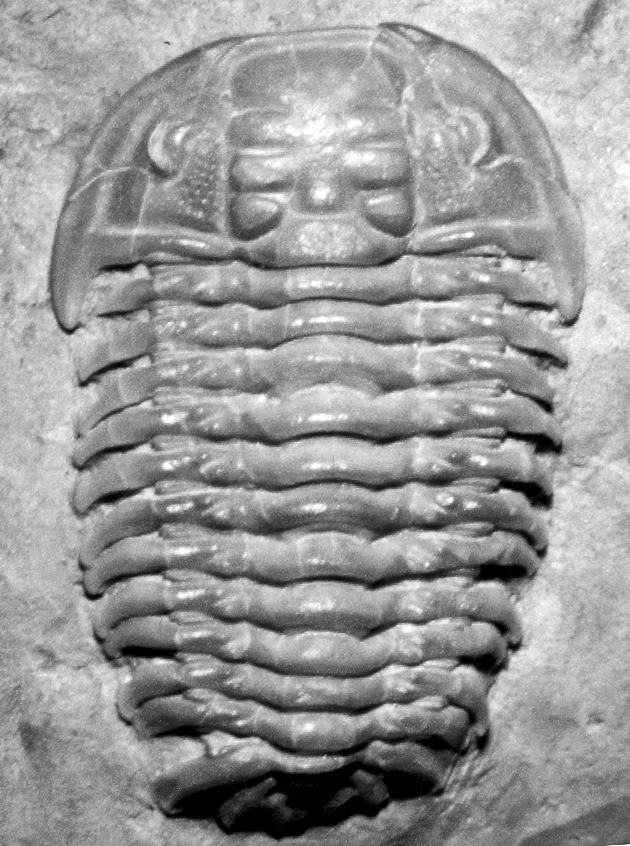
- Ceraurinus icarus fossil

Scientific classification
- Domain: Eukaryota
- Kingdom: Animalia
- Phylum: Arthropoda
- Class: †Trilobita
- Order: †Phacopida
- Family: †Cheiruridae
- Genus: †Ceraurinus; Barton, 1913

= Ceraurinus =

Genus of trilobites

Ceraurinus is an extinct genus of trilobite in the order Phacopida.
