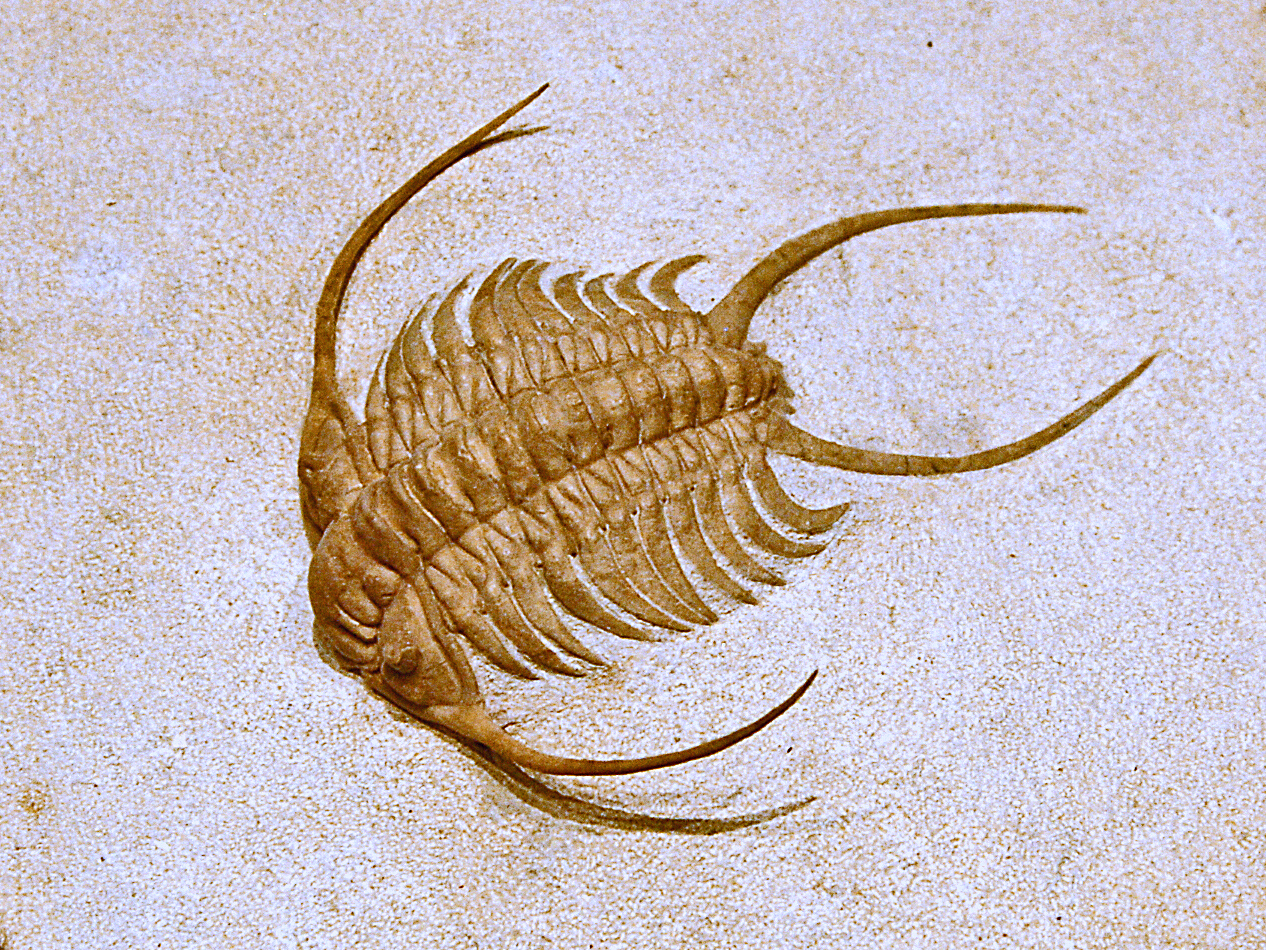

Scientific classification
- Kingdom: Animalia
- Phylum: Arthropoda
- Clade: †Artiopoda
- Class: †Trilobita
- Order: †Phacopida
- Family: †Cheiruridae
- Genus: †Paraceraurus
- Species: †P. exsul

Binomial name
- †Paraceraurus exsul (Beyrich, 1846)

Synonyms
- Cheirurus exsul Beyrich, 1846, Cheirurus exsul Schmidt, 1881, Cheirurus exsul Beyr. Schmidt, 1907; Paraceraurus exsul (Beyrich, 1846)

= Paraceraurus exsul =

Paraceraurus exsul Temporal range: Middle Ordovician

Species of trilobite

Paraceraurus exsul is a species of trilobite that lived in St. Petersburg Region and Tver Region (in erratic blocks) of Russia, Estonia, Finland (Åland, in erratic blocks), Sweden, North Germany (in erratic blocks), Lithuania and Belarus during the Upper Llanvirnian Stage (463.5-460.9 Ma) of the Middle Ordovician. These trilobites can reach a length of about 16 centimetres (6.3 in). They show a square front edge, large genal spines on the cheeks and characteristic long pygidial spines. Genal spines are curved usually inward and upward.
