= Anacheirurus =

Scientific classification
- Kingdom: Animalia
- Phylum: Arthropoda
- Clade: †Artiopoda
- Class: †Trilobita
- Order: †Phacopida
- Family: †Pilekiidae
- Genus: †Anacheirurus; Reed, 1896

Extinct genus of trilobites

Anacheirurus is a genus of trilobites. It was described by Reed in 1896, as a new genus for the species Cheirurus frederici, and was originally described by Salter in 1864.

== Species ==
- Anacheirurus asiaticus Petrunina, 1984
- Anacheirurus bohemicus (Ruzicka, 1926)
- Anacheirurus frederici (Salter, 1864)
- Anacheirurus plutonis Rushton, 1973
- Anacheirurus atecae Hamman, 1971
