= Borealaspis =

Scientific classification
- Domain: Eukaryota
- Kingdom: Animalia
- Phylum: Arthropoda
- Class: †Trilobita
- Order: †Phacopida
- Family: †Cheiruridae
- Genus: †Borealaspis; Ludvigsen, 1976

Genus of trilobites

Borealaspis is an extinct genus of trilobites. It contains two species, B. biformis, and B. whittakerensis.
