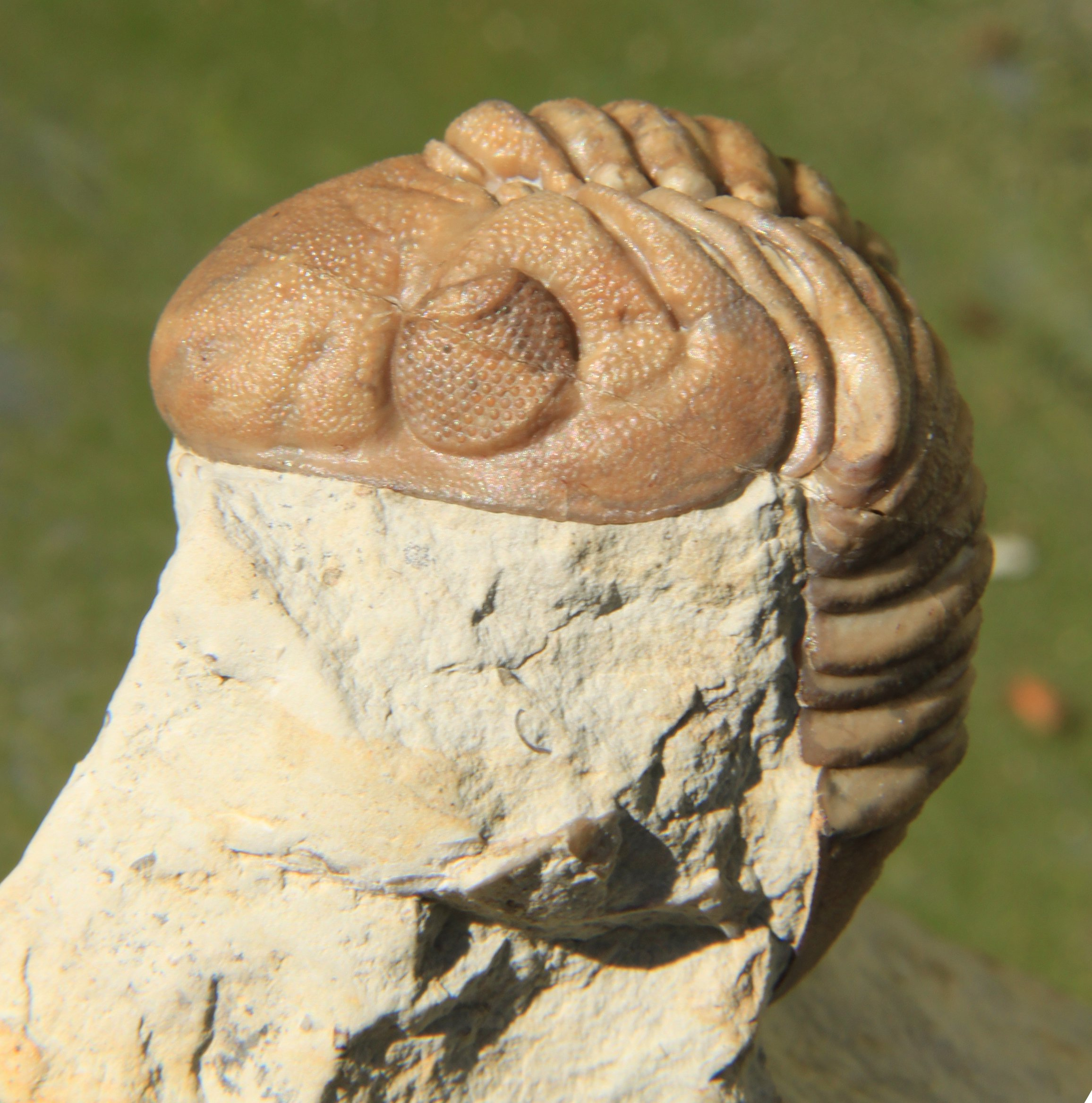
- Reedops deckeri, a trilobite of the suborder Phacopina

Scientific classification
- Kingdom: Animalia
- Phylum: Arthropoda
- Clade: †Artiopoda
- Class: †Trilobita
- Order: †Phacopida
- Suborder: †Phacopina; Struve, 1959

Superfamilies
- Acastoidea; Dalmanitoidea; Phacopoidea

= Phacopina =

Phacopina Temporal range: Tremadocian–Famennian

Extinct suborder of trilobites

The Phacopina comprise a suborder of the trilobite order Phacopida. Species belonging to the Phacopina lived from the Lower Ordovician (Tremadocian) through the end of the Upper Devonian (Famennian). The one unique feature that distinguishes Phacopina from all other trilobites are the very large, separately set lenses without a common cornea of the compound eye.

== Habitat ==
As far as currently known, all Phacopina species were marine bottom-dwellers.

== Origin ==
The Early Ordovician genus Gyrometopus (superfamily Dalmanitoidea, family Diaphanometopidae) is probably close to the common ancestor of the Phacopina. Gyrometopus is phacopid in appearance, but a rostral plate is present, unlike in other Phacopina. However, the rostral plate does not divide the cephalic doublure into a left and right section, but instead the rostral suture defines a semicircle in the frontal ¾ of the doublure.

== Description ==
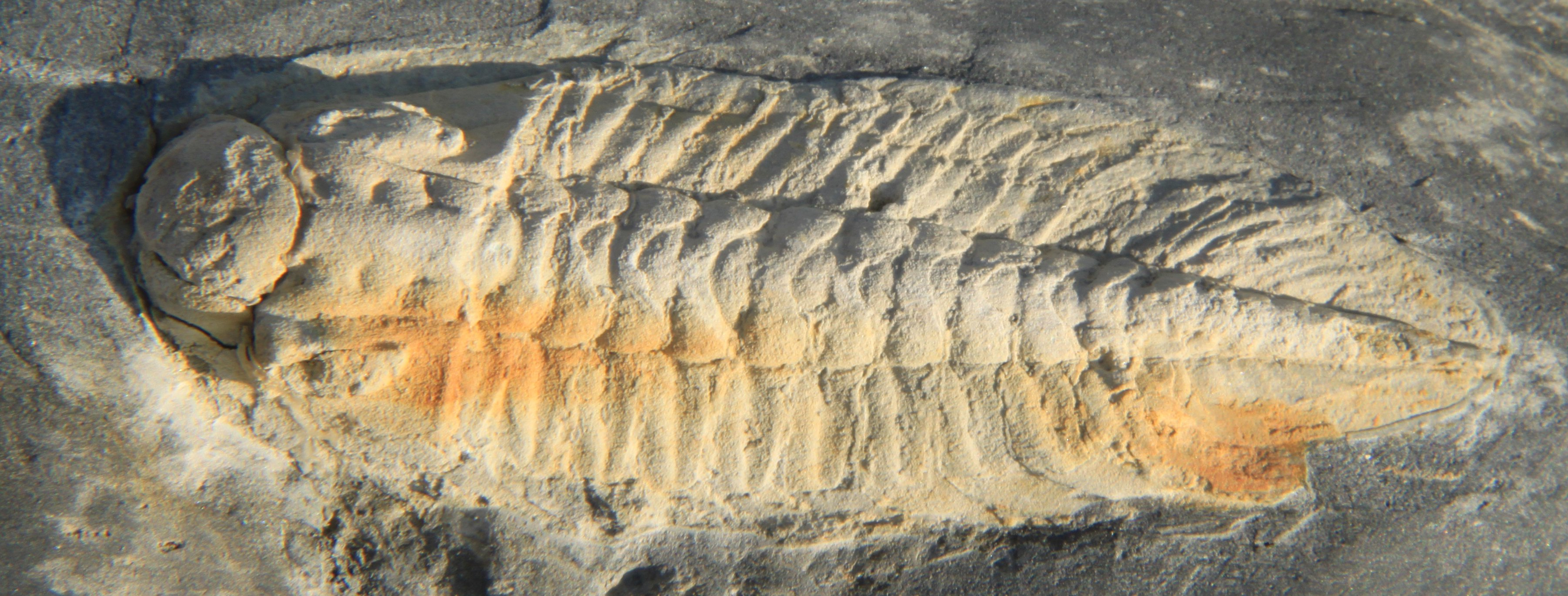
Zeliszkella torrubiae, a dalmanitid, exhibiting 10 thorax segments

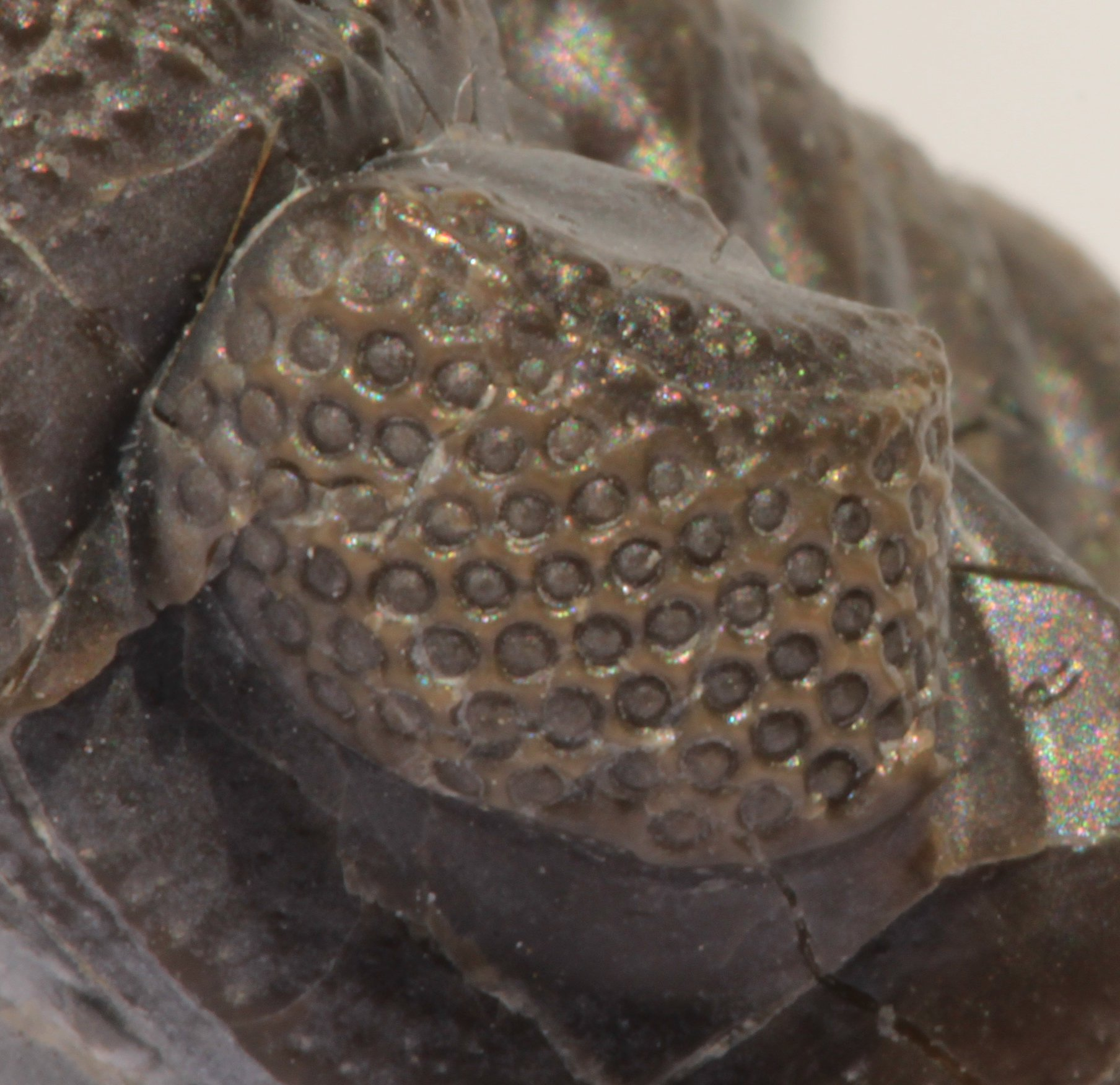
A schizochroal eye of Phacops rana, showing the large (0.5mm) individually set calcite lenses, that are unique in the animal kingdom

The eyes (if present) consist of very large (0.07mm in Tricopelta breviceps to 0.5mm in Phacops rana), separately set lenses without a common cornea (so called schizochroal eyes). However, some Phacopina species lack eyes, such as the species of the genus Ductina.

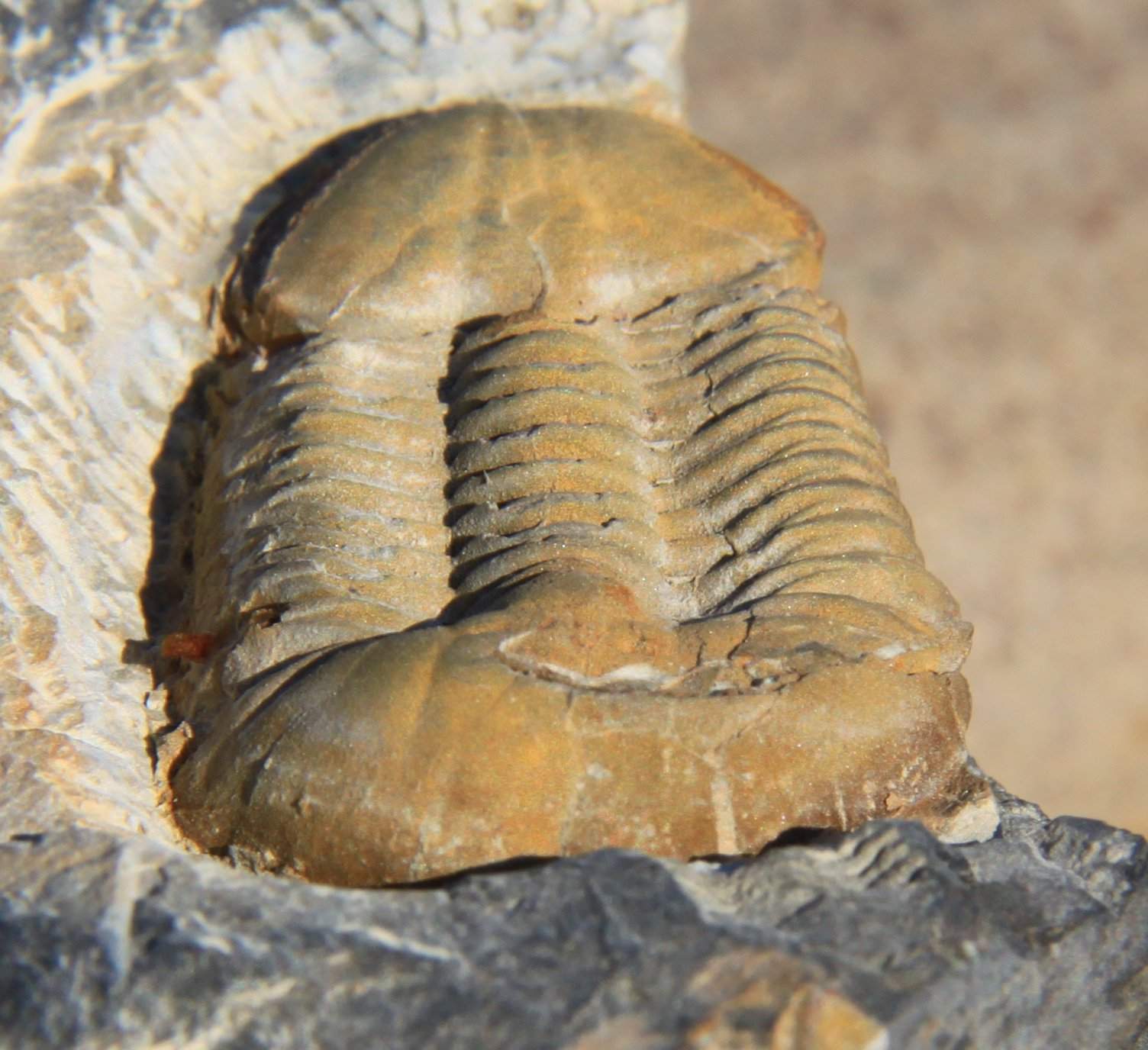
Ductina vietnamica, a phacopid that lacks eyes

The natural fracture lines (sutures) of the head run along the top edges of the compound eye. From the back of the eye these cut to the side of the head (proparian) and not to the back. In front of the eye, the right and left facial sutures connect in front of the inflated glabella and consequently the free cheeks (or librigenae) are yoked as a single piece. The part of the skeleton that is ‘tucked under’ (the doublure) has no sutures crossing it to form a rostral plate.
The thorax has 11 (rarely 10) segments, the side lobes (or pleurae) are furrowed, and the articulating facets distinct.

== Systematics ==
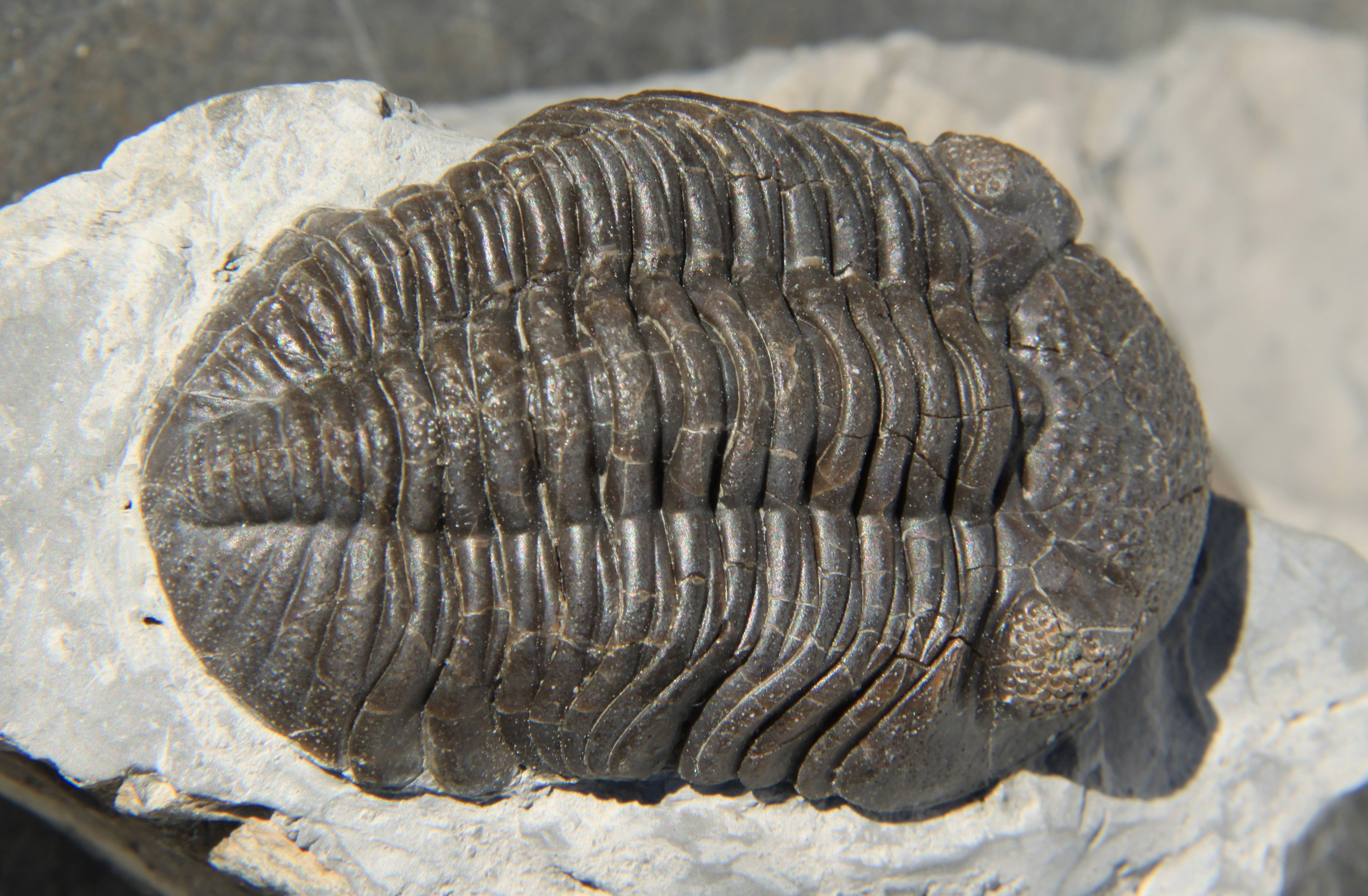
Phacops rana crassituberculata, example of the Phacopoidea superfamily. Note the almost complete merger of the glabella, and the effaced pygidium

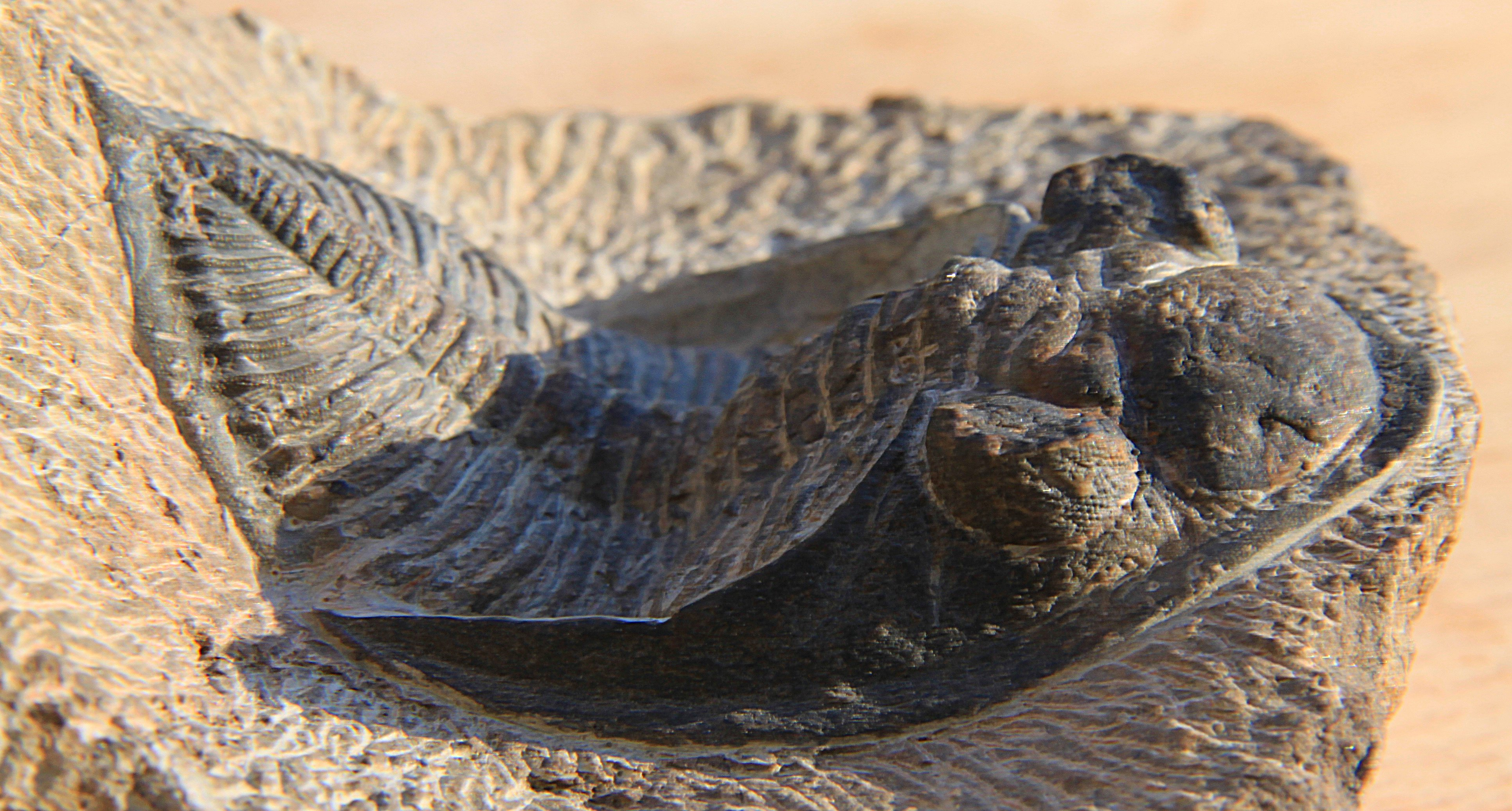
Odontochile sp., example of the Dalmanitoidea superfamily. Note the distinct terminal spine, axis and furrows in the pygidium.

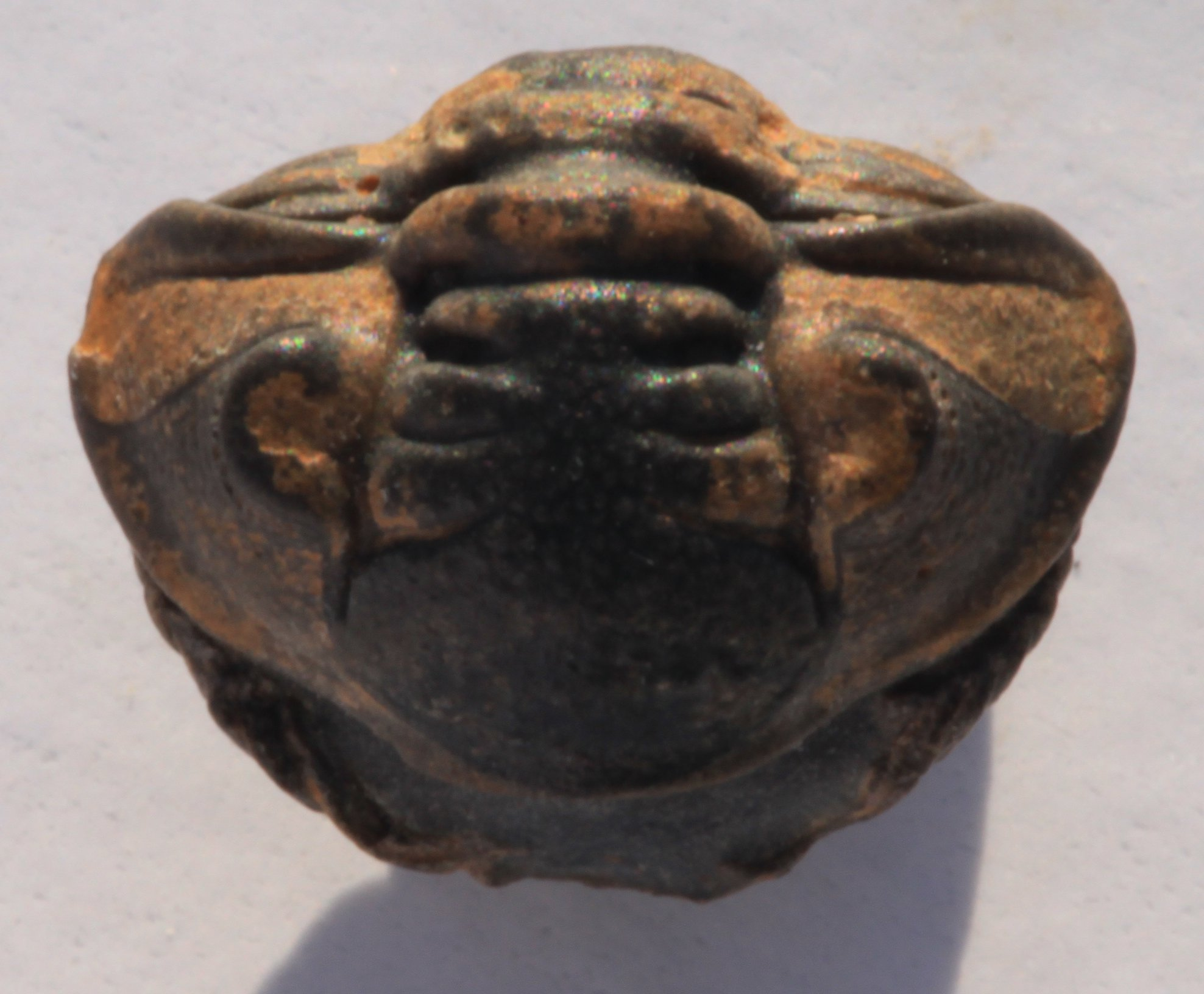
A roled-up Acastoides zguilmensis, example of the Acastoidea superfamily. Note the 3 pairs of glabellar lateral lobes.

The Phacopina contain 3 superfamilies and 7 families:

Superfamily Acastoidea

- Family Acastidae (examples: Coltraneia oufatenensis, Walliserops trifurcatus)
- Family Calmoniidae

Superfamily Dalmanitoidea

- Family Dalmanitidae (examples: Dalmanites limulurus, Huntoniatonia oklahomae)
- Family Diaphanometopidae
- Family Prosopiscidae

Superfamily Phacopoidea

- Family Phacopidae (examples: Phacops rana, Ductina vietnamica)
- Family Pterygometopidae
