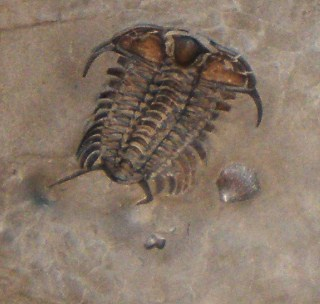
- Ceraurus pleurexanthemus (Cheiruridae)

Scientific classification
- Kingdom: Animalia
- Phylum: Arthropoda
- Clade: †Artiopoda
- Class: †Trilobita
- Order: †Phacopida
- Suborder: †Cheirurina

Families
- †Cheiruridae; †Encrinuridae; †Pilekiidae; †Pliomeridae

= Cheirurina =

Cheirurina Temporal range: Furongian–Givetian

Extinct suborder of trilobites

Cheirurina is a suborder of the trilobite order Phacopida. Known representatives range from the uppermost Cambrian (upper Furongian) to the end of the Middle Devonian (Givetian). Cheirurina is made up of a morphologically diverse group of related families.
