= Krattaspis =

Scientific classification
- Domain: Eukaryota
- Kingdom: Animalia
- Phylum: Arthropoda
- Class: †Trilobita
- Order: †Phacopida
- Family: †Cheiruridae
- Genus: †Krattaspis; Öpik, 1937

Genus of trilobites

Krattaspis is a genus of trilobites in the order Phacopida (family Cheiruridae), that existed during the lower Ordovician in what is now Estonia. It was described by Öpik in 1937, and the type species is Krattaspis viridatus. The type locality was the Maekula Strata.
