= Holia =

Scientific classification
- Domain: Eukaryota
- Kingdom: Animalia
- Phylum: Arthropoda
- Class: †Trilobita
- Order: †Phacopida
- Family: †Cheiruridae
- Genus: †Holia; Bradley, 1930

Genus of trilobites

Holia is an extinct genus of trilobite in the order Phacopida. It contains four species, H. cimelia, H. glabra, H. secristi, and H. anacantha.
