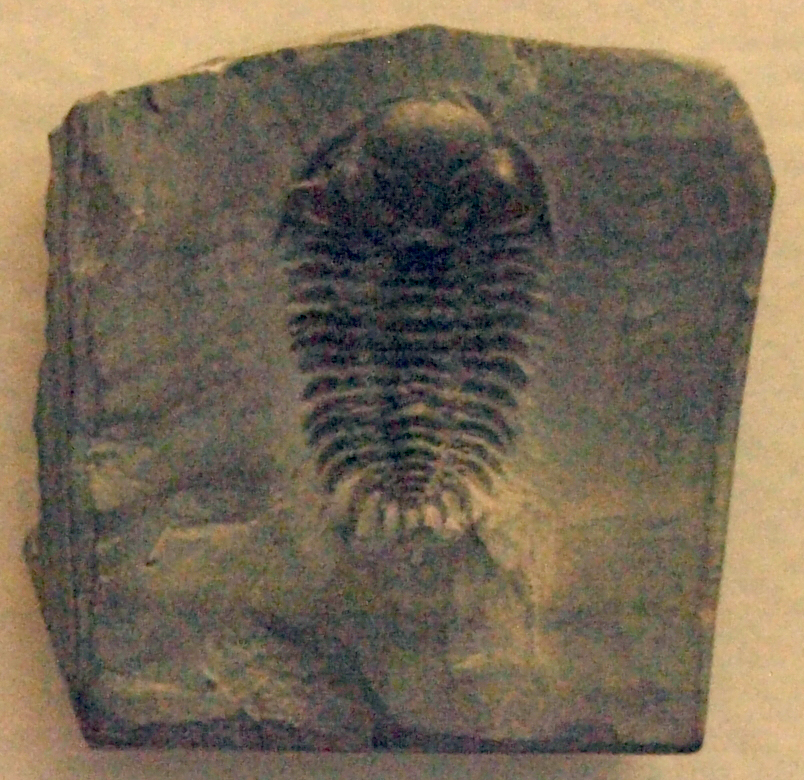
- Ktenoura retrospinosa, on display at the Natural History Museum, London

Scientific classification
- Domain: Eukaryota
- Kingdom: Animalia
- Phylum: Arthropoda
- Class: †Trilobita
- Order: †Phacopida
- Family: †Cheiruridae
- Genus: †Ktenoura; Lane, 1971

= Ktenoura =

Ktenoura Temporal range: Silurian

Genus of trilobites

Ktenoura is a genus of trilobites from the Silurian of Europe.
