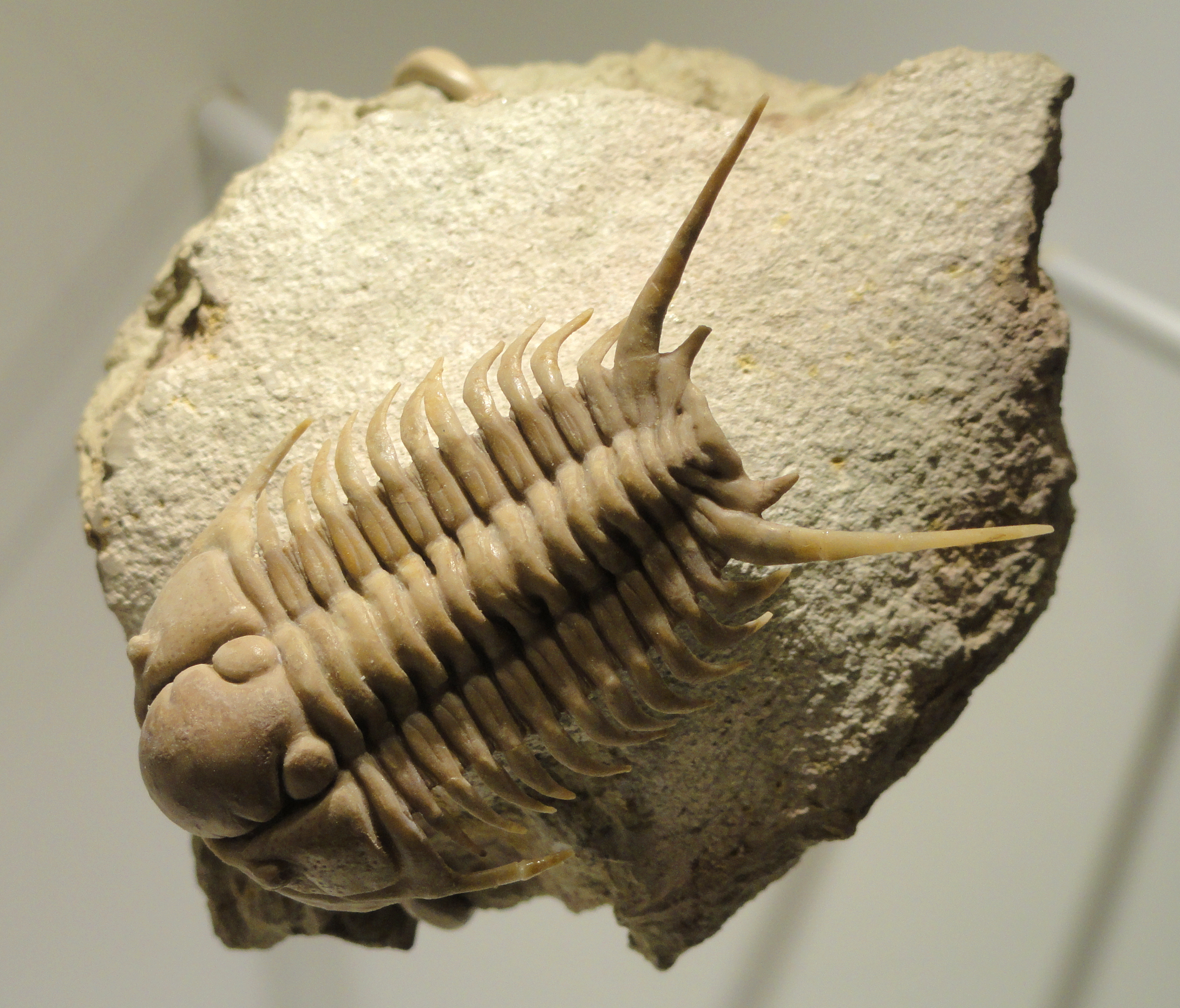
- Cyrtometopus sembnitzkii

Scientific classification
- Domain: Eukaryota
- Kingdom: Animalia
- Phylum: Arthropoda
- Class: †Trilobita
- Order: †Phacopida
- Family: †Cheiruridae
- Genus: †Cyrtometopus; Angelin, 1854

= Cyrtometopus =

Genus of trilobites

Cyrtometopus is an extinct genus of trilobite in the order Phacopida.

== Species ==
- Cyrtometopus affinis
- Cyrtometopus clavifrons
- Cyrtometopus meridianus
- Cyrtometopus sembnitzkii
