= Kawina (trilobite) =

Scientific classification
- Domain: Eukaryota
- Kingdom: Animalia
- Phylum: Arthropoda
- Class: †Trilobita
- Order: †Phacopida
- Family: †Cheiruridae
- Genus: †Kawina; Barton, 1915

Genus of trilobites

Kawina is an extinct genus of trilobites in the order Phacopida.

Species:

- Kawina arnoldi
- Kawina chazyensis
- Kawina divergens
- Kawina griphus
- Kawina limbata
- Kawina mercurius
- Kawina prolificus
- Kawina prominulus
- Kawina scrobiculus
- Kawina sinica
- Kawina torulus
- Kawina trentonensis
- Kawina vulcanus
- Kawina webbi
- Kawina wilsoni
