= Emsurina =

Scientific classification
- Kingdom: Animalia
- Phylum: Arthropoda
- Clade: †Artiopoda
- Class: †Trilobita
- Order: †Phacopida
- Family: †Pilekiidae
- Genus: †Emsurina; Sivov in Egorova et al., 1955

Extinct genus of trilobites

Emsurina is a genus of trilobites in the order Phacopida, that existed during the upper Cambrian in what is now Russia. It was described by Sivov in 1955, and the type species is Emsurina sibirica. The type locality was the Tolstochikhin Formation in Salair.
