= Landyia =

Scientific classification
- Kingdom: Animalia
- Phylum: Arthropoda
- Clade: †Artiopoda
- Class: †Trilobita
- Order: †Phacopida
- Family: †Pilekiidae
- Genus: †Landyia; Jell, 1985

Landyia is a trilobite in the order Phacopida, that existed during the lower Ordovician in what is now Australia. It was described by Jell in 1985, and the type species is Landyia elizabethae. The type locality was the Digger Island Formation in Victoria.
