= Heliomera =

Scientific classification
- Domain: Eukaryota
- Kingdom: Animalia
- Phylum: Arthropoda
- Class: †Trilobita
- Order: †Phacopida
- Family: †Cheiruridae
- Genus: †Heliomera; Raymond, 1905

Genus of trilobites

Heliomera is an extinct genus of trilobite in the order Phacopida. It contains two species. H. albata and H. sol.
