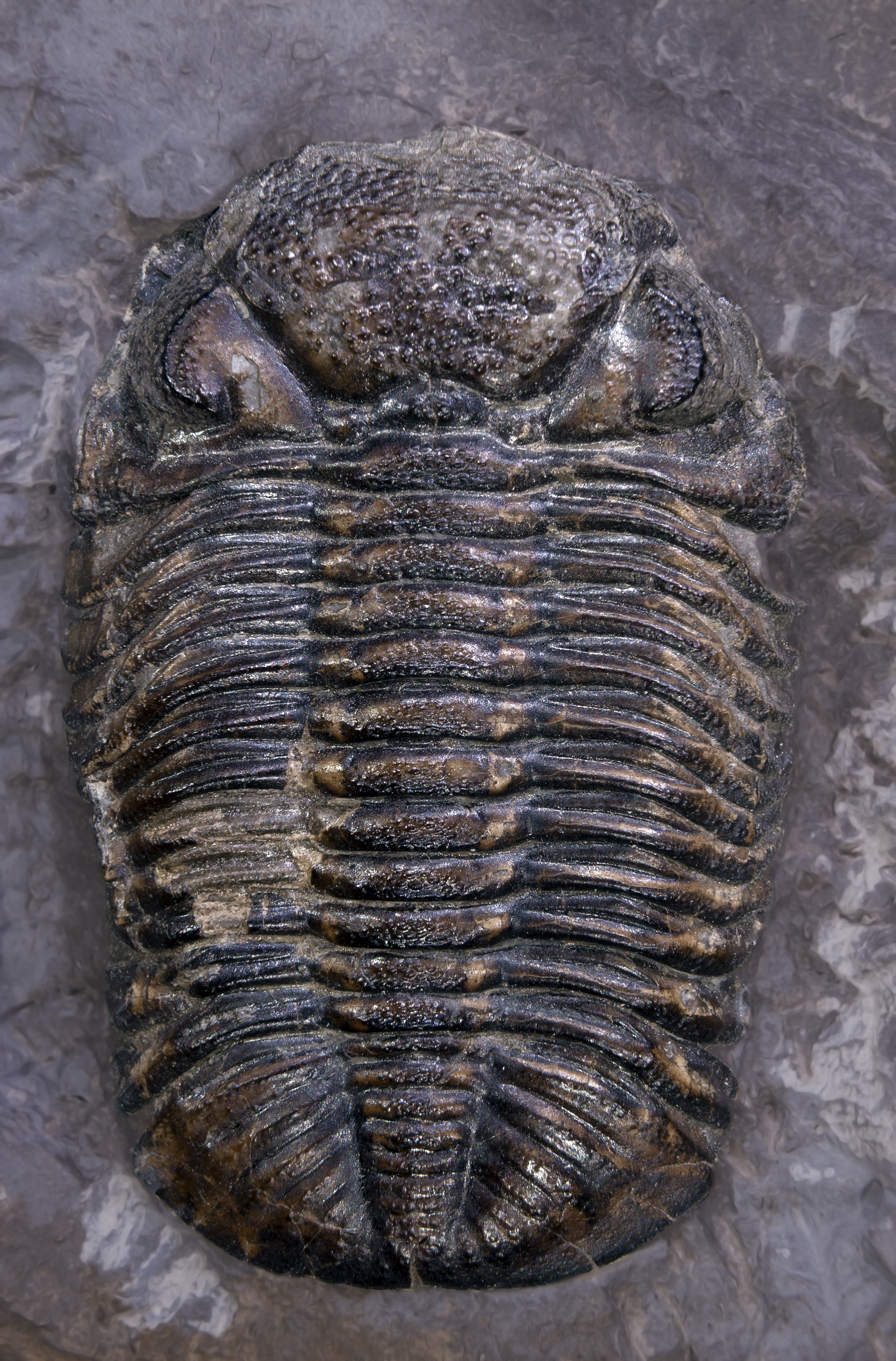
- Phacops rana

Scientific classification
- Domain: Eukaryota
- Kingdom: Animalia
- Phylum: Arthropoda
- Class: †Trilobita
- Order: †Phacopida
- Suborder: †Phacopina
- Superfamily: †Phacopoidea

Families
- Phacopidae; Pterygometopidae

= Phacopoidea =

Phacopoidea Temporal range: Tremadocian–Famennian

Extinct superfamily of trilobites

Phacopoidea is a superfamily of trilobites.
