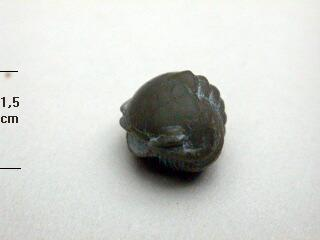
- Gyrometopus lineatus

Scientific classification
- Domain: Eukaryota
- Kingdom: Animalia
- Phylum: Arthropoda
- Class: †Trilobita
- Order: †Phacopida
- Family: †Diaphanometopidae
- Genus: †Gyrometopus; Jaanusson 1975

Species
- G. lineatus (Angelin, 1854) = Nileus lineatus, Diaphanometopus lineatus

= Gyrometopus =

Gyrometopus Temporal range: Floian

Genus of trilobites

Gyrometopus is an extinct genus from a well-known class of fossil marine arthropods, the trilobites. It lived during the Arenig stage of the Ordovician Period, approximately 479 to 472 million years ago.

== Description ==
The central raised area (or glabella) is flattened and its front is slightly expanded. There are 3 pairs of faint and narrow furrows that define lateral lobes. The lip (or rostral plate), the part of the doublure on the midline, is semicircular and the left and right sutures connect before reaching the inner margin of doublure. The articulate midlength part of the exoskeleton (or thorax) has 11 segments, which are divided by narrow pleural furrows. The margin of the tailshield (or pygidium) is entire, and the frontal two segments are well-defined by narrow pleural and interpleural furrows.

== Distribution ==
Gyrometopus lineatus, is found in the Lower Ordovician (Floian) of Sweden (Stora Stola, Timmerdala, Västergötland).

== Relations with other Phacopina ==
Gyrometopus is probably close to the common ancestor of the Phacopina. Gyrometopus is phacopid in appearance, but unlike in other Phacopina, a rostral plate is present, although it does not reach the inside of the cephalic doublure, as is customary in non-Phacopine trilobites.
