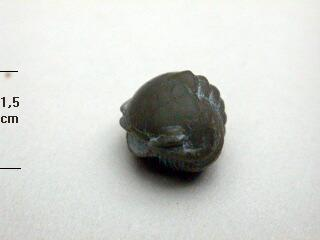
- Gryometopus lineautus

Scientific classification
- Kingdom: Animalia
- Phylum: Arthropoda
- Clade: †Artiopoda
- Class: †Trilobita
- Order: †Phacopida
- Suborder: †Phacopina
- Superfamily: †Dalmanitoidea
- Family: †Diaphanometopidae; Jaanusson in Moore, 1959

Genera
- Diaphanometopus; Gyrometopus; Prodalmanitina

= Diaphanometopidae =

Diaphanometopidae Temporal range: Floian to Dapingian

Extinct family of trilobites

Diaphanometopidae is a family of trilobites. Its representatives lived during the Arenig and Llanvirn stages of the Ordovician Period, approximately 479 to 463 million years ago. The Diaphanometopidae are thought to have been an early transitional group between the Ptychopariida ancestors and all other Phacopina. Diaphanometopidae, are found in the Lower and Middle Ordovician of Sweden and Russia. Three species are assigned to this family: Diaphanometopus volborthi that has been found in the Dapingian of Baltica, Gyrometopus lineatus occurring in the Floian of Baltica and Prodalmanitina nikolaevi that is known from the Floian of Kolyma. These species have many ancestral characters compared to other Phacopina, but they do not seem to be each other's nearest relatives, which makes it unlikely this family will be maintained when the phylogeny has been studied in more detail.
