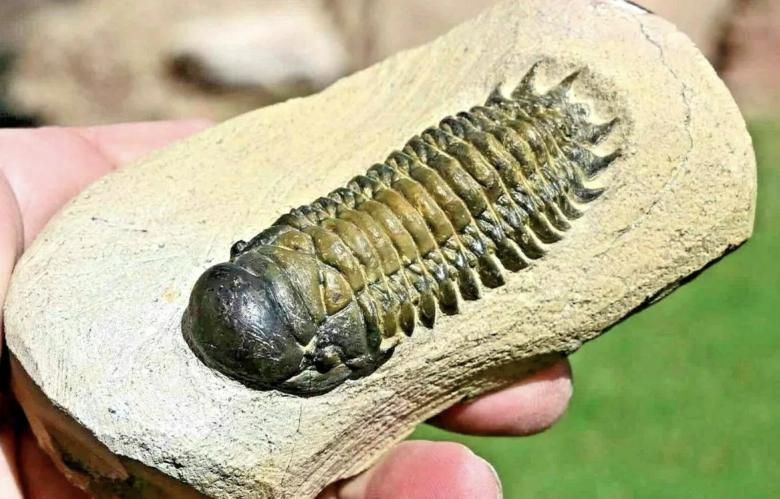

Scientific classification
- Domain: Eukaryota
- Kingdom: Animalia
- Phylum: Arthropoda
- Class: †Trilobita
- Order: †Phacopida
- Family: †Cheiruridae
- Genus: †Crotalocephalus; Salter, 1853

= Crotalocephalus =

Crotalocephalus Temporal range: 425–410 Ma Late Silurian - Early Devonian

Genus of trilobites

Crotalocephalus is a genus of trilobites that lived from the Late Silurian to the Early Devonian. Its remains have been found in Asia, Australia, Africa, and Europe.
