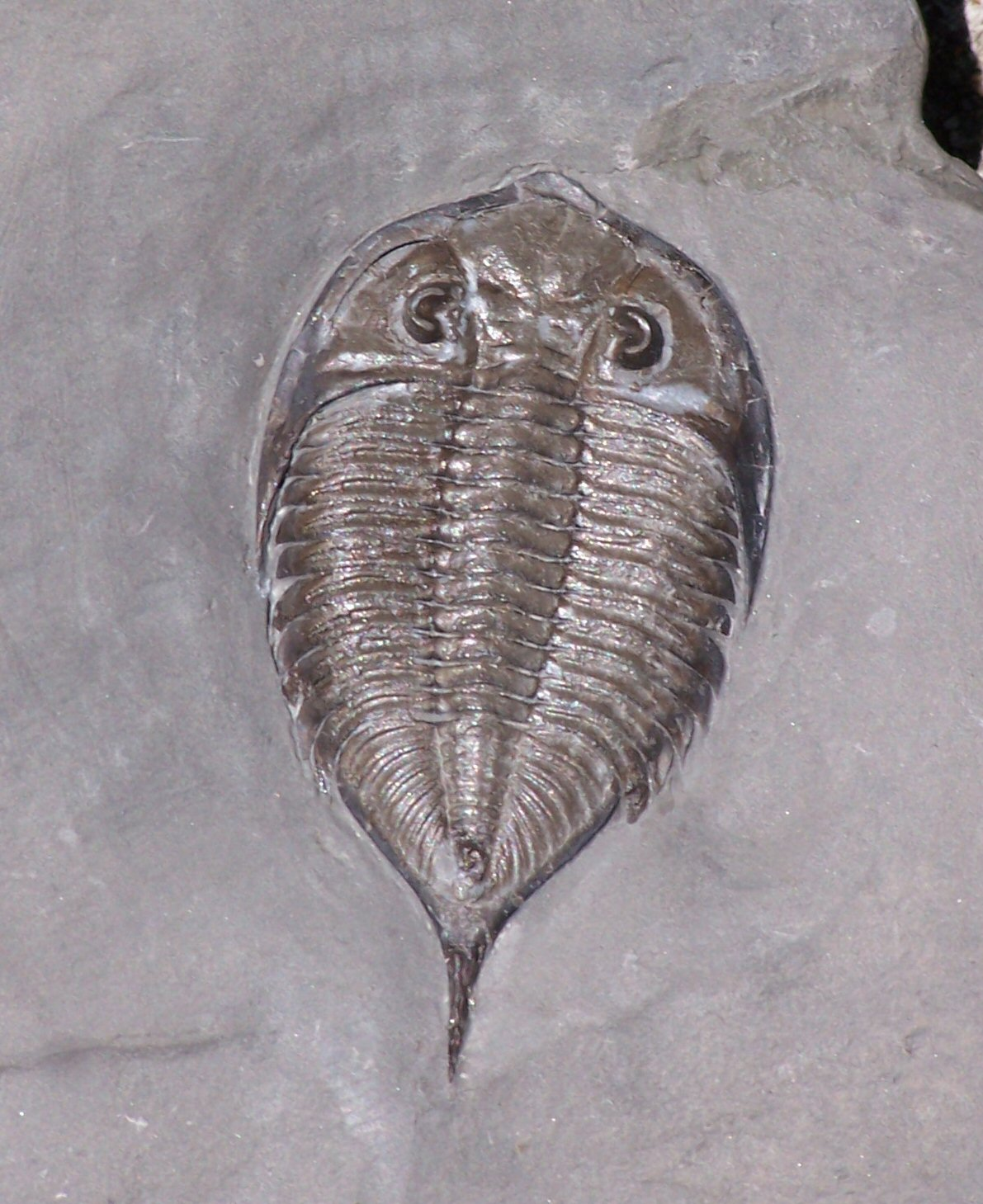
- Dalmanites limulurus

Scientific classification
- Domain: Eukaryota
- Kingdom: Animalia
- Phylum: Arthropoda
- Class: †Trilobita
- Order: †Phacopida
- Suborder: †Phacopina
- Superfamily: †Dalmanitoidea; Vogdes, 1890

Families
- Dalmanitidae; Diaphanometopidae; Prosopiscidae

= Dalmanitoidea =

Extinct superfamily of trilobites

Dalmanitoidea is a superfamily of trilobites in the order Phacopida, containing the three families Dalmanitidae, Diaphanometopidae and Prosopiscidae.
