= Macrogrammus =

Macrogrammus Temporal range: Early Arenig

Scientific classification
- Kingdom: Animalia
- Phylum: Arthropoda
- Clade: †Artiopoda
- Class: †Trilobita
- Order: †Phacopida
- Family: †Pilekiidae
- Genus: †Macrogrammus; Whittard, 1966

Macrogrammus is an extinct genus from a well-known class of fossil marine arthropods, the trilobites. It lived during the early part of the Arenig stage of the Ordovician Period, a faunal stage which lasted from approximately 478 to 471 million years ago. Its fossil name is Macrogrammus scylfense Whittard named after its British Collector WF Whittard in 1966.
