= Actinopeltis (fungus) =

Scientific classification
- Kingdom: Fungi
- Division: Ascomycota
- Class: Dothideomycetes
- Order: Microthyriales
- Family: Trichothyriaceae
- Genus: Actinopeltis; Höhn.

Type species
- Actinopeltis peristomalis Höhn.

Genus of fungi

Actinopeltis is a genus of fungi in the family Trichothyriaceae.

== Species ==
As accepted by Species Fungorum;

- Actinopeltis acicola S.K. Bose & E. Müll. (1967)
- Actinopeltis ciliaris S.K. Bose & E. Müll. (1964)
- Actinopeltis echinata (G. Arnaud) Arx (1962)
- Actinopeltis englerulae (Hansf.) Arx (1962)
- Actinopeltis hysterostomellae (Hansf.) Arx (1962)
- Actinopeltis nitida (Doidge) Arx (1962)
- Actinopeltis philodendri Bat. (1953)
- Actinopeltis scitula Syd. (1935)
- Actinopeltis sordidula (Arx) P.M. Kirk & Spooner (1990)

Former species;

- A. adianti (Syd.) Arx (1962) = Chaetothyriopsis adianti, Trichothyriaceae
- A. funtumiae Hansf. (1941) = Treubiomyces funtumiae, Chaetothyriaceae
- A. palustris J.P. Ellis (1977) = Lichenopeltella palustris Microthyriaceae
- A. peltigericola D. Hawksw. (1982) = Lichenopeltella peltigericola, Microthyriaceae
- A. peristomalis Höhn. (1907) = Trichothyrium peristomale, Trichothyriaceae
