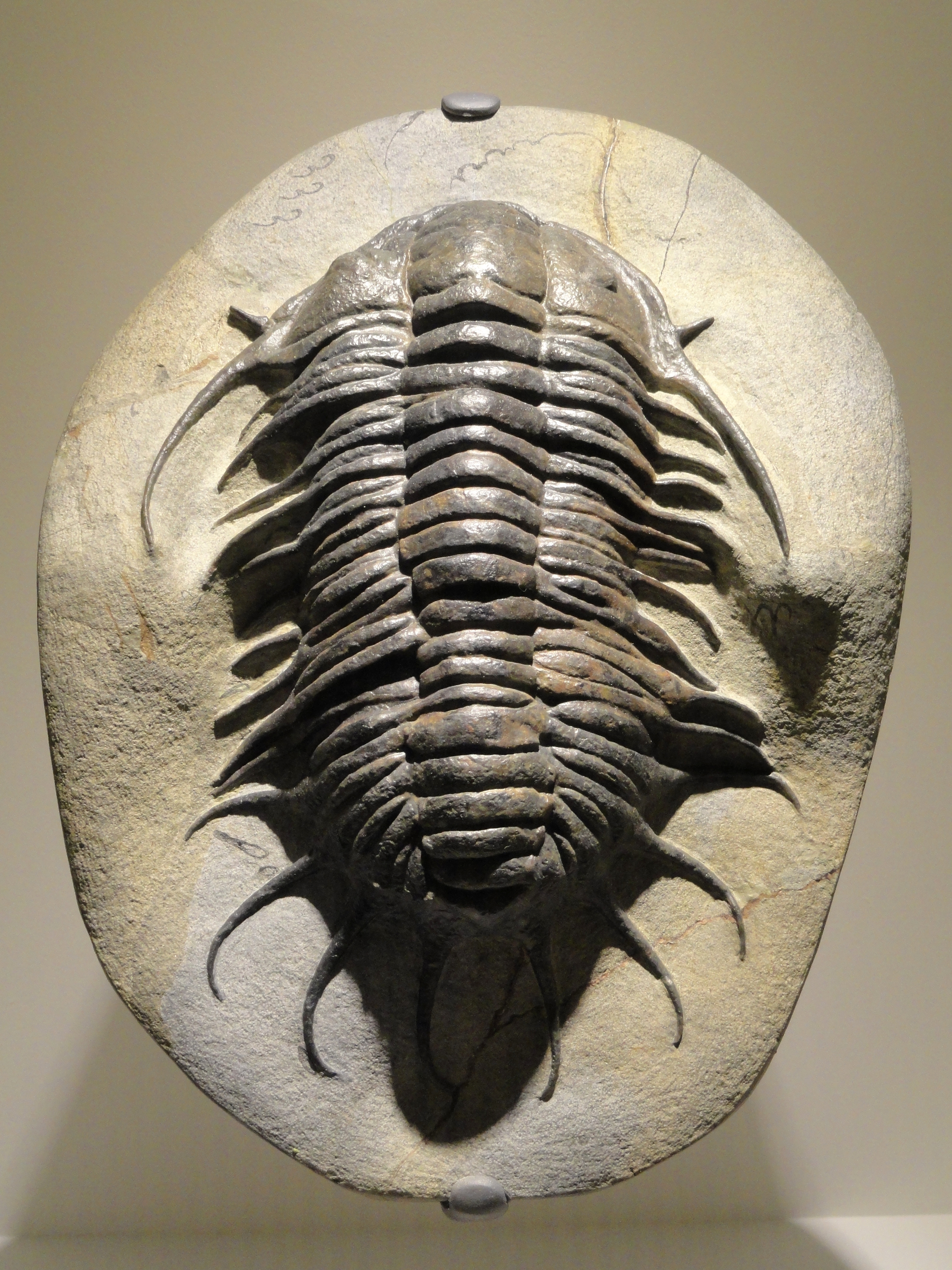
- Parapilekia cf. olesnaensis

Scientific classification
- Kingdom: Animalia
- Phylum: Arthropoda
- Clade: †Artiopoda
- Class: †Trilobita
- Order: †Phacopida
- Suborder: †Cheirurina
- Family: †Pilekiidae; Sdzuy, 1955

= Pilekiidae =

Pilekiidae is a family of trilobites in the order Phacopida, specifically within suborder Cheirurina. It includes the following genera:

- Anacheiruraspis
- Anacheirurus
- Chashania
- Demeterops
- Emsurina
- Koraipsis
- Landyia
- Macrogrammus
- Metapilekia
- Metapliomerops
- Parapilekia
- Pilekia
- Pliomeroides
- Pseudopliomera
- Seisonia
- Sinoparapilekia
- Victorispina
