= Ceraurinella =

Scientific classification
- Domain: Eukaryota
- Kingdom: Animalia
- Phylum: Arthropoda
- Class: †Trilobita
- Order: †Phacopida
- Family: †Cheiruridae
- Genus: †Ceraurinella; Cooper, 1953

Extinct genus of trilobites

Ceraurinella is an extinct genus of trilobite in the family Cheiruridae. There are about 19 described species in Ceraurinella.

== Species ==
These 19 species belong to the genus Ceraurinella:

- † Ceraurinella arctica Ludvigsen, 1979
- † Ceraurinella brevispina Ludvigsen, 1979
- † Ceraurinella buttsi Cooper
- † Ceraurinella chondra Whittington & Evitt, 1953
- † Ceraurinella kingstoni Chatterton & Ludvigsen, 1976
- † Ceraurinella latipyga Shaw, 1968
- † Ceraurinella longispina Ludvigsen, 1979
- † Ceraurinella media Ludvigsen, 1979
- † Ceraurinella nahanniensis Chatterton & Ludvigsen, 1976
- † Ceraurinella necra Ludvigsen, 1979
- † Ceraurinella oepiki Edgecombe et al., 1999
- † Ceraurinella polydorus (Billings, 1865)
- † Ceraurinella pompilia (Billings, 1865)
- † Ceraurinella seriata Ludvigsen, 1979
- † Ceraurinella templetoni
- † Ceraurinella tenuisculptus (Bradley, 1930)
- † Ceraurinella typa Cooper, 1953
- † Ceraurinella zhoui Edgecombe et al., 1999
