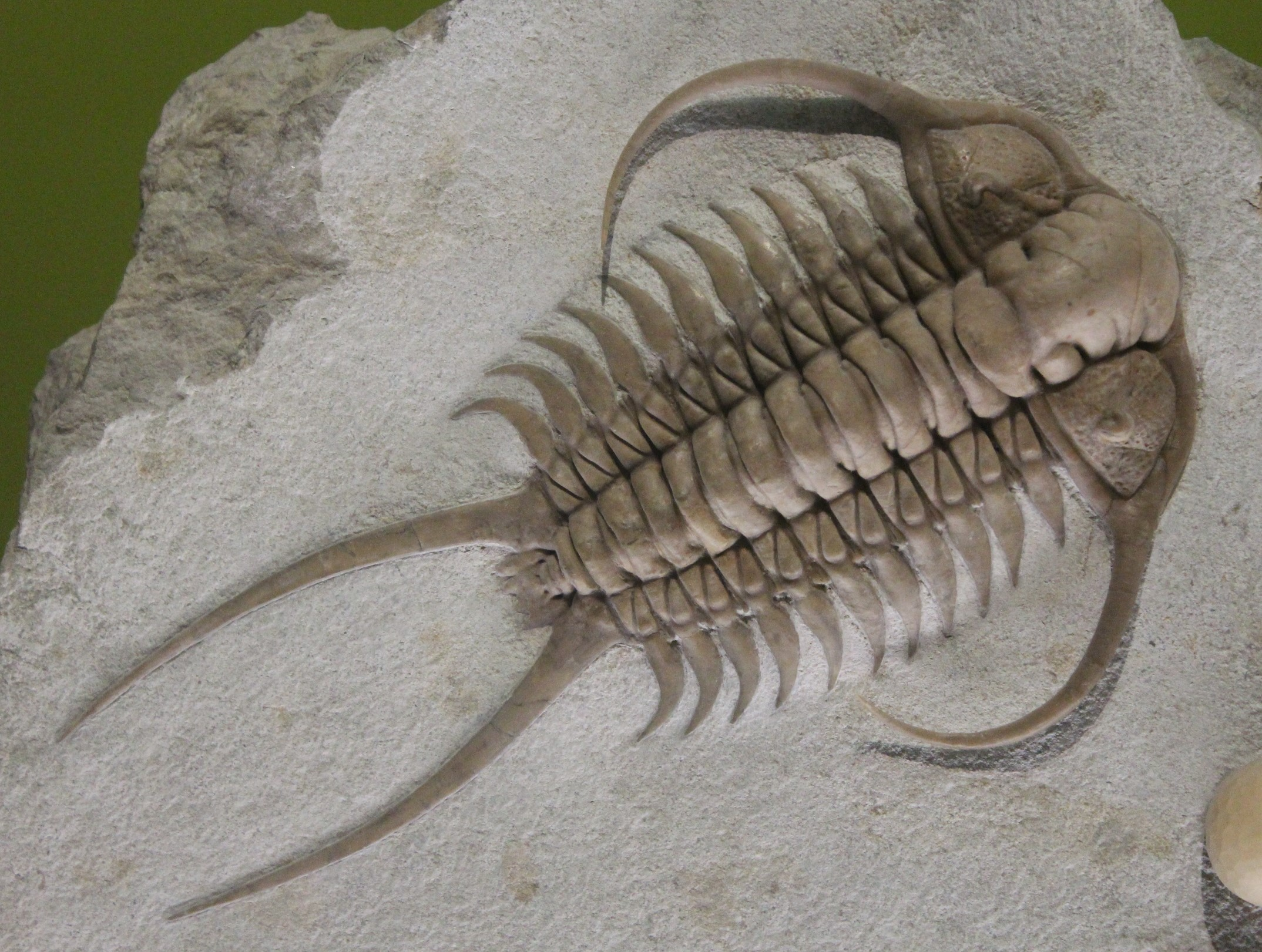
- C. ingricus, National Museum of Natural History

Scientific classification
- Domain: Eukaryota
- Kingdom: Animalia
- Phylum: Arthropoda
- Class: †Trilobita
- Order: †Phacopida
- Family: †Cheiruridae
- Genus: †Cheirurus; Beyrich, 1845

Species
- Cheirurus dilatatus Raymond, 1916; Cheirurus glaber Angelin, 1854; Cheirurus niagarensis Hall, 1868; Cheirurus patens Raymond, 1916

= Cheirurus =

Cheirurus Temporal range: Ordovician–Middle Devonian

Genus of trilobites

Cheirurus (from Greek χείρ, cheir meaning "hand" and ουρά, oura meaning "tail") is a genus of phacopid trilobites that lived from the Ordovician to the Devonian. Its remains have been found in Africa, Asia, Australia, Europe, and North America. Cheirurus is the type genus of Cheiruridae.
