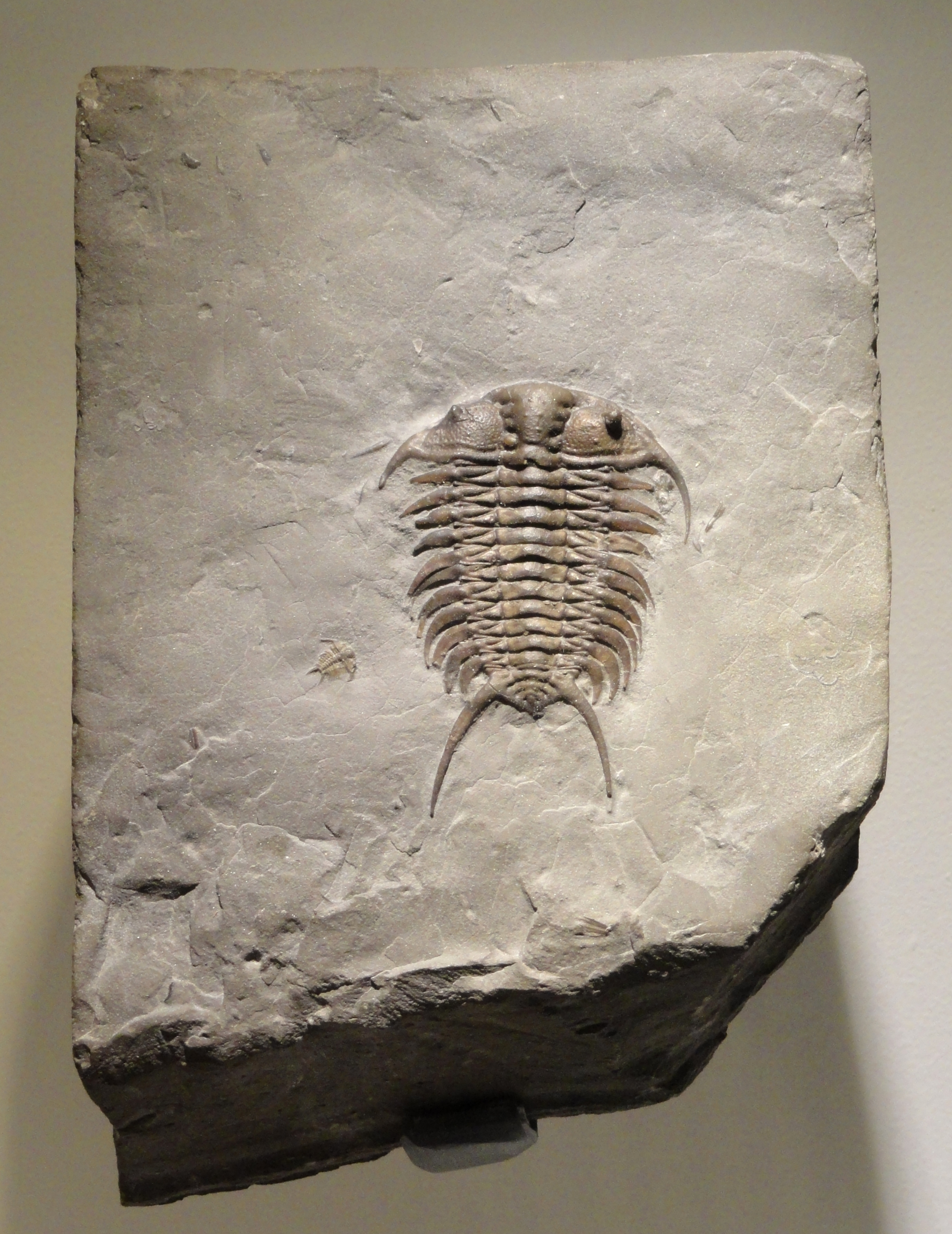
- Fossil Ceraurus with baby.

Scientific classification
- Domain: Eukaryota
- Kingdom: Animalia
- Phylum: Arthropoda
- Class: †Trilobita
- Order: †Phacopida
- Family: †Cheiruridae
- Genus: †Ceraurus; Green, 1832

= Ceraurus =

Ceraurus Temporal range: Middle Ordovician–Late Ordovician

Genus of trilobites

Ceraurus is a genus of cheirurid trilobite of the middle and, much more rarely, the upper Ordovician. They are commonly found in strata of the lower Great Lakes region. These trilobites have eleven thoracic segments, a very small pygidium and long genal and pygidial spines.

Ceraurus is quite common in the Ordovician of upstate New York, south-central and south-eastern Ontario, and the St. Lawrence Valley in Quebec, as well as in the Canadian Arctic. It and similar genera range in size from less than quarter an inch to well over five inches. Similar genera of trilobites occur in the Ordovician outcrops of the Volkhov River, near St. Petersburg, Russia.

The taxonomy of the genus is problematic, as the many variations of eye placement, decoration patterns of pustules, and spine length call the genus' defining characteristics into question. Ceraurus may, in fact, be at least four genera: Ceraurus sensu stricto, and the genera, Gabriceraurus, Bufoceraurus and Leviceraurus.
