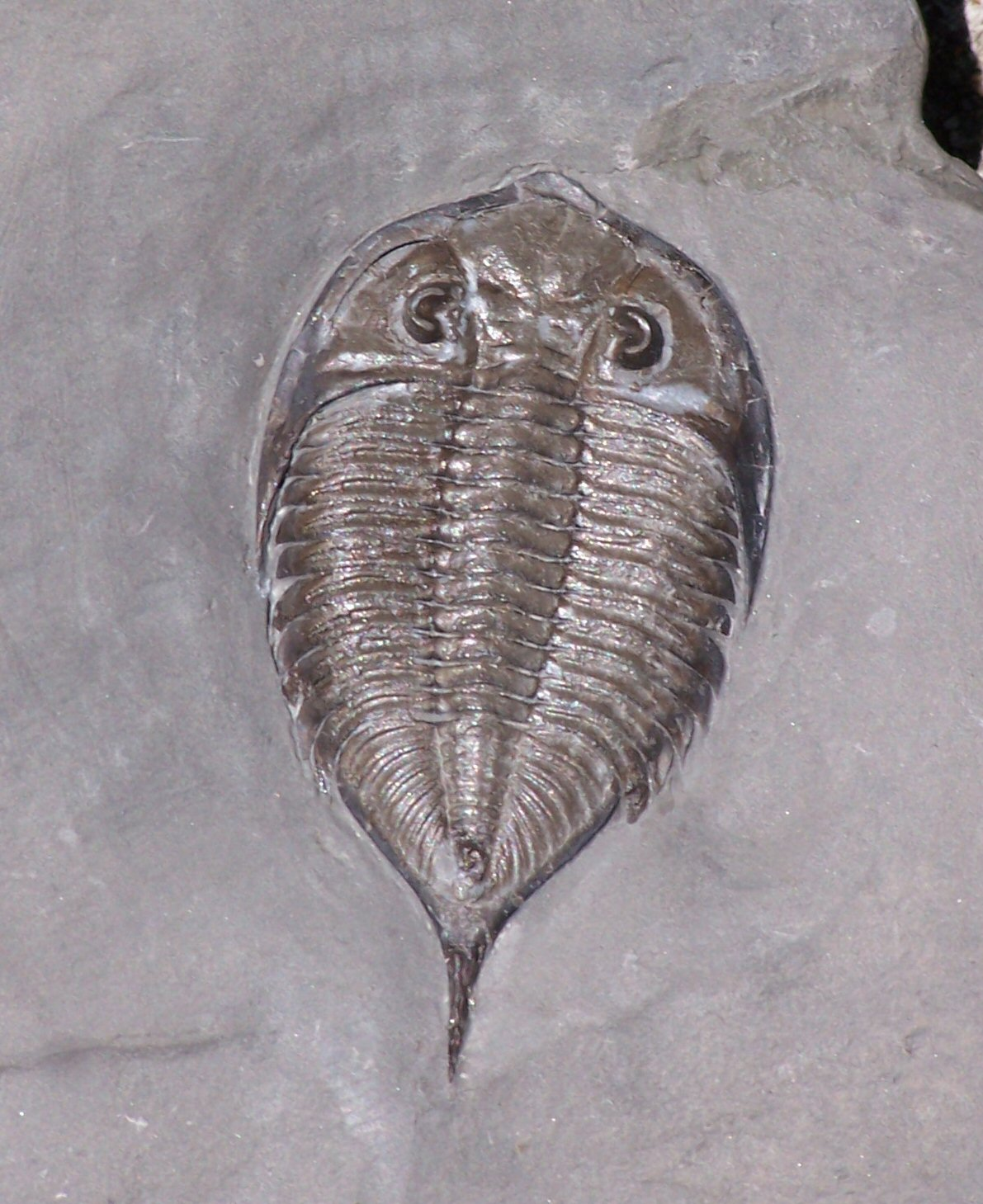
- Dalmanites limulurus, a trilobite of the suborder Phacopina

Scientific classification
- Kingdom: Animalia
- Phylum: Arthropoda
- Clade: †Artiopoda
- Class: †Trilobita
- Order: †Phacopida; Salter, 1864

Suborders
- Calymenina; Cheirurina; Phacopina

= Phacopida =

Phacopida Temporal range: Furongian – End Famennian, 497–359 Ma

Extinct order of trilobites

Phacopida ("lens-face") is an order of trilobites that lived from the Late Cambrian to the Late Devonian. It is made up of a morphologically diverse assemblage of taxa in three related suborders.

== Characteristics ==
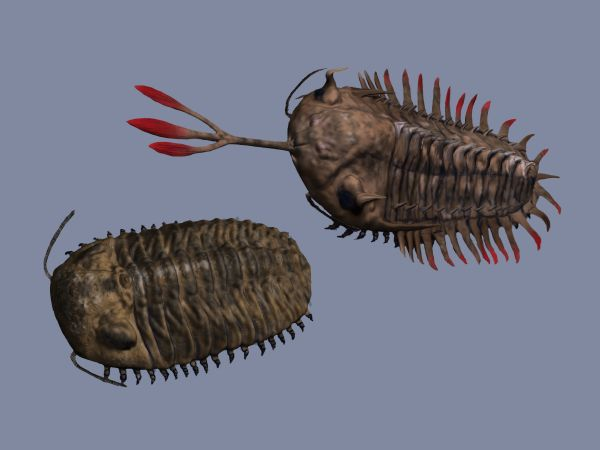
Reconstruction of Phacops (Phacopidae, left) and Walliserops (Acastidae, right)

Phacopida had 8 to 19 thoracic segments and are distinguishable by the expanded glabella, short or absent preglabellar area, and schizochroal (Phacopina) or holochroal (Cheirurina and Calymenina) eyes. Schizochroal eyes are compound eyes with up to around 700 separate lenses. Each lens has an individual cornea which extended into a rather large sclera.

The development of schizochroal eyes in phacopid trilobites is an example of post-displacement paedomorphosis. The eyes of immature holochroal Cambrian trilobites were basically miniature schizochroal eyes. In Phacopida, these were retained, via delayed growth of these immature structures (post-displacement), into the adult form.

Eldredgeops rana (Phacopidae) and Dalmanites limulurus (Dalmanitidae) are two of the best-known members of this order. Other known phacopids include Cheirurus (Cheiruridae), Deiphon (Cheiruridae), Calymene (Calymenidae), Flexicalymene (Calymenidae) and Ceraurinella (Cheiruridae).

== Evolution ==
The origin of the order Phacopida is uncertain. It comprises three suborders (Phacopina, Calymenina, and Cheirurina) which share a distinctive protaspis (unsegmented larva ) with three pairs of spines on its body. The Cheirurina and Calymenina retain a rostral plate (an apomorphy) but in virtually all Phacopina the free cheeks are yoked as a single piece. This sort of similarity in development suggests phylogenetic unity. The suborder Calymenina is the most primitive of the Phacopida order and shares some characteristics with the order Ptychopariida, though it is not included in the subclass Librostoma.

Phacopida was one of only two trilobite orders (along with the Proetida) to survive the Kellwasser event (Late Devonian extinction) at the Frasnian-Famennian boundary. However, they would die out soon afterwards at the Hangenberg event (end-Devonian extinction) at the end of the Famennian.

== Classification ==
- Suborder Calymenina
  - Family Bathycheilidae
  - Family Bavarillidae
  - Family Calymenidae
  - Family Homalonotidae
  - Family Pharostomatidae
- Suborder Cheirurina
  - Family Cheiruridae
  - Family Encrinuridae
  - Family Pilekiidae
  - Family Pliomeridae
- Suborder Phacopina
  - Superfamily Acastoidea
    - Family Acastidae
    - Family Calmoniidae
  - Superfamily Dalmanitoidea
    - Family Dalmanitidae
    - Family Diaphanometopidae
    - Family Prosopiscidae
  - Superfamily Phacopoidea
    - Family Phacopidae
    - Family Pterygometopidae

Stereo image
Left frame
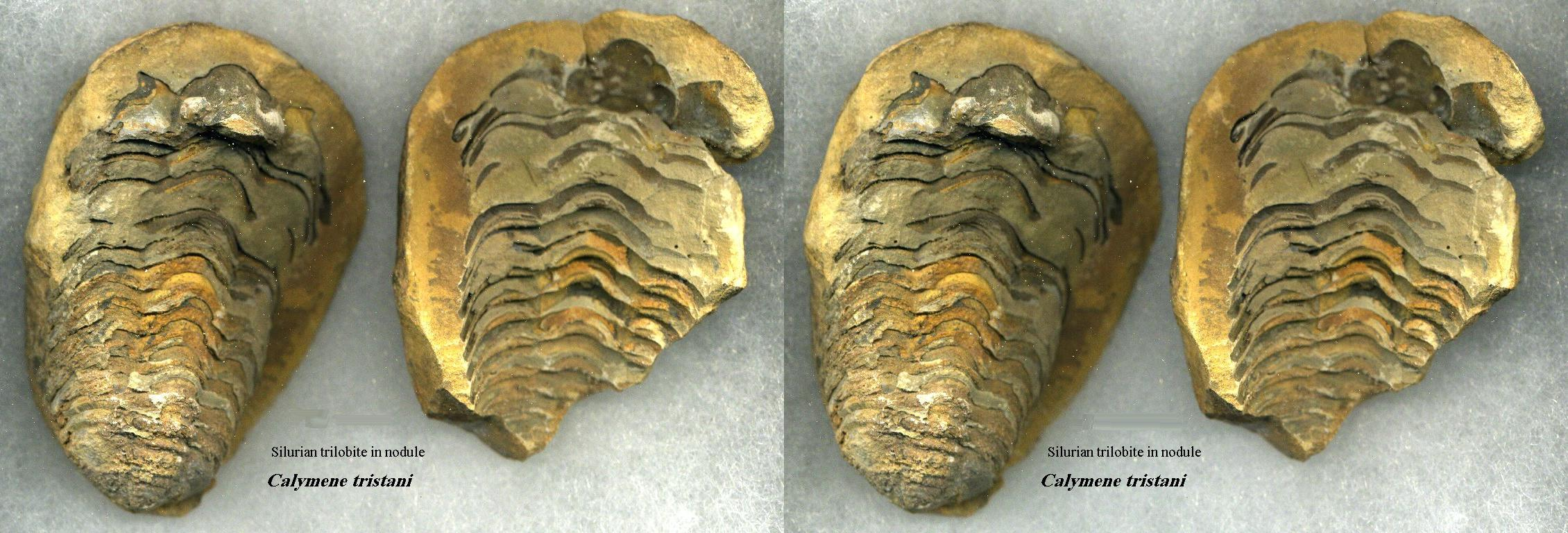
Right frame
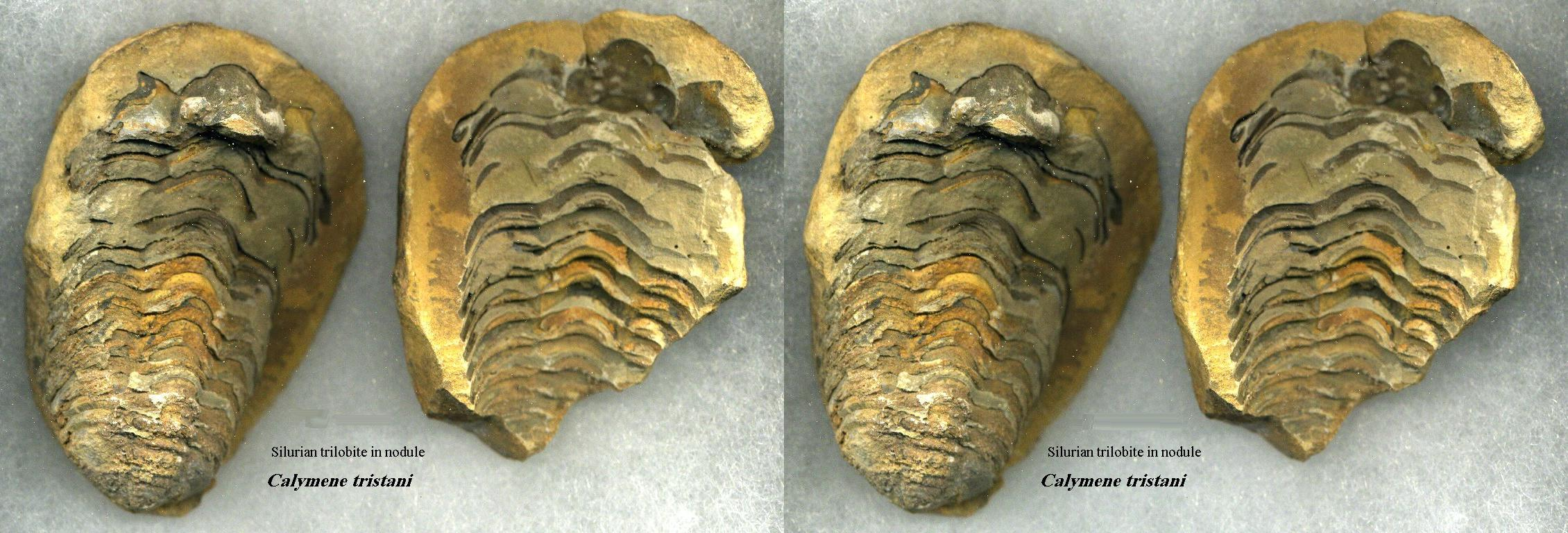
Parallel view
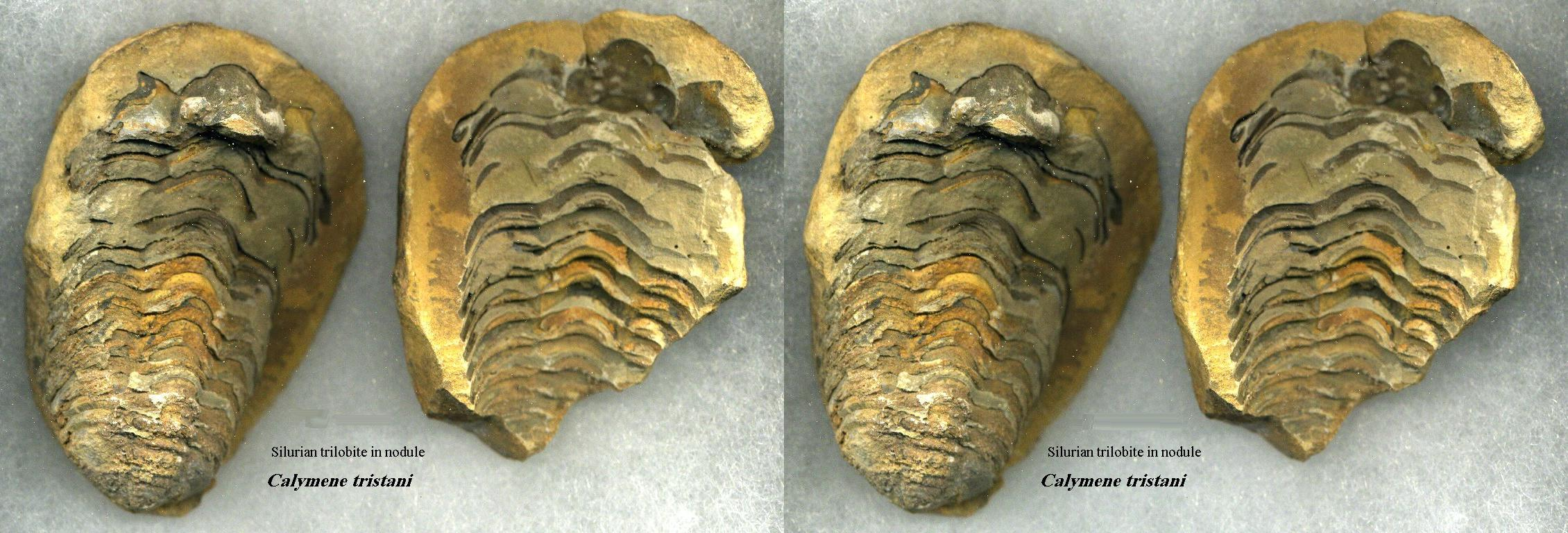
Cross-eye view
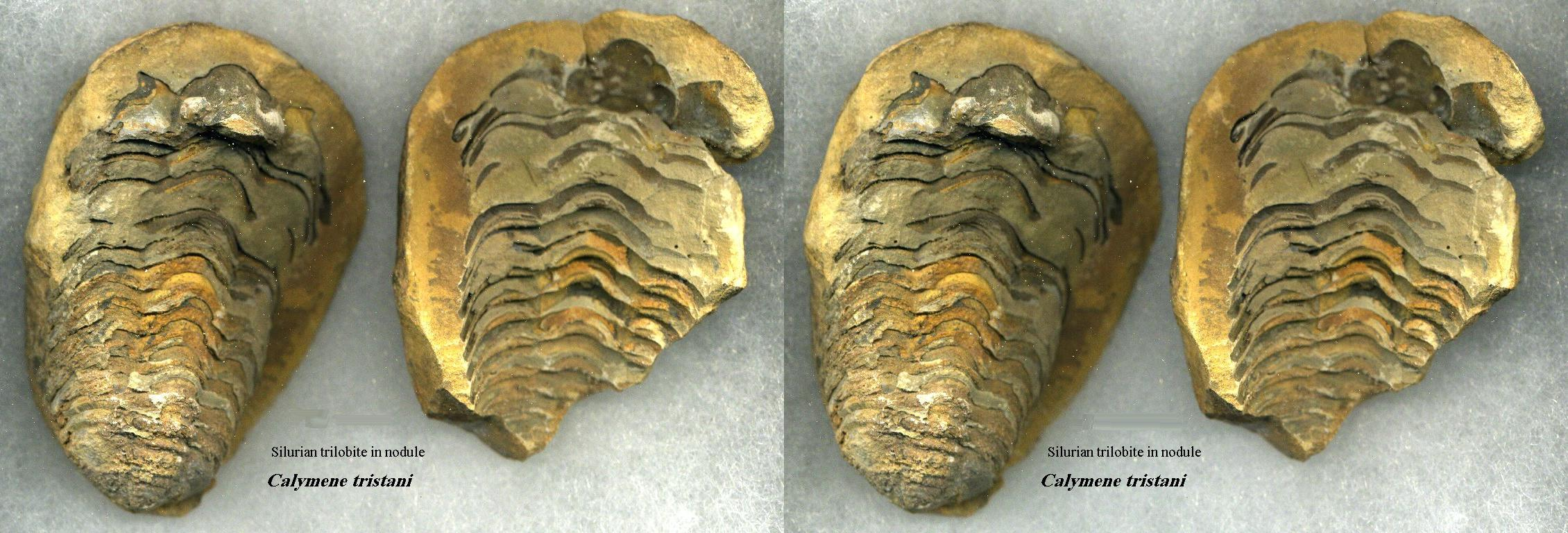

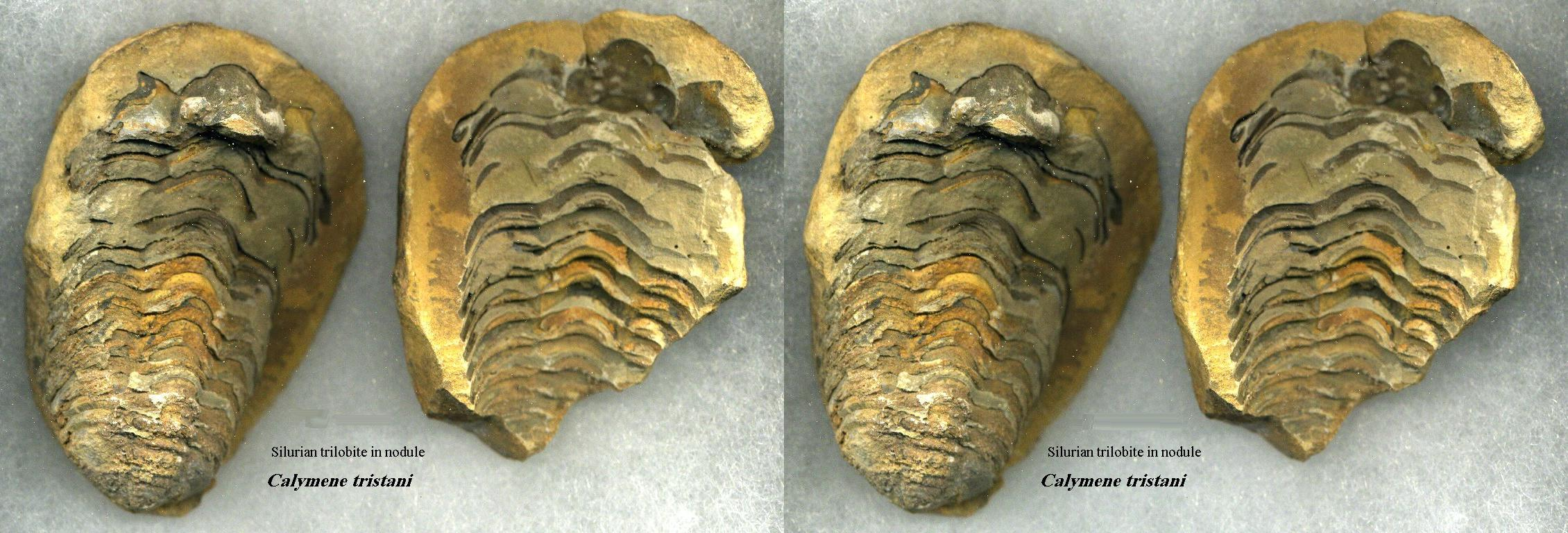
- Image of phacopidan trilobite Calymene tristani in anodule.
