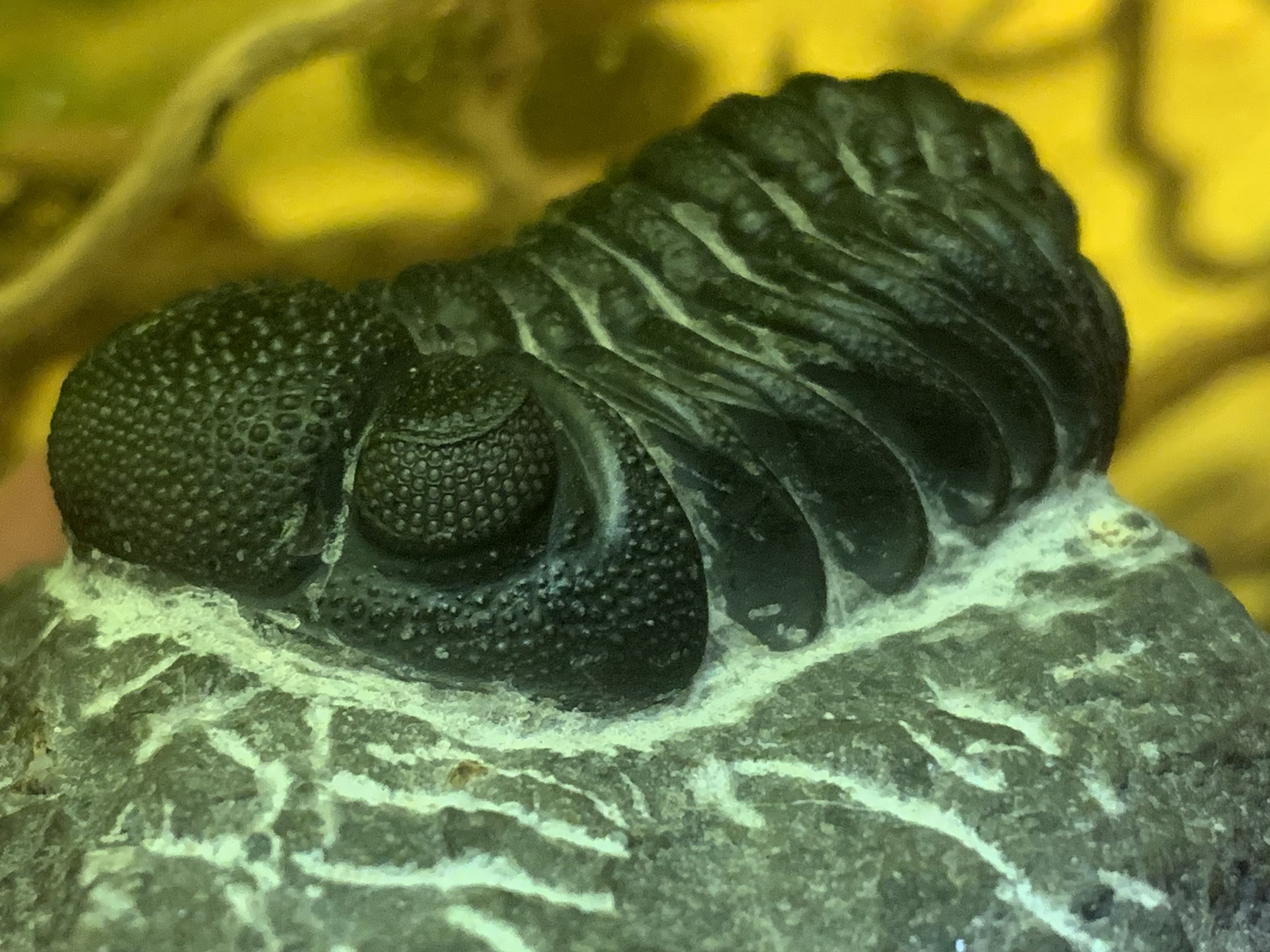
- Phacops sp. from the Eifelian of Morocco
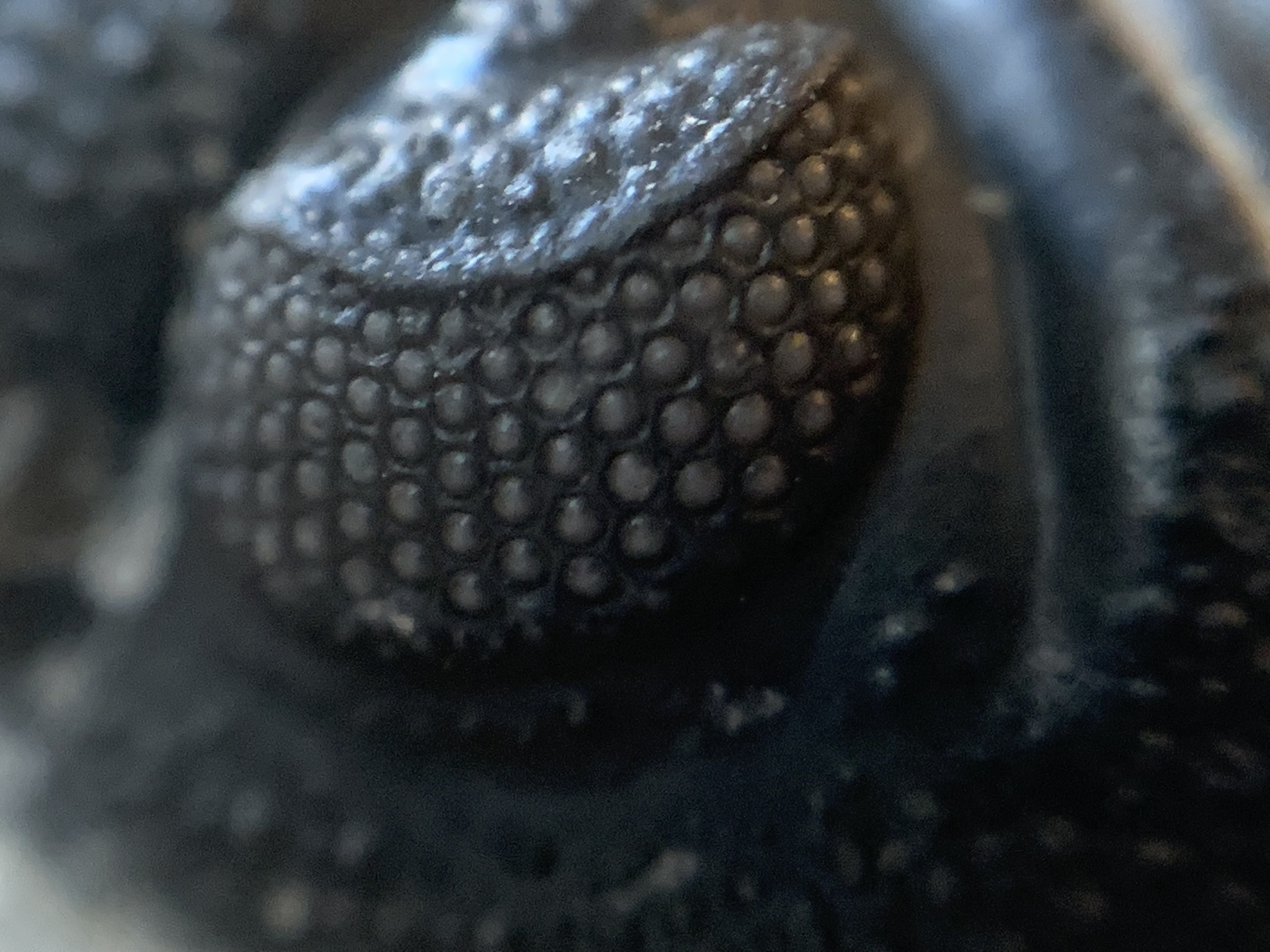
- Phacops sp. eye

Scientific classification
- Kingdom: Animalia
- Phylum: Arthropoda
- Clade: †Artiopoda
- Class: †Trilobita
- Order: †Phacopida
- Family: †Phacopidae
- Genus: †Phacops; Emmrich, 1839

Type species
- Calymene latifrons Bronn, 1825

Species
- P. latifrons (Bronn, 1825) (type) synonym Calymene latifrons; and see text

Synonyms
- Portlockia; Somatrikelon; Somatrikopon

= Phacops =

Phacops Temporal range: Late Ordovician-Late Devonian ~457–360 Ma

Genus of trilobites

Phacops is a genus of trilobites in the order Phacopida, family Phacopidae, that lived in Europe, northwestern Africa, North and South America and China from the Late Ordovician until the very end of the Devonian, with a broader time range described from the Late Ordovician. It was a rounded animal, with a globose head and large eyes, and probably fed on detritus. Phacops is often found rolled up ("volvation"), a biological defense mechanism that is widespread among smaller trilobites but further perfected in this genus.

== Description ==
Like in all sighted Phacopina, the eyes of Phacops are compounded of very large, separately set lenses without a common cornea (so called schizochroal eyes), and like almost all other Phacopina, the articulate mid-length part of the body (or thorax) in Phacops has 11 segments.

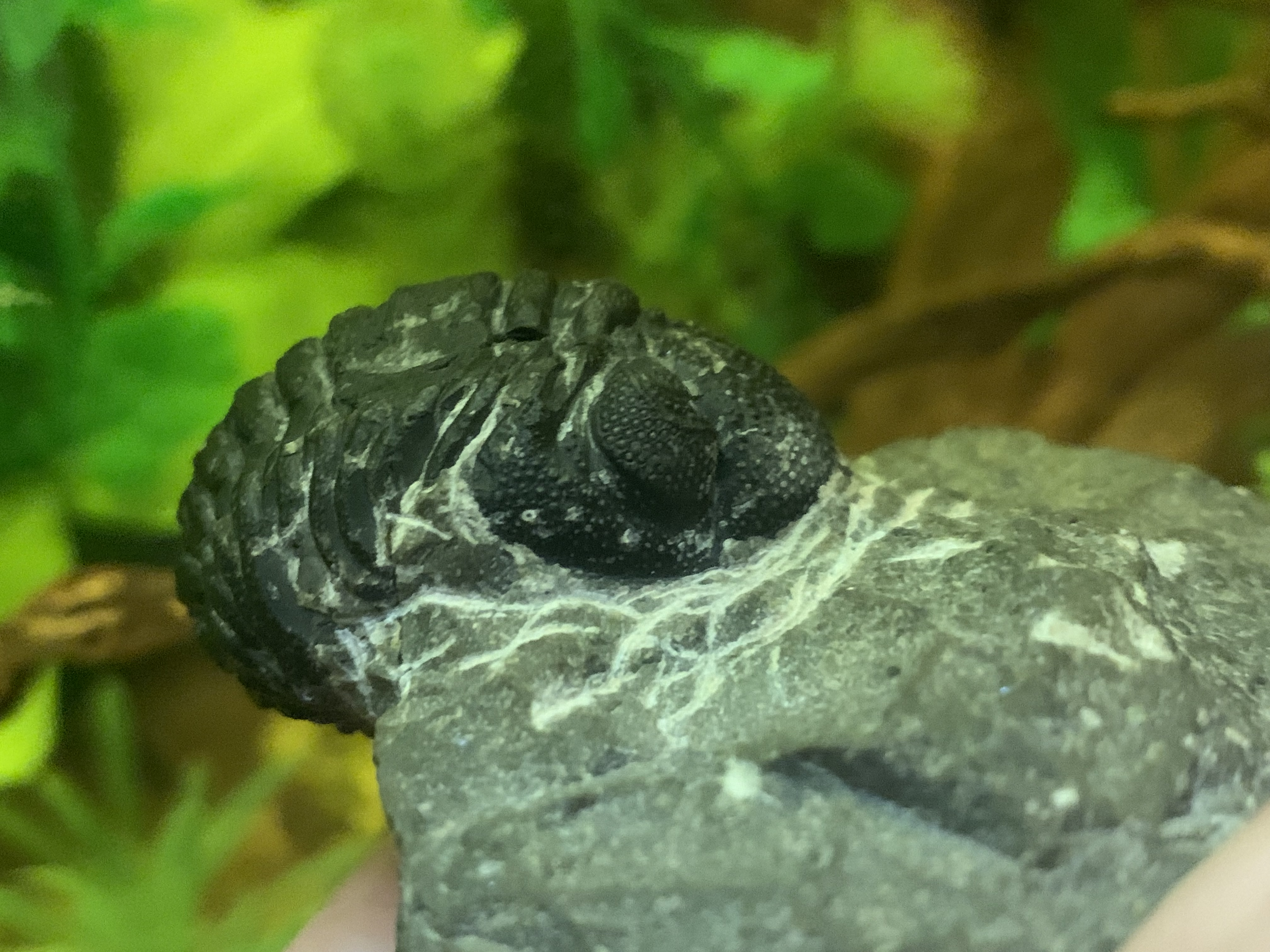
Unknown enrolled Phacops sp. from the Eifelian of Morocco.

The central raised area (or glabella) of the headshield (or cephalon) is moderately to strongly inflated near to its front, more or less flattened on the top, falling vertically to or slightly overhanging the border furrow. Up to three lateral furrows may be discernable on the glabella behind the utterly dominating frontal lobe. From the back there is a very distinct occipital ring, and in front of that a distinct preoccipital ring which is weakly divided into a strongly convex central lobe and weakly convex lateral lobes. The large to medium size eyes have a crescent shaped outline, and are elevated high above the cheeks. The steep visual surface is kidney shaped. The back corners of the cephalon (or genal angles) are acutely to bluntly rounded, but a genal spine is lacking in adults. In the ventral surface of the seam (or doublure) is in the frontal half of the cephalon a continuous furrow, delineated by ridges, and with notches laterally. This so-called vindicular furrow serves to lock the rim of the tailshield to the headshield when the trilobite is enrolled.

The axial rings of the thorax do not have convex lateral axial nodes on its outer surface. The tailshield (or pygidium) is well segmented. The pygidial axis has 9 to 11 rings, and the pleural areas to the sides have 5 to 8 pairs of recognizable ribs. Furrows between the ribs are deep, those that divide each rib in frontal and rear bands are very shallow, and the frontal bands are widest. The surface of the exoskeleton is covered in tubercles.

=== Camouflage ===
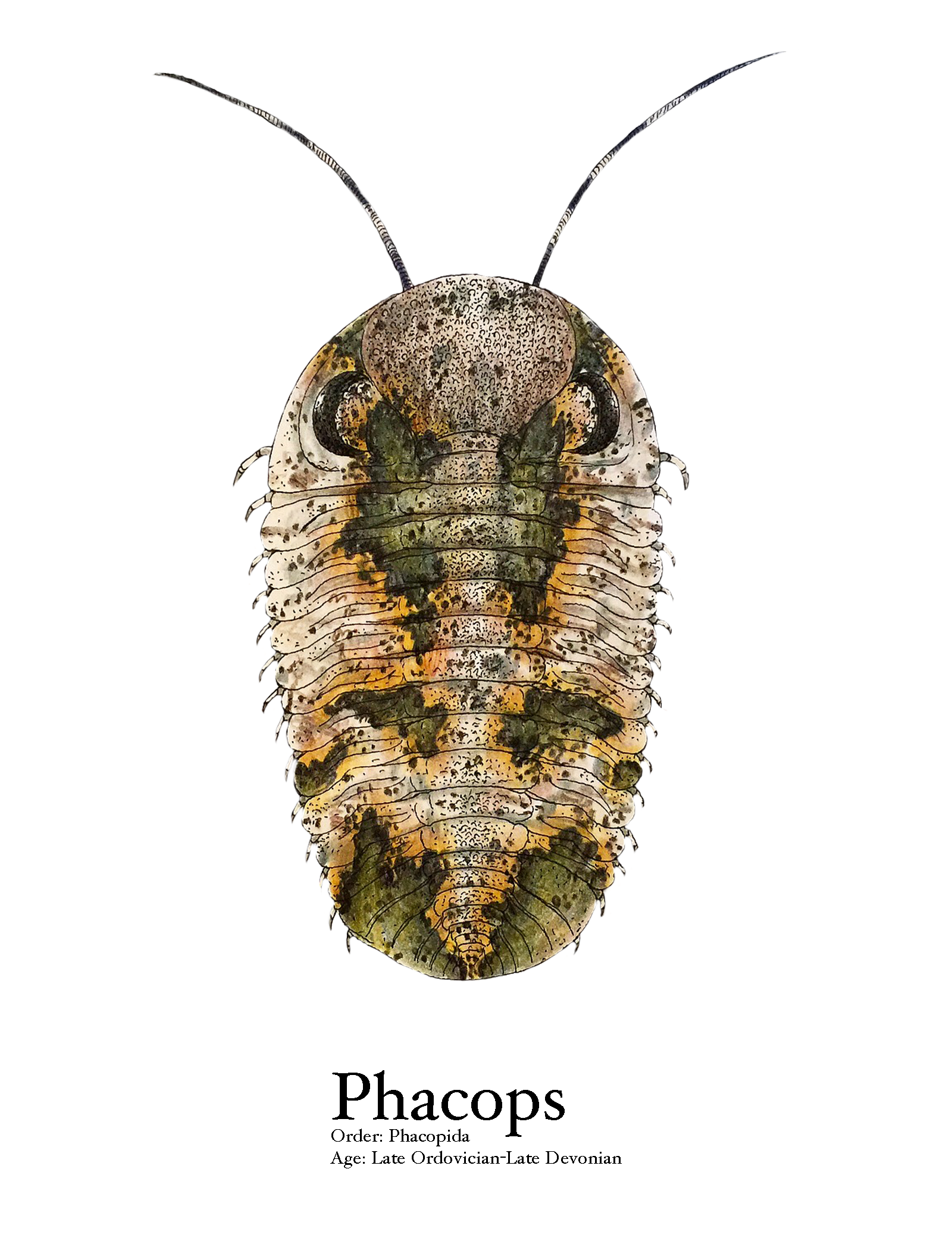
Reconstruction of Phacops with a speculative, cryptic "Rorschach" pattern based on the proposed ability to camouflage.

There are specimens known of Phacops rana with many irregular black spots. Because similar spots in a specimen of Greenops boothi from the same site are arranged in rows, it may be assumed that they are original and not caused by the fossilisation process. The spots are irregular and have spurs branching outwardly, similar to the melanophores in many extant animals. In one specimen, the black spots are much larger than in another one. It is quite conceivable that changing the size of the melanophores enabled Phacops rana to camouflage itself in different environments.

== Taxonomy ==
The concept of many fossil taxa has been tightened over time, including Phacops. As a result, Boeckops, Chotecops, Paciphacops, Prokops and Viaphacops have been erected as subgenera of Phacops, and are now widely regarded as genera in their own right. Most recent, it was considered that some North-American and North-African species on the one hand and European species on the other hand differ sufficiently from each other to be assigned to separate genera. As the type species is the European P. latifrons, the North-American species are now called Eldredgeops. However, the previous assigned species, like Phacops rana, are still widely used among fossil collectors. Eldredgeops has a raised ridge along the ventral margin of the cephalon, the glabella is more inflated, the lateral parts of the preoccipital ring are not round but rectangular, the palpebral area and palpebral lobe are larger than in P. latifrons, and there is no fold right behind the posterior vertical row of lenses, nor an isolated raised area just below the lenses. Not all of these characters may differentiate between Eldredgeops and other Phacops species however.

During the Eifelian in the present-day Belgian Ardennes, several Phacops species developed from each other, the oldest being P. imitator, followed by P. fragosus, then P. latifrons and finally P. sartenaeri. These species show a decrease in the number of lenses, which is a more widespread and recurring trend in many Phacopinae.

Fossils of Phacops salteri have been found in the trilobite-rich Late Emsian to Early Givetian Floresta Formation of the Altiplano Cundiboyacense, Colombia.

=== Species ===
Phacops currently contains the following species:

- P. accipitrinus (Phillips, 1841)
- P. algericus Alberti, 1983
- P. breviceps Barrande, 1846
- P. chlupaci Alberti, 1983
- P. circumspectans Paeckelmann, 1913
- P. degener Barrande, 1852
- P. fecundus
- P. fragosus Struve, 1970
- P. granulatus (Munster, 1840) synonyms Calymene granulata, P. posidoniae
- P. hoseri Hawle & Corda, 1847
- P. iowensis Delo, 1935
- P. imitator Struve, 1970
- P. kockeli Alberti, 1968
- P. latifrons (Bronn, 1825)
- P. maurulus
- P. modestus Barrande
- P. ouarouroutensis Crônier, 2018
- P. platilegnotor
- P. salteri Kozlowski, 1923
- P. sartenaeri Struve, 1985
- P. sobolevi Kielan, 1954
- P. sternbergi
- P. turco Richter & Richter
- P. wedekindi Richter & Richter, 1926
- P. zinkeni F.A. Roemer, 1843

=== Species previously assigned to Phacops ===
A number of species previously assigned to the genus Phacops have since been transferred to other genera:

- P. acuticeps = Acuticryphops acuticeps
- P. arcticus = Acernaspis arctica
- P. asper = Ananaspis aspera
- P. birdsongensis = Paciphacops birdsongensis
- P. boecki = Boeckops boecki
- P. braziliensis = Phacopidina braziliensis
- P. bronni = Reedops bronni
- P. bulliceps = Eophacops bulliceps
- P. caecus = Trimerocephalus caecus
- P. caffer = Metacryphaeus caffer
- P. cambelli = Paciphacops cambelli
- P. claviger = Paciphacops claviger
- P. caudatus = Dalmanites caudatus
- P. constrictus = Acastoides constrictus
- P. coronatus = Heliocephalus coronatus
- P. cristatus bombifrons = Viaphacops bombifrons
- P. cristatus cristatus = Viaphacops cristatus
- P. crossleii = Paciphacops crossleii
- P. cryptophthalmoides = Trimerocephalus cryptophthalmoides
- P. cryptophthalmus = Cryphops cryptophthalmus
- P. cultifrons = Eophacops trapeziceps
- P. dagincourti = Bouleia dagincourti
- P. deshayesi = Zeliszkella deshayesi
- P. downingiae var. α. vulgaris = Acaste downingiae
- P. downingiae var. β. macrops = Acastocephala macrops
- P. downingiae var. γ. inflatus = Acaste inflata
- P. ensae = Weyerites ensae
- P. fecundus = Ananaspis fecunda
- P. fecundus minor = Lochkovella minor
- P. ferdinandi = Chotecops ferdinandi
- P. glaber = Eophacops glaber
- P. glockeri = Phacopidella glockeri
- P. grimbergi = Lochkovella grimbergi
- P. handwerki = Eophacops handwerki
- P. hanusi = Lochkovella hanusi
- P. hoeninghausi = Prokops hoeninghausi
- P. hudsonicus = Paciphacops hudsonicus
- P. incisus = Nephranops incisus
- P. khatangensis = Acernaspis khatangensis
- P. kayseri = Eocryphops kayseri
- P. lacunosus = Trimerocephalus lacunosus
- P. latigenalis = Paciphacops latigenalis
- P. latilimbatus = Cryphops latilimbatus
- P. lentiginosus = Trimerocephalus lentiginosus
- P. limbatus = Dianops limbatus
- P. logani = Paciphacops logani
- P. lopatini = Monorakos lopatini
- P. mancus = Eophacops mancus
- P. marklandensis = Acernaspis marklandensis
- P. mastophthalmus = Trimerocephalus mastophthalmus
- P. metacernaspis = generic assignment uncertain
- P. michelini = Pseudocryphaeus michelini
- P. microps = Kainops microps
- P. milleri = Eldredgeops milleri
- P. miser = Lochkovella miser
- P. musheni = Eophacops musheni
- P. nudus = generic assignment uncertain
- P. ocellus = Hadrorachus ocellus
- P. opitzi = Chotecops opitzi
- P. orestes = Acernaspis orestes
- P. orientalis = Ananaspis orientalis
- P. parabolus = Phillipsinella parabola
- P. phillipsi = Kloucekia phillipsi
- P. primaevus = Acernaspis primaeva
- P. prokopi = Prokops prokopi
- P. pulcellus = Acernaspis pulcella
- P. quadrilineatus = Acernaspis quadrilineata
- P. rana = Eldredgeops rana
- P. raymondi = Kainops raymondi
- P. schlosseri = Struveops schlosseri
- P. serratus = Paciphacops serratus
- P. schlotheimi = Geesops schlotheimi
- P. socialis = Dalmanitina socialis
- P. speculator = Austerops speculator
- P. sphaericeps = Dereimsia sphaericeps
- P. steinachensis = Trimerocephalus steinachensis
- P. stellifer = Greenops (Neometacanthus) stellifer
- P. stokesii = generic assignment uncertain
- P. straitonensis = Podowrinella straitonensis
- P. trapeziceps = Eophacops trapeziceps
- P. veles = Kainops veles
- P. vodorezovi = Trimerocephalus vodorezovi
- P. volborthi = Denckmannites volborthi
- P. wocklumeriae = Weyerites wocklumeriae
