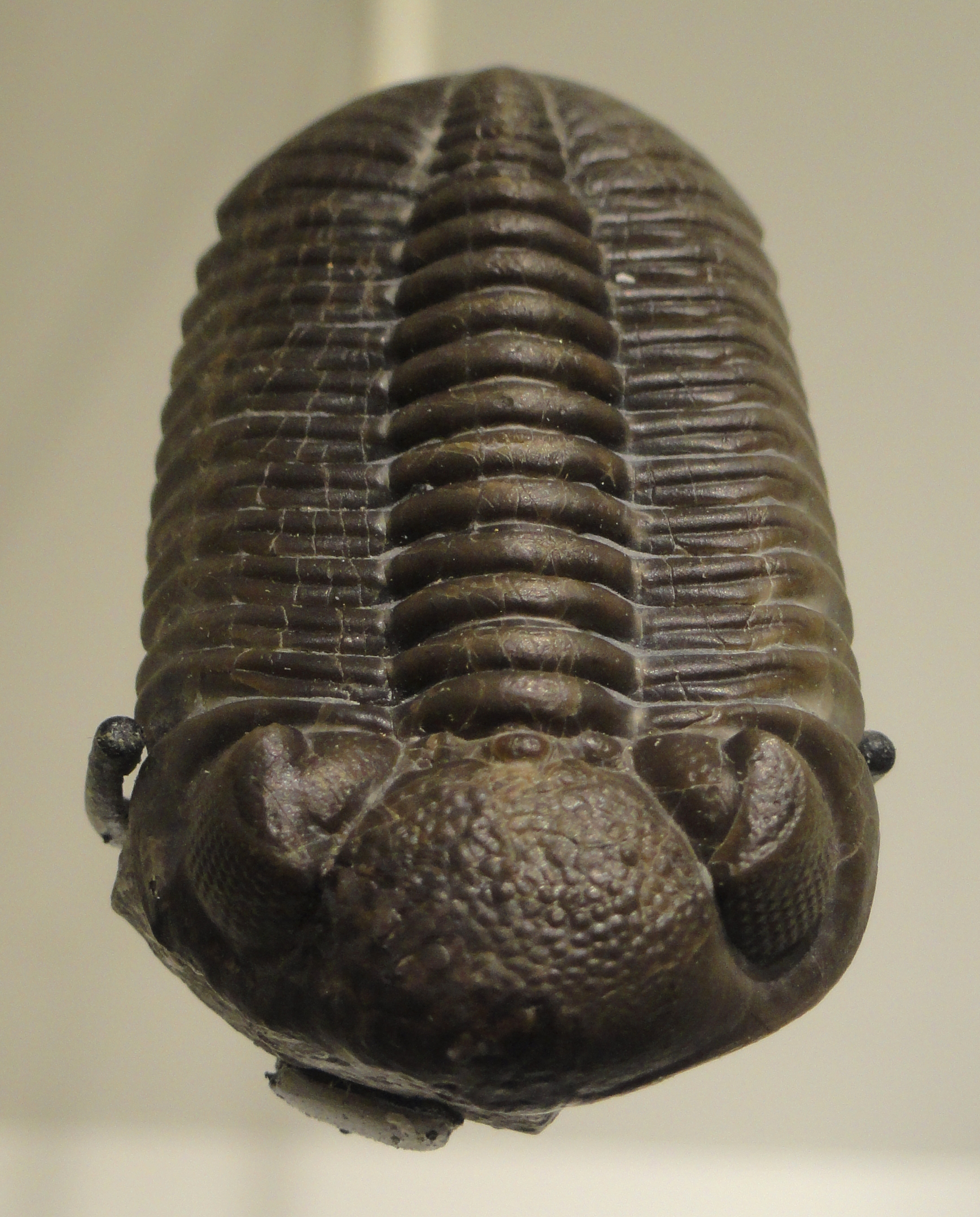
- Eldredgeops milleri

Scientific classification
- Kingdom: Animalia
- Phylum: Arthropoda
- Clade: †Artiopoda
- Class: †Trilobita
- Order: †Phacopida
- Family: †Phacopidae
- Genus: †Eldredgeops; Struve, 1990

Species
- Eldredgeops rana (Green, 1832) type, = Calymene bufo rana, Phacops rana and see text

= Eldredgeops =

Eldredgeops Temporal range: Givetian–Frasnian

Genus of trilobites

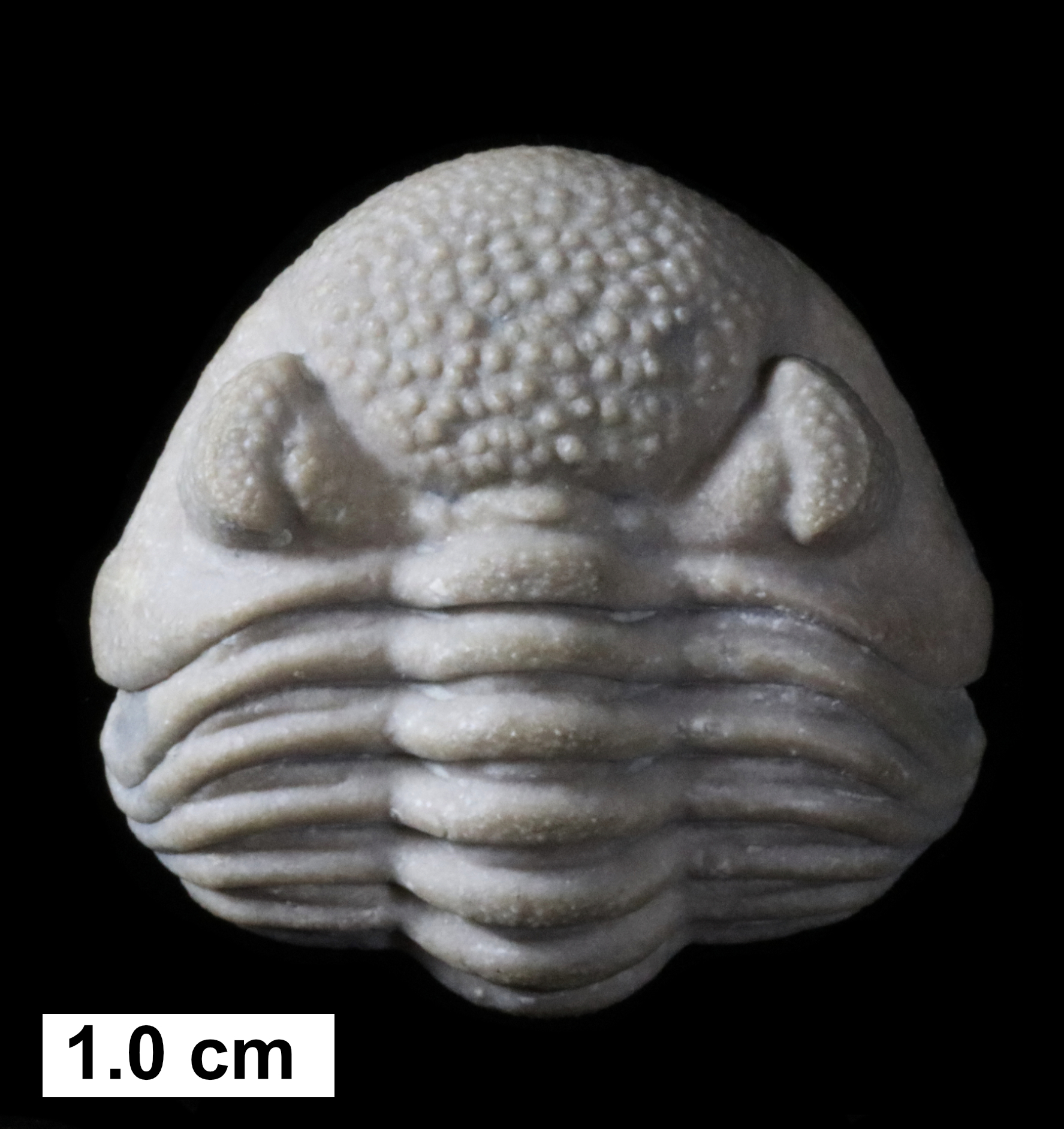
Eldredgeops norwoodensis; enrolled; Milwaukee Formation; Milwaukee County, Wisconsin.

Eldredgeops is a genus of trilobites in the order Phacopida, family Phacopidae, known from the late Middle and earliest Upper Devonian of Morocco and the USA.

== Description ==
Like in all sighted Phacopina, the eyes of Eldredgeops are composed of very large (0.5mm in Eldredgeops rana), separately set lenses without a common cornea (so called schizochroal eyes), and like almost all other Phacopina, the articulate mid-length part of the body (or thorax) in Eldredgeops has 11 segments.

In contrast to the related Phacops, Eldredgeops generally has a raised ridge along the ventral margin of the cephalon, the glabella is more inflated, the lateral parts of the preoccipital ring are rectangular (and not round), the palpebral area and palpebral lobe are larger than in P. latifrons (the type species of Phacops), and there is no fold right behind the posterior vertical row of lenses nor an isolated raised area just below the lenses.

== Distribution ==
All phacopids died out in North America during the Kačák Event at the end of the Eifelian. The phacopids returned to North America during the early Givetian with the emigration of Eldredgeops species from Morocco.

== Taxonomy ==
The species included in Eldredgeops were previously regarded as belonging to Phacops. It was considered however that the post-Eifelian North-American relatives of P. rana differ sufficiently from those found in Africa and Europe to be assigned to a separate genus. The new name is used for the North American species as the type species Phacops latifrons is European. However, old combinations like Phacops rana are widely used among fossil collectors. Pre-Givetian North-American species previously included in Phacops have also been reassigned, such as P. cristatus (now referred to Viaphacops), P. microps and P. raymondi (now Kainops), P. cambelli, P. birdsongensis, P. claviger and P. logani (now Paciphacops).

=== Species and occurrence ===
- E. rana (Green, 1832) = Phacops rana rana is present in the Givetian (Middle Cazenovian, Stafford limestone, west New York State; Iowa and adjacent states; Tioughniogan of the Appalachians and New York State) and Frasnian (Chemung sandstones, New York and Maryland).
- E. africanus (Burton & Eldredge, 1974) = P. rana africanus, occurs in Morocco
- E. crassituberculatus (Stumm, 1953) = Phacops rana crassituberculatus, appears in the Givetian (Lower Cazenovian) of the US (Delaware and Dundee Limestone, Ohio; and Soltsville siltstone, east central New York State).
- E. milleri (Stewart, 1927) = Phacops rana milleri, has been excavated from the Givetian (Middle and Upper Cazenovian, Tully Formation, New York State; Michigan and Iowa).
- E. norwoodensis (Stumm, 1953) = Phacops rana norwoodensis, found in Givetian strata (Traverse Group of Michigan, Milwaukee Formation of Wisconsin, and Cedar Valley Group of Iowa and Illinois).
- E. paucituberculatus (Eldredge, 1972) = Phacops rana paucituberculatus, can be found in the Givetian (Cazenovian) of the US (Plum Brook shale of north-central Ohio; and Upper Ferron Point shale of northeast Michigan).
- E. tindoufensis (Burton & Eldredge, 1974) = P. rana tindoufensis, is found in Morocco.
