= Boeckops =

Scientific classification
- Domain: Eukaryota
- Kingdom: Animalia
- Phylum: Arthropoda
- Class: †Trilobita
- Order: †Phacopida
- Family: †Phacopidae
- Genus: †Boeckops; Chlupac, 1972

Extinct genus of trilobites

Boeckops is a genus of trilobites in the order Phacopida, which existed in what is now the Czech Republic. It was described by Chlupac in 1972, and the type species is Boeckops boecki, which was originally described as Phacops boecki by Hawle and Corda in 1847. Boeckops is also been discriped from the lower Devonian of Morocco and Algeria. The Genus Boeckops is interpreted as intermediate from between the traditional genus concept of Phacops and Reedops. The Genus Boeckops is regarded as problematic or difficult by McKellar et Chatterton 2009.
