= Cryphops =

Cryphops Temporal range: Late Devonian

Scientific classification
- Kingdom: Animalia
- Phylum: Arthropoda
- Clade: †Artiopoda
- Class: †Trilobita
- Order: †Phacopida
- Family: †Phacopidae
- Genus: †Cryphops; Richter & Richter, 1926

Extinct genus of trilobites

Cryphops is an extinct genus of trilobite in the family Phacopidae. There are at least three described species in Cryphops.

== Species ==
These three species belong to the genus Cryphops:

- † Cryphops cryphoides
- † Cryphops cryptophthalmus
- † Cryphops tripartitus

== Palaeobiology ==
=== Life history ===
Cryphops ensae had a pattern of ontogenetic development more similar to Phacops than to Trimerocephalus.
