= Eophacops =

Eophacops Temporal range: Ordovician–Silurian

Scientific classification
- Domain: Eukaryota
- Kingdom: Animalia
- Phylum: Arthropoda
- Class: †Trilobita
- Order: †Phacopida
- Family: †Phacopidae
- Genus: †Eophacops; Delo, 1935

Species
- E. handwerki (Weller, 1907) (type) = Phacops handwerki; E. aratroideus Ramsköld, 1985; E. bulliceps (Barrande, 1846) = Phacops bulliceps; E. fontanus Holloway, 1980; E. helmuti Männing, 1987; E. lauensis Ramsköld, 1985; E. mancus (Foerste, 1919) = Phacops mancus; E. matheri Delo, 1940; E. musheni (Salter, 1864) = Phacops musheni; E. serotinus Männing, 1987; E. sprogensis Ramsköld, 1985; E. trapeziceps (Barrande, 1846) = Phacops trapeziceps, P. cultifrons

Synonyms
- Pterygometopidella

Genus of trilobites

Eophacops is a genus of trilobites from the order Phacopida, family Phacopidae. These trilobites lived during the Middle Silurian in what are now North America and North-West Europe. Species assigned to this genus can be distinguished from Phacops by their small size (2–3 cm). Eophacops has very large eyes compared to the rest of its body.
