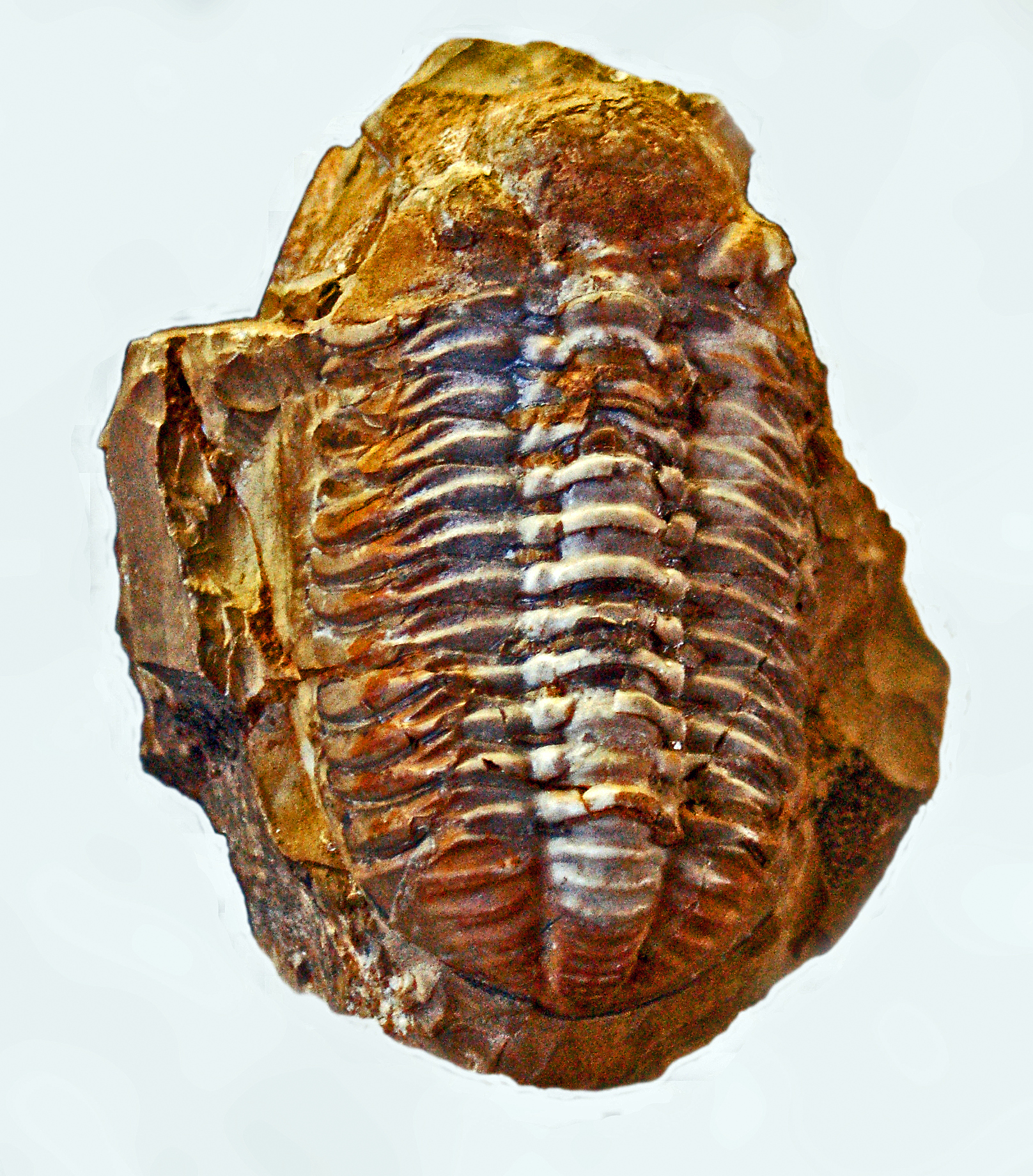
- Phacops fecundus major from Koněprusy, Czech Republic at the National Museum (Prague)

Scientific classification
- Kingdom: Animalia
- Phylum: Arthropoda
- Clade: †Artiopoda
- Class: †Trilobita
- Order: †Phacopida
- Family: †Phacopidae
- Genus: †Phacops
- Species: †P. fecundus

Binomial name
- †Phacops fecundus Barrande

Synonyms
- Ananaspis fecunda

= Phacops fecundus =

Phacops fecundus Temporal range: Devonian

Species of trilobite

Phacops fecundus is a species of trilobite from the lower Devonian period. Their fossils are found in the Czech Republic.

== Subspecies ==
- Phacops fecundus fecundus Barrande†
- Phacops fecundus major Barrande†
