= Dianops =

Scientific classification
- Domain: Eukaryota
- Kingdom: Animalia
- Phylum: Arthropoda
- Class: †Trilobita
- Order: †Phacopida
- Family: †Phacopidae
- Genus: †Dianops; Richter & Richter, 1923

Genus of trilobites

Dianops is a genus of phacopid trilobite in the order Phacopida, that existed during the upper Devonian in what is now Germany. It was described by Richter and Richter in 1923, and the type species is Dianops limbatus, which was originally described under the genus Phacops by Richter in 1848. The type locality was in Saalfeld, Thuringia.
