= Denckmannites =

Scientific classification
- Domain: Eukaryota
- Kingdom: Animalia
- Phylum: Arthropoda
- Class: †Trilobita
- Order: †Phacopida
- Family: †Phacopidae
- Genus: †Denckmannites; Wedekind, 1914

Genus of trilobites

Denckmannites is a trilobite in the order Phacopida, that existed during the upper Silurian in what is now the Czech Republic. It was described by Wedekind in 1914, and the type species is Denckmannites volborthi, which was originally described under the genus Phacops by Barrande in 1852. It also contains the species Denckmannites morator, and Denckmannites primaevus. The type locality was the Kopanina Formation.
