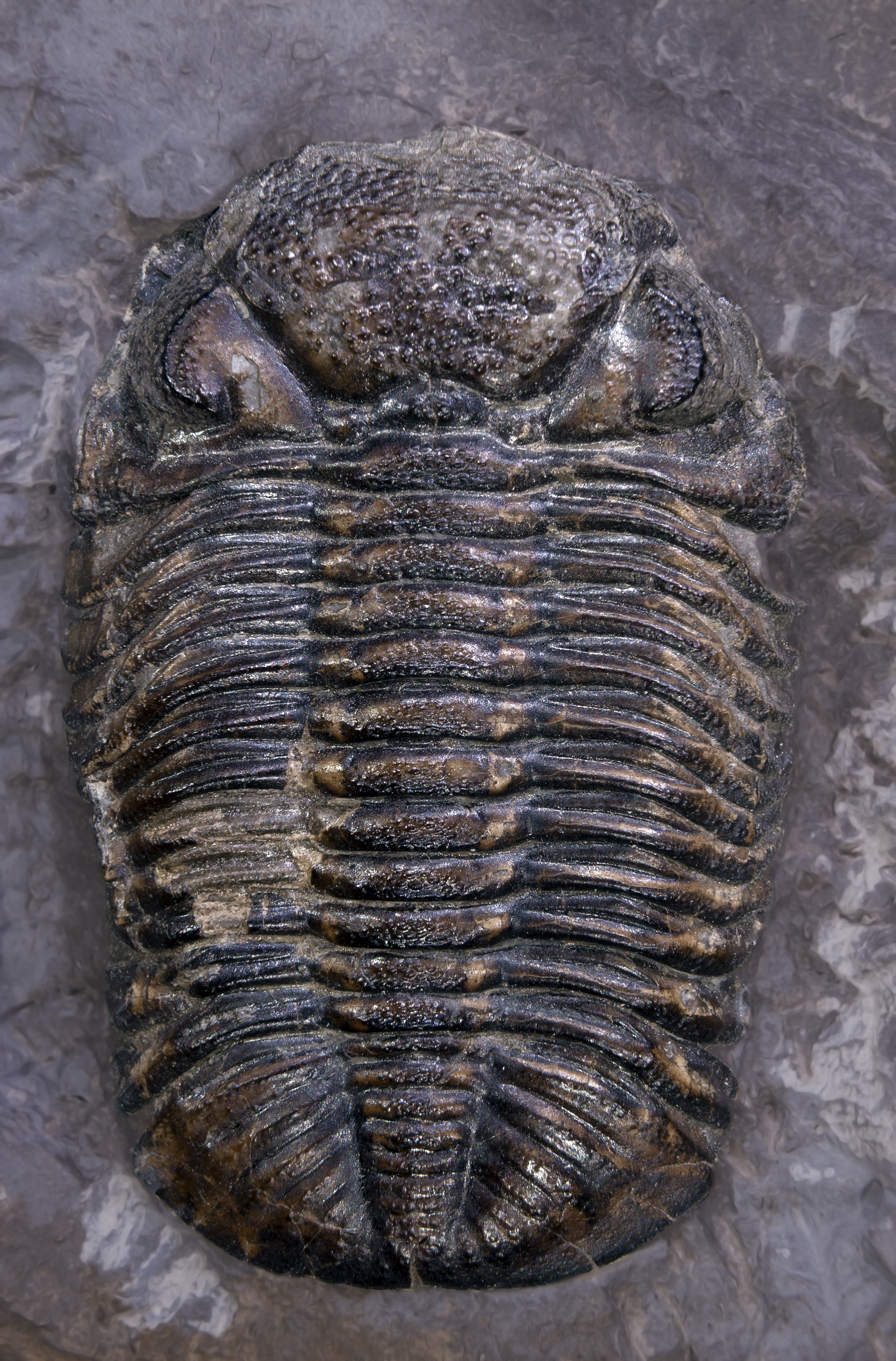

Scientific classification
- Kingdom: Animalia
- Phylum: Arthropoda
- Clade: †Artiopoda
- Class: †Trilobita
- Order: †Phacopida
- Family: †Phacopidae
- Genus: †Eldredgeops
- Species: †E. rana

Binomial name
- †Eldredgeops rana (Green, 1832)

Subspecies
- E. rana rana; E. rana africana Burton & Eldredge, 1974; E. rana crassituberculata Stumm, 1953; E. rana milleri Stewart, 1927; E. rana norwoodiensis Stumm, 1953; E. rana paucituberculata Eldredge, 1972; E. rana tindoufensis Burton & Eldredge, 1974

= Eldredgeops rana =

Eldredgeops rana Temporal range: Givetian–Frasnian

Extinct species of trilobite

Eldredgeops rana (synonym Phacops rana) is a species of trilobite from the middle Devonian period. Their fossils are found chiefly in the northeastern United States, and southwestern Ontario.

Because of its abundance and popularity with collectors, Eldredgeops rana was designated the Pennsylvania state fossil by the state's General Assembly on December 5, 1988.

== Description ==
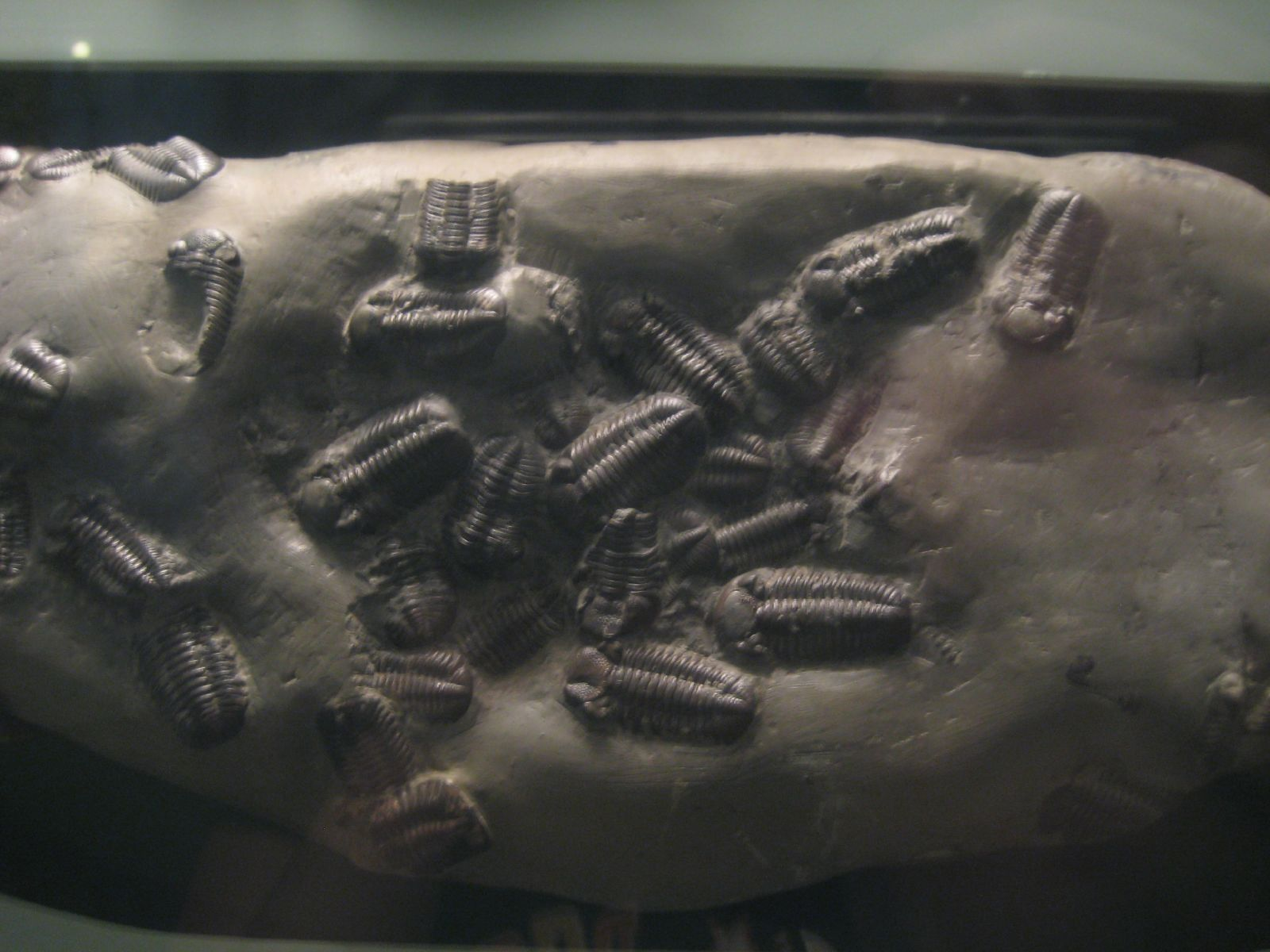
Eldredgeops rana fossils

Eldredgeops rana can be recognized by its large eyes (which remind some observers of a frog's eyes—the specific name rana is a reference to a common frog), its fairly large size (up to 6 inches long), and its habit of rolling up into a ball like a pill bug ("volvation"). In order to protect themselves from predators, Eldredgeops rana would roll into a ball with its hard exoskeleton on the outside as protection. Many other trilobites possessed the same ability, but Eldredgeops rana nearly perfected it. The slightest amount of sediment would trigger their senses, and Eldredgeops rana would be hidden in a tiny shelter made of its own body. Although this safety feature often helped them to evade predators, occasionally it backfired and the trilobite would be buried under heavy sediment. Their fossils can still be found in balled-up positions 400 million years later.

== Fossilisation ==
Eldredgeops rana is found in the northeastern U.S., southwestern Ontario, and in Morocco; North America was attached to the African Plate during the Devonian.

== Phacopid eyes ==
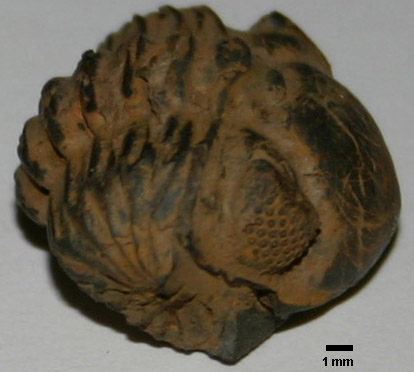
Enrolled Eldredgeops rana from an outcrop of the Middle Devonian Mahantango Formation near Milesburg, Pennsylvania, with schizochroal eye visible

The most striking feature of the morphology of Eldredgeops rana and its relatives is their eyes. These differed from the eyes of most trilobites in having comparatively few lenses spaced between deep sclera. The lenses themselves were very rounded instead of largely flat. The eyes were mounted on turret-like structures which could swivel, providing the animal with an almost 360-degree field of view. This type of eye is known as the schizochroal eye.

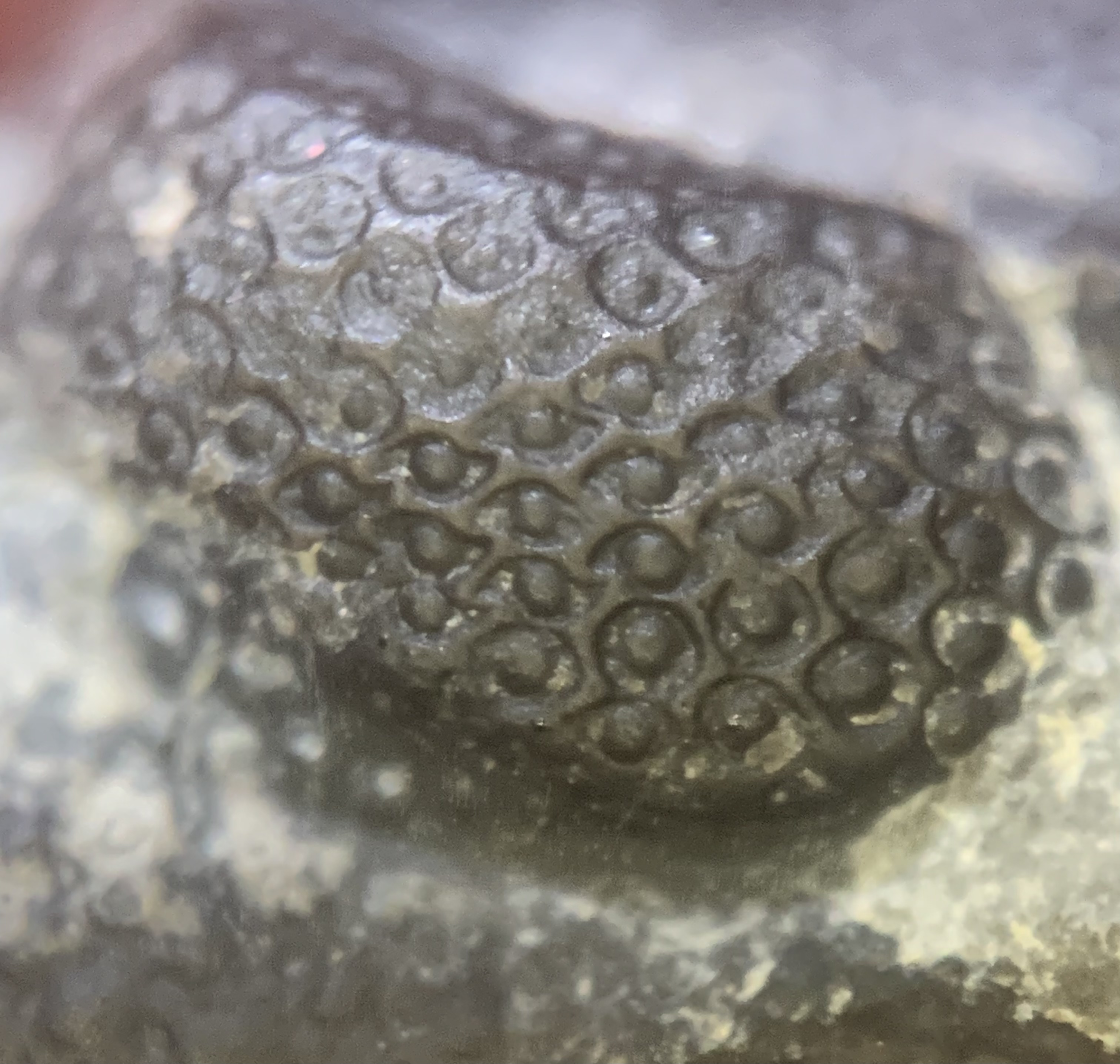
Distinguishing eye of Eldredgeops rana
