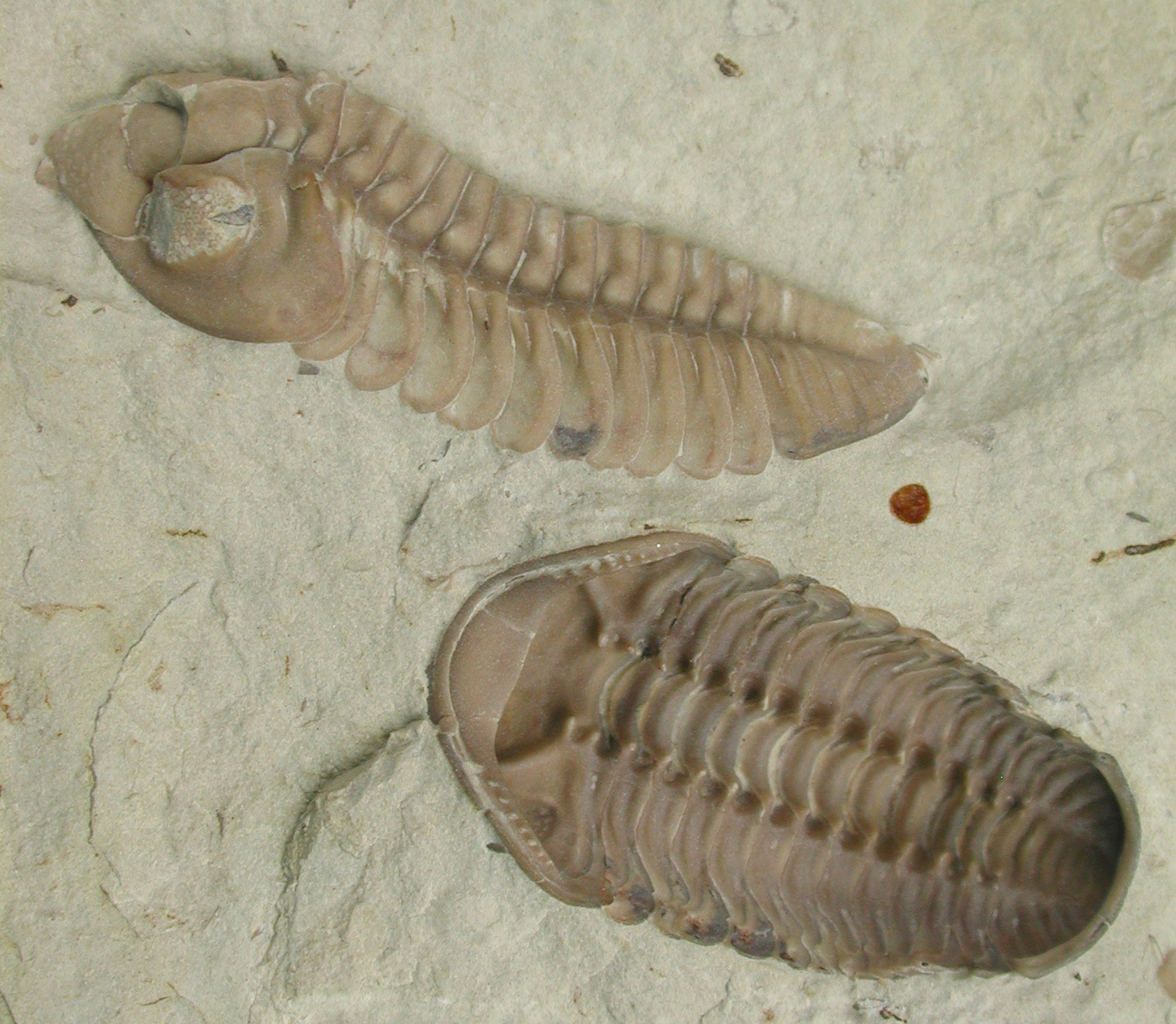
- Kainops invius

Scientific classification
- Kingdom: Animalia
- Phylum: Arthropoda
- Clade: †Artiopoda
- Class: †Trilobita
- Order: †Phacopida
- Family: †Phacopidae
- Genus: †Kainops; Ramsköld & Werdelin, 1991

Type species
- Paciphacops microps Chatterton, Johnson and Campbell, 1979

Species
- See text

= Kainops =

Kainops Temporal range: Lochkovian to Pragian

Genus of trilobites

Kainops is a genus of trilobites from the family Phacopidae, order Phacopida. It can be distinguished from Paciphacops by the greater number of facets to the eye (6–8 per row, compared to 3–4 in Paciphacops). The form of the furrow between the palpebral area and the palpebral lobe also distinguishes Kainops from the genera Paciphacops and Viaphacops.

Species included in the genus are:

- Kainops chlupaci Budil & Kolář, 2004
- Kainops ekphymus (Jones et al., 1986)
- Kainops guttulus (Campbell 1967)
- Kainops invius (Campbell 1977)
- Kainops microps (Chatterton, Johnson and Campbell, 1979)
- Kainops raymondi (Delo 1935)
- Kainops veles (Chlupac 1972)
