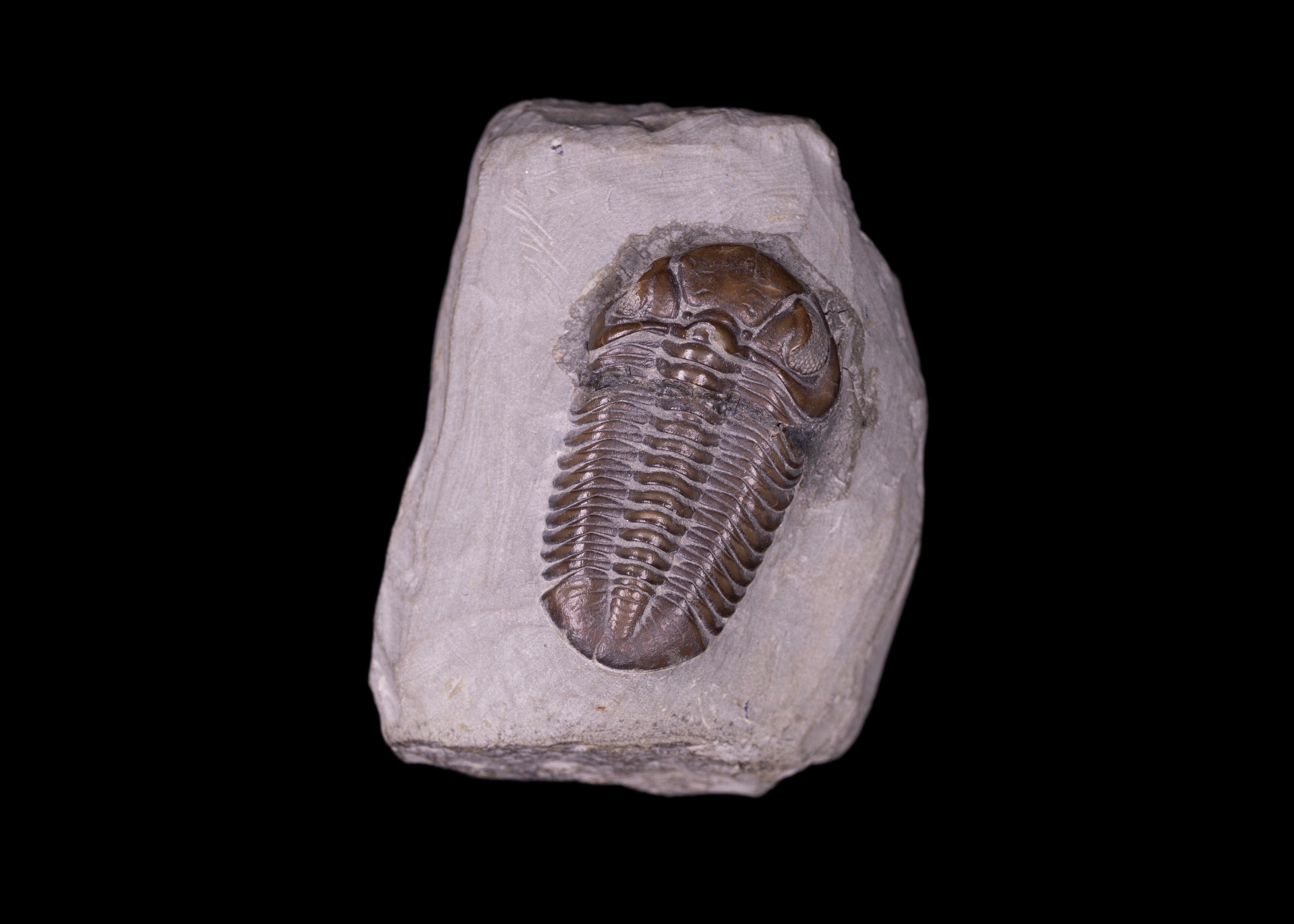
- Ananaspis stokesii

Scientific classification
- Kingdom: Animalia
- Phylum: Arthropoda
- Clade: †Artiopoda
- Class: †Trilobita
- Order: †Phacopida
- Family: †Phacopidae
- Genus: †Ananaspis; Campbell, 1967

= Ananaspis =

Genus of trilobites

Ananaspis is a genus of trilobite in the order Phacopida, which existed in what is now the Czech Republic. It was described by Campbell in 1967, and the type species is Ananaspis fecundis, which was originally described as Phacops fecundus communis by Barrande in 1852.
