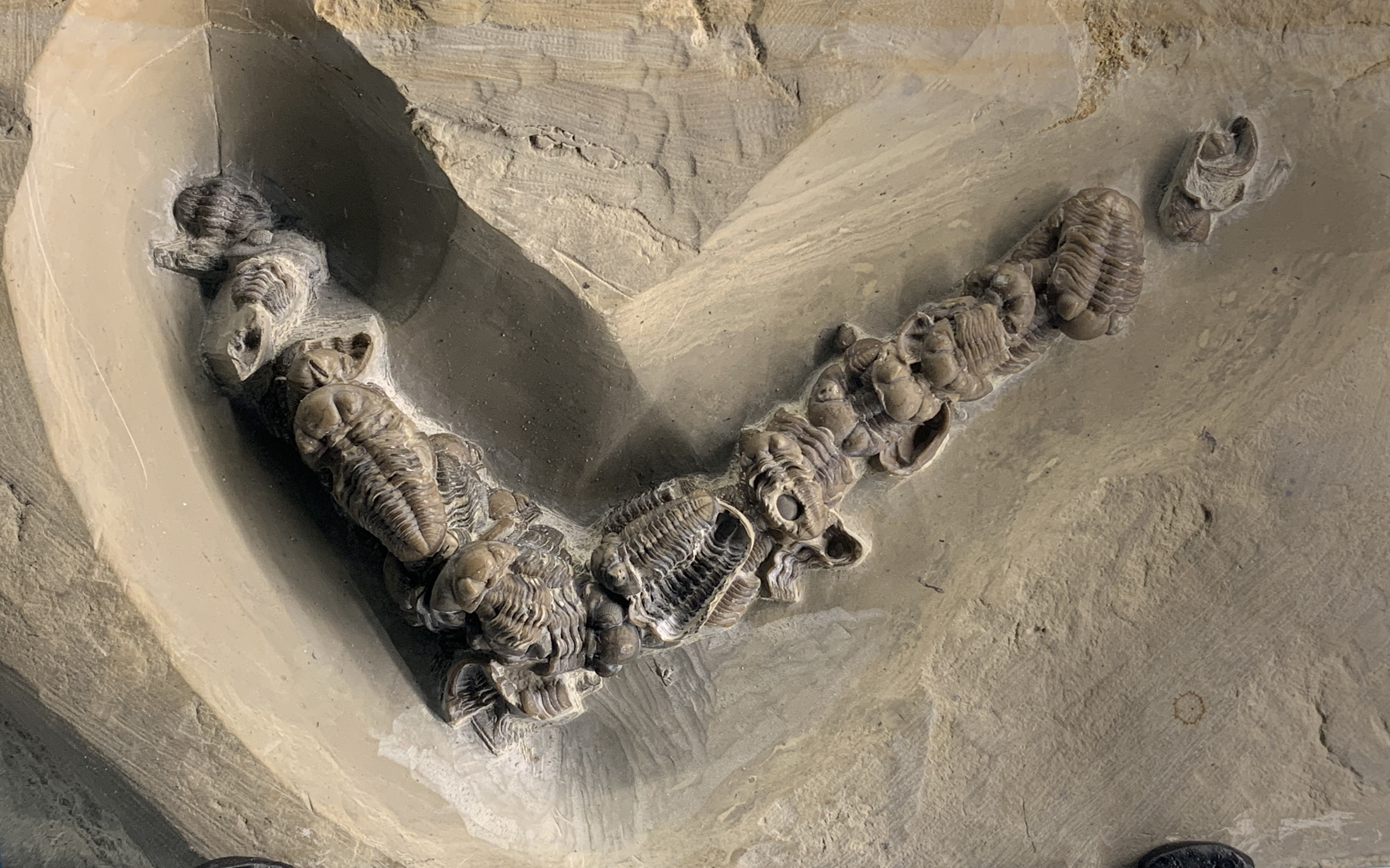
- Acernaspis orestes inside burrow, Jupiter Formation, Anticosti Island, Quebec.

Scientific classification
- Domain: Eukaryota
- Kingdom: Animalia
- Phylum: Arthropoda
- Class: †Trilobita
- Order: †Phacopida
- Family: †Phacopidae
- Genus: †Acernaspis; Campbell, 1967

Species
- Acernaspis orestes Billings, 1860 type species = Phacops orestes, A. mimica, A. superciliexcelsis

Synonyms
- Eskaspis; Murphycops

= Acernaspis =

Genus of trilobites

Acernaspis is an extinct genus of trilobite that is known from the Silurian. It contains two species, A. elliptifrons, and A. salmoensis. It is sometimes found preserved in burrows of various forms, sometimes in association with multiple moults, suggesting that it used tunnels as refuges whilst in its vulnerable moulting stage.
