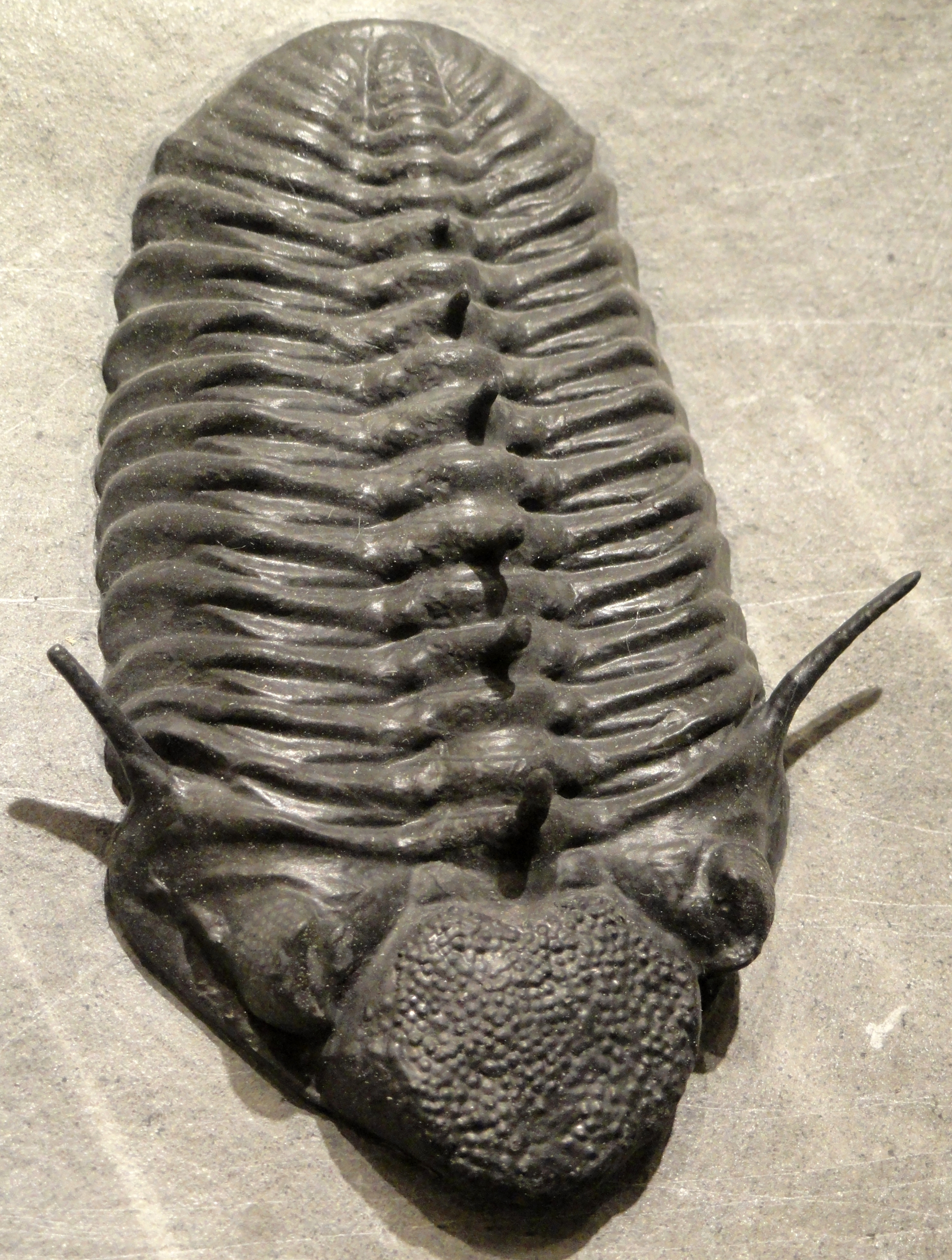
- Paciphacops claviger

Scientific classification
- Kingdom: Animalia
- Phylum: Arthropoda
- Clade: †Artiopoda
- Class: †Trilobita
- Order: †Phacopida
- Family: †Phacopidae
- Genus: †Paciphacops

Species
- See text

= Paciphacops =

Genus of trilobites

Paciphacops is a genus of trilobites within order Phacopida, suborder Phacopina. This genus is found primarily in the United States and Australia and is easily mistaken for the genera Phacops and Kainops, which are also popular among collectors. One major difference between Paciphacops and Phacops is that the central raised area (or glabella) of the headshield (or cephalon) extends beyond the headshield's anterior margin. A major difference between Paciphacops and Kainops is the greater number of eye facets in Kainops. The skin (or sclera) of the visual surface in Paciphacops is thickened and bulged compared to the edge of each lens.

== Species ==
A subset of the currently valid species of Paciphacops is below. The geographic region designated below for each species does not necessarily represent the entire geographic range for each species.

- Paciphacops birdsongensis, Tennessee.
- Paciphacops campbelli, Oklahoma.
- Paciphacops claviger, Nevada.
- Paciphacops logani, Oklahoma.
- Paciphacops crosslei, Australia.
- Paciphacops latigenalis, Australia.
