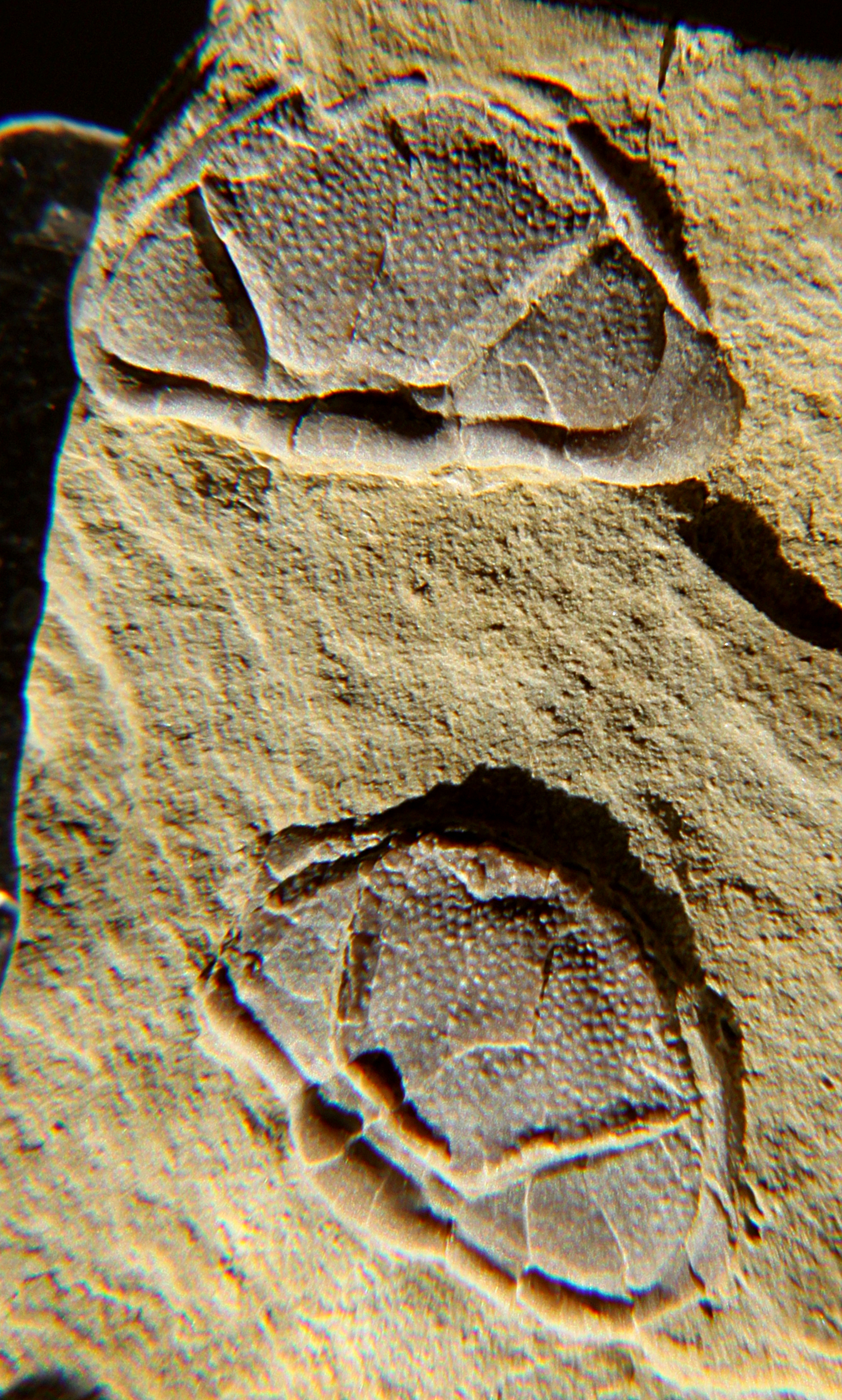
- Two cephalons of the trilobite Trimerocephalus interruptus

Scientific classification
- Kingdom: Animalia
- Phylum: Arthropoda
- Clade: †Artiopoda
- Class: †Trilobita
- Order: †Phacopida
- Family: †Phacopidae
- Genus: †Trimerocephalus; M'Coy, 1849

Species
- T. mastophthalmus Reinh. Richter, 1856 (type) synonym Phacops mastophthalmus, Trinucleus laevis; T. caecus (Gürich, 1896) synonym Phacops caecus; T. chopini Kin & Blazejowski, 2013; T. cryptophthalmoides (Maksimova, 1955) synonym Phacops cryptophthalmoides; T. dianopsoides Osmólska, 1963; T. interruptus Berkowski, 1991; T. lacunosus (Pfeiffer, 1959) synonym Phacops lacunosus; T. lelievrei Crônier & Feist, 1997; T. lentiginosus (Maksimova, 1955) synonym Phacops lentiginosus; T. mahboubii Feist in Feist, Mahboubi & Girard, 2016; T. mimbi Feist, McNamarra, Crônier & Lerosey-Aubril, 2009; T. nigritus Crônier, 2003; T. polonicus Osmólska, 1958; T. procurvus Arbizu, 1985; T. shotoriensis Feist, Yasdi & Becker, 2003; T. sponsor Chlupač, 1966; T. steinachensis (Richter & Richter, 1926) synonym Phacops steinachensis; T. tardispinosus Feist & Becker, 1997; T. trifolius (Osmólska, 1958) synonym Dianops trifolius; T. vodorezovi (Maksimova, 1955) synonym Phacops vodorezovi

Synonyms
- Eutrimerocephalus

= Trimerocephalus =

Trimerocephalus Temporal range: Famennian

Genus of trilobites

Trimerocephalus is a genus of eyeless trilobites from the order Phacopida, family Phacopidae. It lived during the final stage of the Devonian, the Famennian, and became extinct at the end of this stage, together with all other trilobites with the exception of some Proetida. It can be found in Australia, the Czech Republic, France, Germany, Iran, Kazakhstan, Morocco, Poland, the Russian Federation (Urals), Spain, and the United Kingdom (England).

== Distribution ==
Species belonging to the genus Trimerocephalus have been found in Europe, Morocco, Iran and Australia.

- T. caecus has been found in the Upper Devonian (Lower Famennian) of Poland (Holy Cross Mountains), Germany (Harz Mountains, Rhineland, Thuringia), the Russian Federation (Ural Mountains), North Africa, and France (Armorican Massif).
- T. lentiginosus has been excavated from the Upper Devonian of the Russian Federation (Famennian, South Ural Mountains).
- T. cryptophthalmoides is present in the Upper Devonian (Lower Famennian) of Kazakhstan, and the Russian Federation (South Ural Mountains).
- T. dianopsoides occurs in the Upper Devonian of Poland (Famennian, Holy Cross Mountains).
- T. interruptus is deposited in the Upper Devonian of Poland (Famennian, Holy Cross Mountains).
- T. lacunosus has been identified in the Upper Devonian of Germany (Famennian, Thuringia).
- T. lelievrei was collected in the Upper Devonian of Morocco (Famennian, Tafilalt).
- T. mastophthalmus is known from the Upper Devonian of Germany (Lower Famennian, Rhineland, Harz Mountains, Thuringia), Poland (Holy Cross Mountains), England, southwestern Asia, and Kazakhstan.
- T. mimbi has been found in the Upper Devonian of West-Australia (Famennian, McWhae Ridge, west side South Lawford Range, Virgin Hills Formation).
- T. nigritus is present in the Upper Devonian of France (lower Famennian, Red cephalopod limestones, lower member of "griottes" limestones formation, Lower Palmatolepis rhomboidea subzone, Old quarry of Concours-le-Haut near Causses-et-Veyran, Montagne Noire).
- T. polonicus occurs in the Upper Devonian of Poland (Famennian, Holy Cross Mountains).
- T. procurvus has been identified in the Upper Devonian (Famennian) of Spain (Cantabrian Mountains) and Germany.
- T. shotoriensis was excavated from the Upper Devonian of Eastern Iran (Famennian, lower Palmatolepis marginifera- to upper Palmatolepis trachytera-zone, Shotori-Range).
- T. sponsor has been identified in the Upper Devonian (Famennian) of the Czech Republic (Moravia) and Spain (Cantabrian Mountains).
- T. steinachensis is known from the Upper Devonian of Germany (Famennian, Thuringia, Harz Mountains).
- T. tardispinosus has been found in the Upper Devonian of Australia (Famennian, Palmatolepis rhomboidea-zone; McWhae Ridge, west side South Lawford Range, Virgin Hills Formation).
- T. trifolius occurs in the Upper Devonian of Poland (Famennian, Holy Cross Mountains).
- T. vodorezovi is present in the Upper Devonian of Kazakhstan (Famennian).

== Taxonomy ==
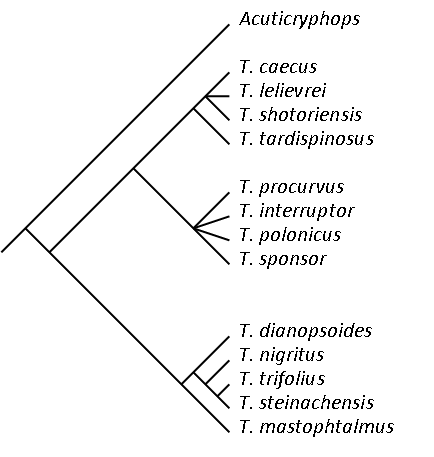
the relationships between species assigned to Trimerocephalus

Acuticryphops is probably ancestral to Trimerocephalus, and mainly differs from its descendants in having an eye lobe with a small number of lenses. Crônier, 2003, erected the subgenus Trimerocephalus (Trifoliops) containing T. trifolius and T. nigritus. In order not to be polyphyletic, T. (Trifoliops) would need to include at least T. steinachensis, and preferably T. dianopsoides as well. These species are in the same clade as T. mastophtalmus however, which is the type of the genus Trimerocephalus, which would by definition be in the nominal subgenus Trimerocephalus (Trimerocephalus). This in turn would prompt the erection of another subgenus with all remaining species shown in the cladogram.

== Description ==
Trimerocephalus is one of several phacopid genera that is eyeless (others being Dianops, Ductina, and Trimerocephaloides). The dorsal facial sutures are not functional, so cranidia and free cheeks (or librigenae) are not found separated. The marginal ridge bordering the cheeks is wide and convex. The part of the margin that is tucked-under (or doublure) and only visible when viewing the cephalon from the belly (or ventral side), is short and flat. The vincular furrow, a groove that fits the margin of the tailpiece or pygidium when the animal was enrolled, is wide and deep. The pygidium is about 3 times wider than long.

== Palaeobiology ==
=== Life history ===
As in other phacopine trilobites from the Late Devonian, in Trimerocephalus lelievrei, ontogenetic changes in size mainly occur during the holaspid phase of its life, while changes in shape primarily take place during the meraspid period.
