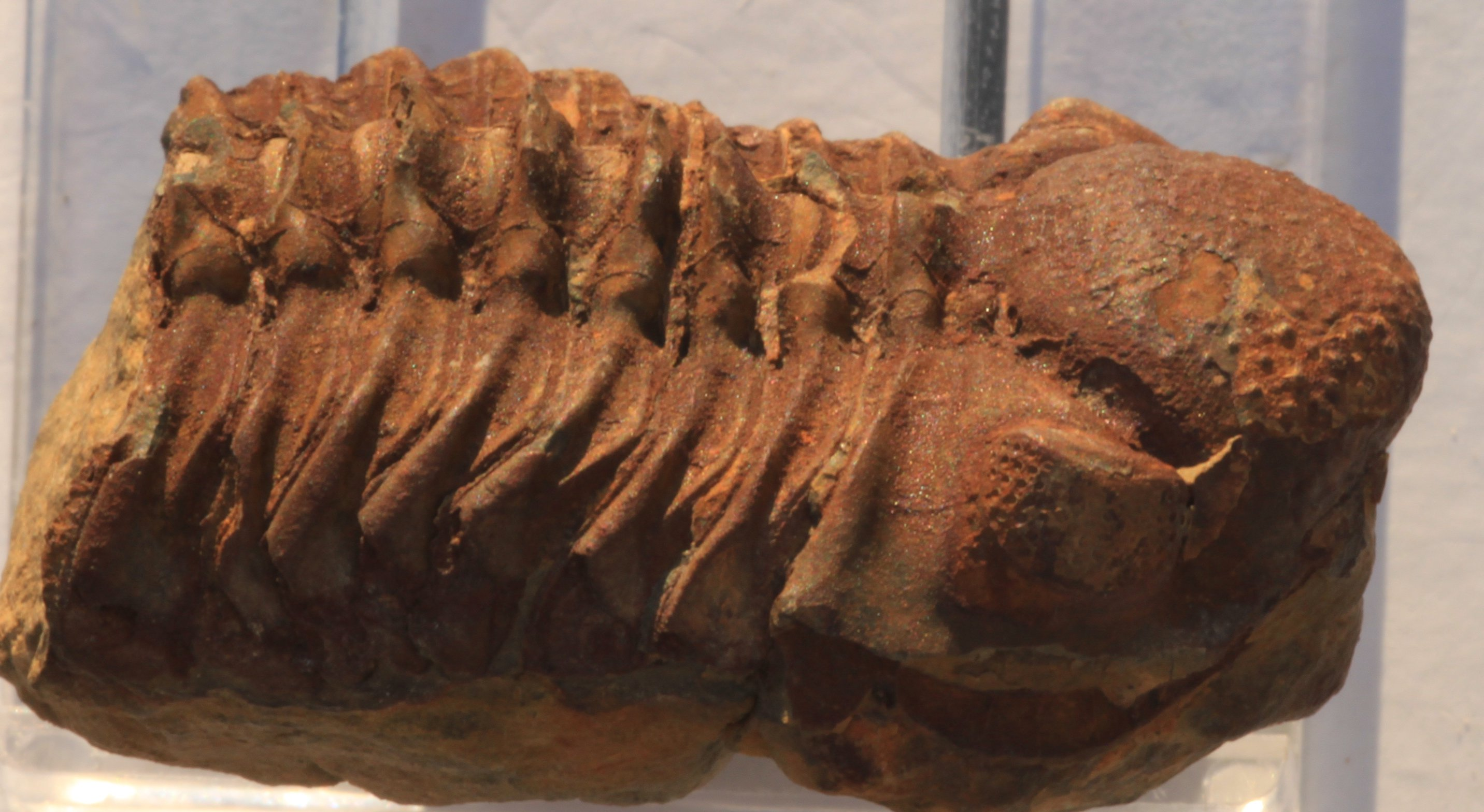
- Viaphacops multicinctus, derived intact length 45mm,↑lateral, ↓dorsal
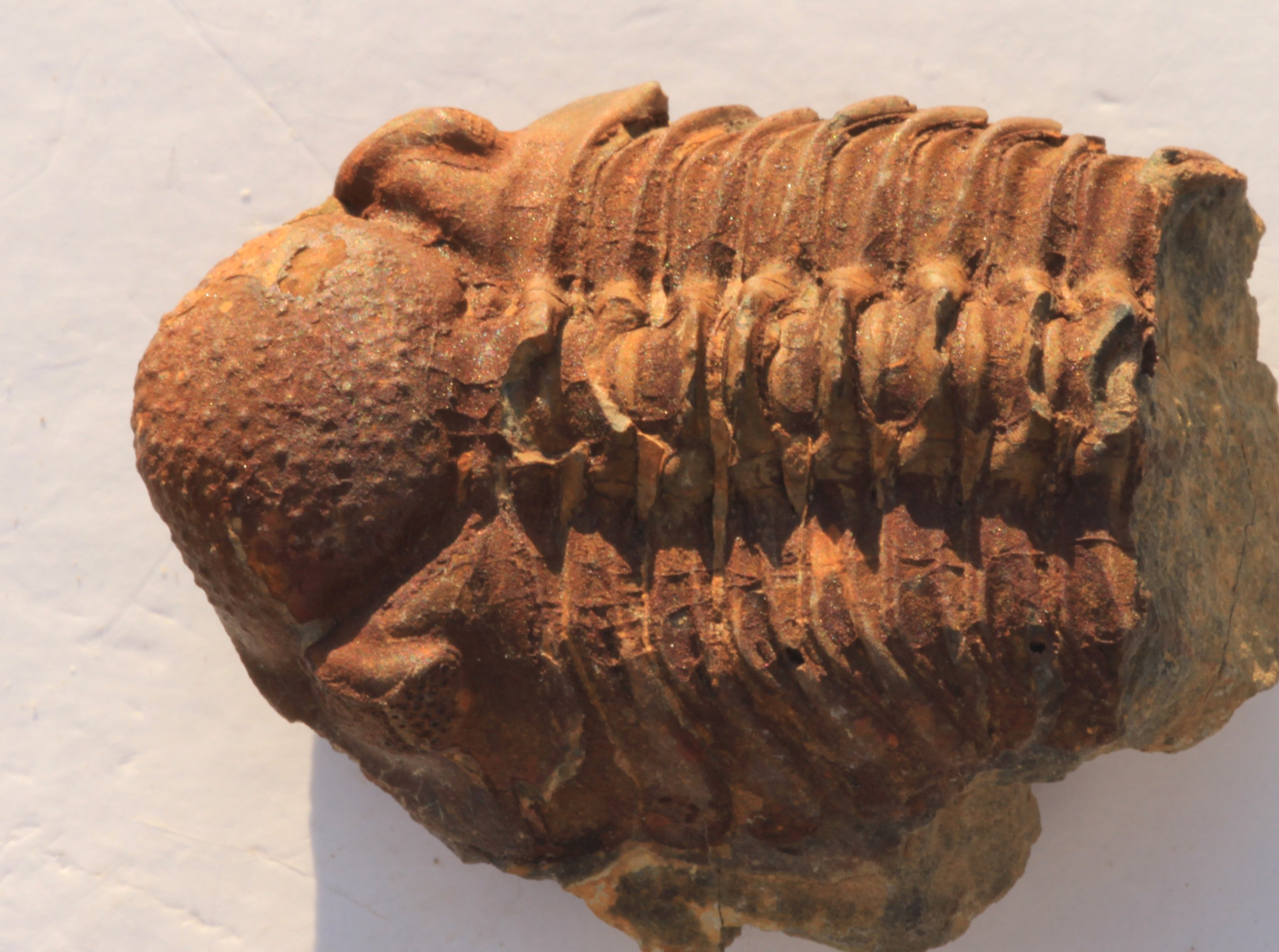

Scientific classification
- Domain: Eukaryota
- Kingdom: Animalia
- Phylum: Arthropoda
- Class: †Trilobita
- Order: †Phacopida
- Family: †Phacopidae
- Genus: †Viaphacops; Maximova, 1972

Species
- V. pipa Hall and Clarke, 1888 (type species) = Phacops pipa; V. bombifrons Hall 1961 = Phacops cristata bombifrons; V. cristata Hall, 1861 = Phacops cristata cristata; V. multicinctus Pek & Vanek, 1991; V. newelli Iwasaki, 2010; V. pirovanoi Iwasaki, 2010; V. spinoedgecombei Iwasaki, 2010; V. venezuelensis Da Gloria Pires de Carvalho & Moody, 2000

= Viaphacops =

Viaphacops Temporal range: Lochkovian-Givetian ~388–383 Ma

Extinct genus of trilobites

Viaphacops is a genus of trilobites in the order Phacopida, family Phacopidae, that lived during the Middle Devonian, and is known from North and South America (Bolivia, Floresta Formation, Altiplano Cundiboyacense, Colombia, and Venezuela), Asia (Central Kazakhstan and Far Eastern Russia).

== Description ==
Like in all sighted Phacopina, the eyes of Viaphacops are compounded of very large, separately set lenses without a common cornea (so called schizochroal eyes), and like almost all other Phacopina, the articulate mid-length part of the body (or thorax) in Viaphacops has 11 segments, the side lobes (or pleurae) are furrowed, and the articulating facets distinct.

The natural fracture lines (sutures) of the head run along the top edges of the compound eye. From the back of the eye these cut to the side of the head (proparian) and not to the back. In front of the eye, the right and left facial sutures connect in front of the inflated glabella and consequently the free cheeks (or librigenae) are yoked as a single piece. The part of the skeleton that is "tucked under" (the doublure) has no sutures crossing it to form a rostral plate. The tailshield (or pygidium) is always smaller than the headshield (or cephalon), a situation called micropygous.

In the Phacopidae a merger of the anterior and the two pairs of neighbouring lobes of the glabella forms a frontal lobe that expands forward and can be inflated and overhanging the frontal border. To the back of the glabella two furrows (or sometimes one) cross the glabella forming two rings ("intercalating/pre-occipital ring" and "occipital ring"). The cephalon does not end in genal spines. The side lobes of the thorax (or pleurae, singular pleura) have rounded ends. The pygidium is well rounded, semicircular or shorter, with an entire margin, and without lateral and posterior projections. In many Phacopidae, where the facial sutures are apparently continuous and well developed, they were evidently nonfunctional in ecdysis, since no separate free cheeks can be found.

Viaphacops is distinguished from related genera because the preoccipital furrow is merged with occipital furrow to form a deep broad furrow thus having obliterated the intercalating ring. The occipital ring itself is usually narrow. The vincular furrow, a trough in the cephalic doublure (ventral side of the border of the head) is deep, with a prominent inner border. The eyes are mostly moderate in size, but sometimes large. The tailshield is usually wide and weakly segmented. The surface of the glabella has fairly large tubercles.
