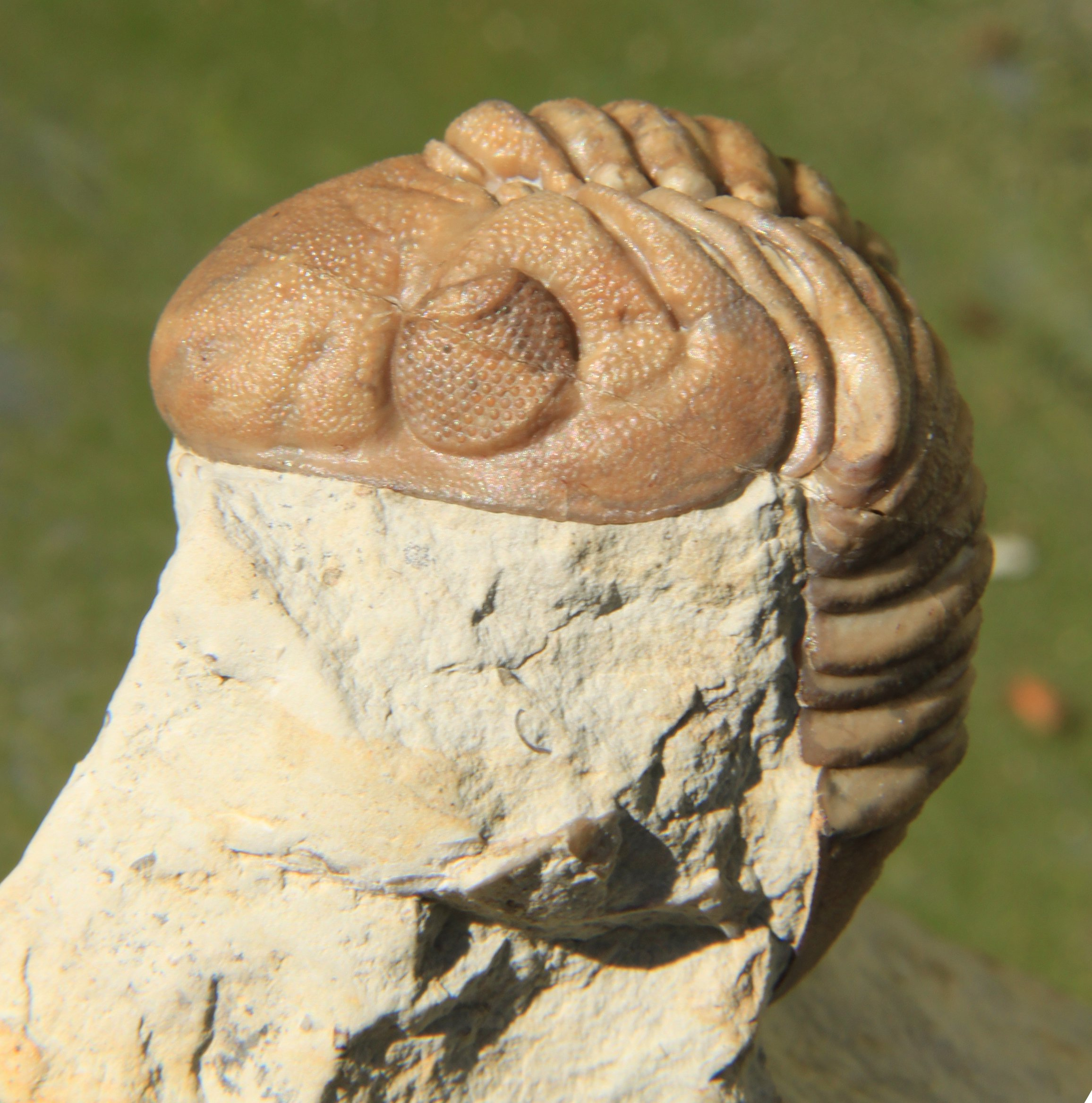
- Reedops deckeri

Scientific classification
- Domain: Eukaryota
- Kingdom: Animalia
- Phylum: Arthropoda
- Class: †Trilobita
- Order: †Phacopida
- Family: †Phacopidae
- Genus: †Reedops; Richter and Richter, 1925

= Reedops =

Reedops Temporal range: Late Pridoli - Middle Emsian, 419–403 Ma

Extinct genus of trilobite

Reedops is an extinct genus of phacopid trilobite.
