= List of prehistoric nautiloid genera =

This list of nautiloids is a comprehensive listing of all genera that have ever been included in the subclass Nautiloidea, excluding purely vernacular terms. The list includes all commonly accepted genera, but also genera that are now considered invalid, doubtful (nomina dubia), or were not formally published (nomina nuda), as well as junior synonyms of more established names, and genera that are no longer considered nautiloids.

Most of the listed genera are found in Part K of the Treatise on Invertebrate Paleontology. Some, added since the year of publication (1964) are found simply in various scientific journals and special publications. The named genera are based on type specimens which are housed in various museums and other academic institutions worldwide, available to interested researchers.

Note that Allonautilus and Nautilus are the only extant genera.

== A ==
Contents:	A B C D E F G H I J K L M N O P Q R S T U V W X Y Z — See also

- †Acanthonautilus
- †Acaroceras
- †Acleistoceras
- †Acrosphaerorthoceras
- †Actinoceras
- †Actinomorpha
- †Adamsoceras
- †Adeloceras
- †Adelphoceras
- †Adnatoceras
- †Aethiosolen
- †Aethoceras
- †Agrioceras
- †Aigoceras
- †Aipetoceras
- †Aipoceras
- †Akroceras
- †Aktjubocheilus
- †Alaskoceras
- †Albertoceras
- †Alethynoceras
- †Aletoceras
- †Alexandronautilus
- †Allanoceras
- †Alloceras
- †Allotrioceras
- †Allumettoceras
- †Almaloceras
- †Alpenoceras
- †Aluveroceras
- †Amphicyrtoceras
- †Amsleroceras
- †Anamesoceras
- †Anaspyroceras
- †Anastomoceras
- †Ancistroceras
- †Andreioceras
- †Anepheloceras
- †Angaroceras
- †Angelinoceras
- †Anglicornus
- †Anglonautlis
- †Anguloceras
- †Anhuiceras
- †Ankyloceras
- †Annoceras
- †Anomaloceras
- †Anomeioceras
- †Anonymoceras
- †Anoploceras
- †Antacaroceras
- †Anthoceras
- †Anthomorpha
- †Antigyroceras
- †Antiphragmoceras
- †Antiplectoceras
- †Antonoceras
- †Aphelaeceras
- †Aphetoceras
- †Aphractus
- †Aphragmites
- †Aphyctoceras
- †Apioceras
- †Aploceras
- †Apocrinoceras
- †Apogonoceras
- †Apsidoceras
- †Archiacoceras
- †Argocheilus
- †Arionoceras
- †Arkoceras
- †Arkonoceras
- †Armenoceras
- †Arpaoceras
- †Arterioceras
- †Arthrophyllum
- †Articheilus
- †Asaphiceras
- †Asbestoceras
- †Ascoceras
- †Askeatonolucidum
- †Astoceras
- †Asymptoceras
- †Athanatoceras
- †Atomoceras
- †Atopoceras
- †Aturia
- †Aturoidea
- †Augustoceras
- †Aulaconautilus
- †Aulametacoceras
- †Austinoceras
- †Avilionella
- †Avoceras

== B ==
Contents:	A B C D E F G H I J K L M N O P Q R S T U V W X Y Z — See also

- †Bactroceras
- †Badouceras
- †Baeopleuroceras
- †Bakeroceras
- †Balashovia
- †Balticoceras
- †Baltoceras
- †Bambusoceras
- †Barnesoceras
- †Barrandeoceras
- †Bassleroceras
- †Bastindoceras
- †Bateroboceras
- †Bathmoceras
- †Baykonaroceras
- †Beekmanoceras
- †Belloceras
- †Beloitoceras
- †Bentoceras
- †Bergoceras
- †Bickmorites
- †Bifoveoceras
- †Billingsites
- †Bistrialites
- †Bitaunioceras
- †Blakeoceras
- †Blastocerina
- †Bodieceras
- †Bodoceras
- †Bogoslovskya
- †Bohemites
- †Bolloceras
- †Brachycycloceras
- †Brachydomoceras
- †Bradfordoceras
- †Brevicoceras
- †Bridgeoceras
- †Brodekoceras
- †Broeggeroceras
- †Buchanoceras
- †Buehleroceras
- †Burenoceras
- †Buttsoceras
- †Byronoceras

== C ==
Contents:	A B C D E F G H I J K L M N O P Q R S T U V W X Y Z — See also

- †Calchasiceras
- †Calhounoceras
- †Callaionautilus
- †Calocyrtoceras
- †Cameroceras
- †Campbelloceras
- †Campendoceras
- †Campyloceras
- †Capriocornites
- †Carbactinoceras
- †Carinonautilus
- †Carlloceras
- †Carotites
- †Cartersoceras
- †Caseoceras
- †Cassinoceras
- †Casteroceras
- †Catastroboceras
- †Catoraphinoceras
- †Catyrephoceras
- †Cayogoceras
- †Cayutoceras
- †Cedarvilleoceras
- †Celox
- †Cenoceras
- †Centroceras
- †Centrocyrtoceras
- †Centrocyrtocerina
- †Centrolitoceras
- †Centroonoceras
- †Centrorizoceras
- †Centrotarphyceras
- †Chabactoceras
- †Chadwickoceras
- †Charactoceras
- †Charactocerina
- †Chazyoceras
- †Chepuloceras
- †Chicagooceras
- †Chidleyenoceras
- †Chisloceras
- †Choanoceras
- †Chouteauoceras
- †Chrysoceras
- †Chuticeras
- †Cimonia
- †Cinctoceras
- †Clarkesvillia
- †Clarkoceras
- †Clathroceras
- †Clelandoceras
- †Cliftonoceras
- †Clinoceras
- †Clionyssiceras
- †Clitendoceras
- †Clydonautilus
- †Clymenonautilus
- †Clytoceras
- †Cochlioceras
- †Codoceras
- †Coelocyrtoceras
- †Coelogasteroceras
- †Coloceras
- †Columenoceras
- †Comaroceras
- †Condraoceras
- †Conocerina
- †Conostichoceras
- †Conradoceras
- †Cooperoceras
- †Copiceras
- †Coralloceras
- †Corbuloceras
- †Cornuella
- †Corysoceras
- †Cosmonautilus
- †Cotteroceras
- †Craftonoceras
- †Cranoceras
- †Crateroceras
- †Cryptocycloceras
- †Cryptorthoceras
- †Ctenoceras
- †Cumberloceras
- †Cumingsoceras
- †Curtoceras
- †Cycloceras
- †Cyclolituites
- †Cyclopites
- †Cycloplectoceras
- †Cyclostomiceras
- †Cymatoceras
- †Cymatonautilus
- †Cyrtactinoceras
- †Cyrthoceratites
- †Cyrtobaltoceras
- †Cyrtoceras
- †Cyrtoceratites
- †Cyrtocerina
- †Cyrtocheilus
- †Cyrtogomphoceras
- †Cyrtogomphus
- †Cyrtonybyoceras
- †Cyrtorizoceras
- †Cyrtospyroceras
- †Cyrtothoracoceras

== D ==
Contents:	A B C D E F G H I J K L M N O P Q R S T U V W X Y Z — See also

- †Dakeoceras
- †Dalecarlioceras
- †Danaoceras
- †Danoceras
- †Danzikoceras
- †Dasbergoceras
- †Dawsonoceras
- †Dawsonocerina
- †Deckeroceras
- †Deiloceras
- †Deinoceras
- †Deiroceras
- †Deltoceras
- †Deltocymatoceras
- †Deltoidonautilus
- †Dentoceras
- †Desioceras
- †Devonocheilus
- †Diademoceras
- †Diagoceras
- †Diaphoroceras
- †Diastoloceras
- †Dictyoceras
- †Dideroceras
- †Diestoceras
- †Digenuoceras
- †Diodoceras
- †Diorugoceras
- †Discitoceras
- †Discoactinoceras
- †Discoceras
- †Discosorus
- †Dnestroceras
- †Doleroceras
- †Dolorthoceras
- †Domatoceras
- †Donacoceras
- †Dongshanoceras
- †Dowlingoceras
- †Drakonoceras
- †Duerleyoceras
- †Dunleithoceras
- †Dwightoceras
- †Dynatoceras
- †Dyscritoceras
- †Dzhinsetoceras

== E ==
Contents:	A B C D E F G H I J K L M N O P Q R S T U V W X Y Z — See also

- †Eburoceras
- †Ecdyceras
- †Ectenoceras
- †Ectenolites
- †Ectocycloceras
- †Ectocyrtoceras
- †Edaphoceras
- †Edenoceras
- †Ehlersoceras
- †Eichwaldoceras
- †Eifeloceras
- †Ekwanoceras
- †Elaphoceras
- †Eldroceras
- †Eleusoceras
- †Elkanoceras
- †Ellesmeroceras
- †Ellinoceras
- †Elpisoceras
- †Elrodoceras
- †Encoiloceras
- †Endoceras
- †Endocycloceras
- †Endodiscosorus
- †Endolobus
- †Endoplanoceras
- †Endoplectoceras
- †Endorioceras
- †Endostokesoceras
- †Engorthoceras
- †Enoploceras
- †Entimoceras
- †Eoclarkoceras
- †Eocyckistomiceras
- †Eocyrtoceras
- †Eodiaphragmoceras
- †Eoectenolites
- †Eorizoceras
- †Eosomichelinoceras
- †Eothinoceras
- †Eotrimeroceras
- †Eotripteroceras
- †Ephippioceras
- †Ephippiorthoceras
- †Epicymatoceras
- †Epidomatoceras
- †Epistroboceras
- †Eremoceras
- †Eridites
- †Eskimoceras
- †Esopoceras
- †Estonioceras
- †Euciphoceras
- †Eucymatoceras
- †Eudoceras
- †Euloxoceras
- †Euryrizoceras
- †Eurystomites
- †Eushantungoceras
- †Eusthenoceras
- †Eutrephoceras
- †Evlanoceras
- †Exochoceras
- †Exocyrtoceras

== F ==
Contents:	A B C D E F G H I J K L M N O P Q R S T U V W X Y Z — See also

- †Faberoceras
- †Fayettoceras
- †Flowerites
- †Floweroceras
- †Foersteoceras
- †Folioceras
- †Foordiceras
- †Franklinoceras
- †Fremontoceras
- †Fusicoceras

== G ==
Contents:	A B C D E F G H I J K L M N O P Q R S T U V W X Y Z — See also

- †Galtoceras
- †Gangshanoceras
- †Garryoceras
- †Gasconsoceras
- †Gaspocyrtoceras
- †Geisonoceras
- †Geisonocerina
- †Geisonoceroides
- †Geitonoceras
- †Georgina
- †Germanonautilus
- †Glenisteroceras
- †Glossoceras
- †Glyptodendron
- †Goldringia
- †Gomphoceras
- †Gonatocyrtoceras
- †Gonioceras
- †Gonionaedyceras
- †Gonionautilus
- †Gorbyoceras
- †Gordonoceras
- †Gorgonoceras
- †Gouldoceras
- †Graciloceras
- †Graftonoceras
- †Greenlandoceras
- †Grimsbyoceras
- †Grypoceras
- †Gryponautilus
- †Grzegorzewskia
- †Guangyuanoceras
- †Guangyuanoceroides
- †Gyroceras
- †Gyronaedyceras
- †Gzheloceras

== H ==
Contents:	A B C D E F G H I J K L M N O P Q R S T U V W X Y Z — See also

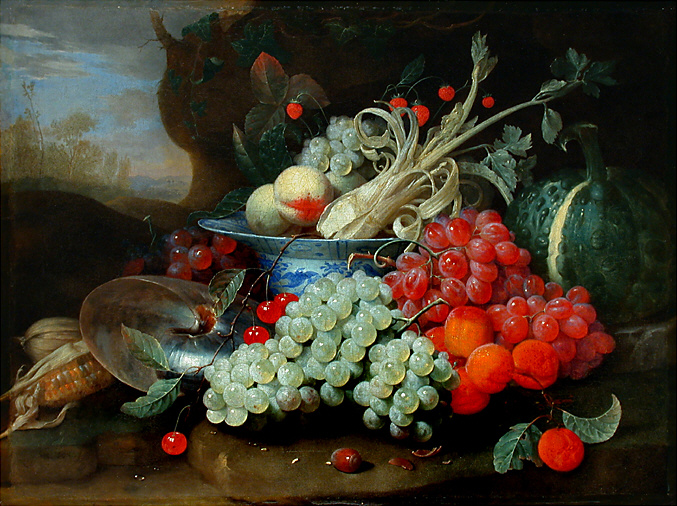

- †Hadoceras
- †Halloceras
- †Hardmanoceras
- †Harrisoceras
- †Haruspex
- †Haydenoceras
- †Hebetoceras
- †Hecatoceras
- †Hedstroemoceras
- †Helenites
- †Heloceras
- †Hemibeloitoceras
- †Hemichoanella
- †Hemicosmorthoceras
- †Hemiliroceras
- †Heminautilus
- †Hemiphragmoceras
- †Heracloceras
- †Hercoceras
- †Hercocyrtoceras
- †Hercoglossa
- †Hercoglossoceras
- †Herkimeroceras
- †Hesperoceras
- †Hexagonites
- †Hexameroceras
- †Hindeoceras
- †Hipparionoceras
- †Hiregiroceras
- †Hoeloceras
- †Holconautilus
- †Holmiceras
- †Homaloceras
- †Homoadelphoceras
- †Huaiheceras
- †Huanghuachangoceras
- †Huiaihecerina
- †Hunanoceras
- †Hunyuenoceras
- †Huronia
- †Huroniella
- †Hysteroceras

== I ==
Contents:	A B C D E F G H I J K L M N O P Q R S T U V W X Y Z — See also

- †Inclytoceras
- †Indonautilus
- †Inversoceras
- †Iowoceras
- †Irianoceras
- †Irinites
- †Isorthoceras

== J ==
Contents:	A B C D E F G H I J K L M N O P Q R S T U V W X Y Z — See also

- †Jangziceras
- †Jaregoceras
- †Jasperoceras
- †Jiagouceras
- †Joachimoceras
- †Joldagiroceras
- †Jolietoceras
- †Jonesoceras
- †Jovellania
- †Juvavionautilus

== K ==
Contents:	A B C D E F G H I J K L M N O P Q R S T U V W X Y Z — See also

- †Kadaroceras
- †Kallholnoceras
- †Karadzharoceras
- †Karoceras
- †Katageioceras
- †Kayoceras
- †Kentlandoceras
- †Keraiaceras
- †Kiaeroceras
- †Kijoceras
- †Kyminoceras
- †Kinaschukoceras
- †Kindleoceras
- †Kionoceras
- †Kitatites
- †Kladisoceras
- †Knightoceras
- †Kobyashiceras
- †Kochoceras
- †Konglungenoceras
- †Kophinoceras
- †Kosovoceras
- †Kotelnyoceras
- †Krykyloceras
- †Kummeloceras
- †Kummelonautilus
- †Kundoceras
- †Kyminoceras

== L ==
Contents:	A B C D E F G H I J K L M N O P Q R S T U V W X Y Z — See also

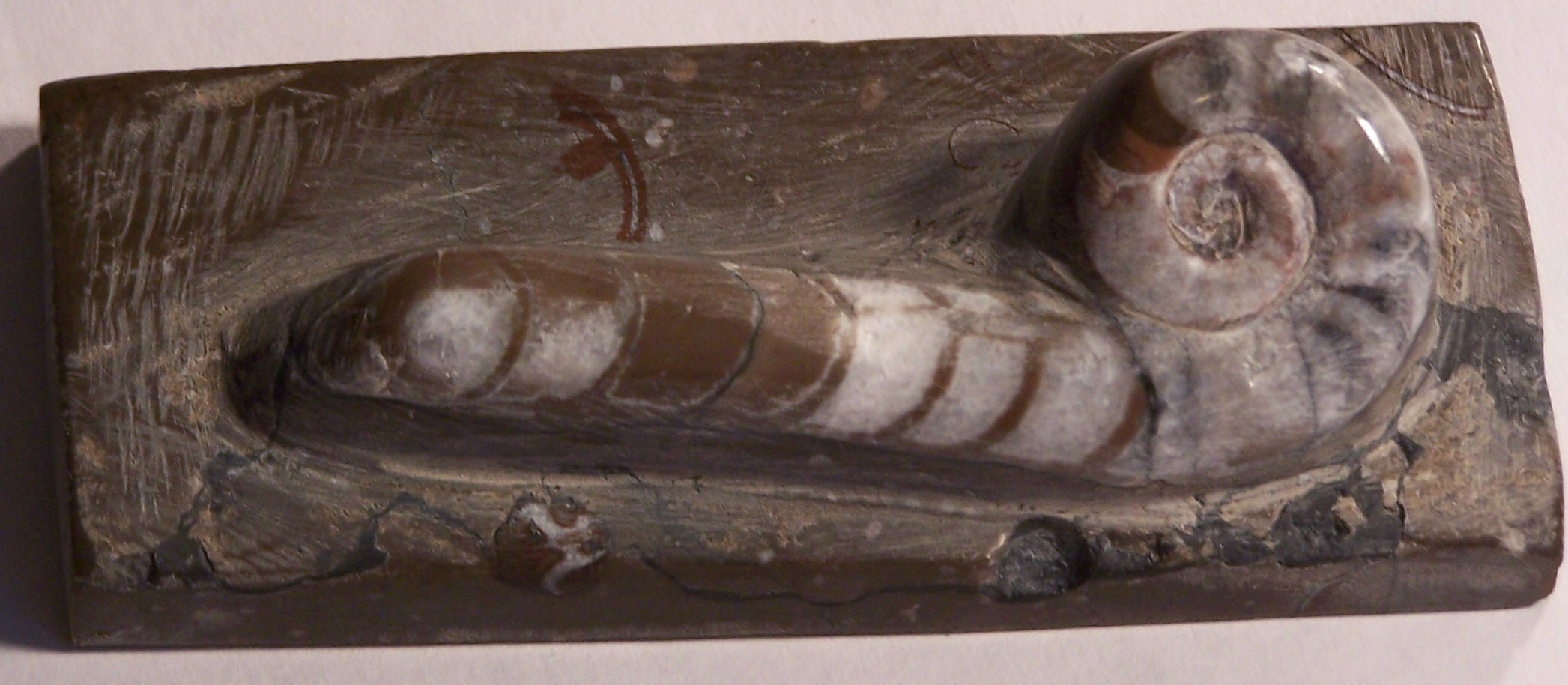
Lituites fossil.

- †Lambeoceras
- †Lamellorthoceras
- †Landeroceras
- †Laumontoceras
- †Laureloceras
- †Lavaloceras
- †Lawrenceoceras
- †Lechritrochoceras
- †Leonardoceras
- †Leuroceras
- †Leurocycloceras
- †Leurorthoceras
- †Leurotrochoceras
- †Levisoceras
- †Librovitschiceras
- †Linstroemoceras
- †Liroceras
- †Lispoceras
- †Litoceras
- †Litogyroceras
- †Lituites
- †Llanoceras
- †Lobendoceras
- †Loganoceras
- †Lophoceras
- †Lopingoceras
- †Lorieroceras
- †Lowoceras
- †Loxoceras
- †Lunanoceras
- †Lychnoceras
- †Lyckholmoceras
- †Lyecoceras
- †Lyrioceras
- †Lysagoroceras
- †Lysagoroceras

== M ==
Contents:	A B C D E F G H I J K L M N O P Q R S T U V W X Y Z — See also

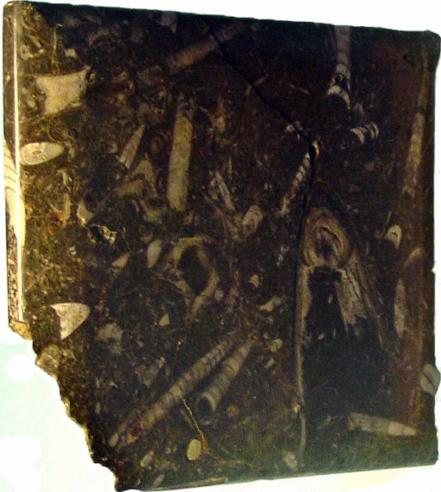
Orthoceras

- †Maccoyoceras
- †Macrodomoceras
- †Macroloxoceras
- †Madiganella
- †Maelonoceras
- †Magdoceras
- †Mahoningoceras
- †Mandaloceras
- †Manitoulinoceras
- †Manjoceras
- †Mariceras
- †Mcqueenoceras
- †Mecynoceras
- †Megadisocosorus
- †Megaglossoceras
- †Megaloceras
- †Meikeloceras
- †Meitanoceras
- †Meloceras
- †Meniscoceras
- †Menuthionautlis
- †Mericoceras
- †Mesaktoceras
- †Mesnaquaceras
- †Mesoceras
- †Mesochasmoceras
- †Metabaltoceras
- †Metacoceras
- †Metactinoceras
- †Metaphragmoceras
- †Metarizoceras
- †Metarmenoceras
- †Metaspyroceras
- †Metastromatoceras
- †Metephippiorthoceras
- †Metrioceras
- †Miamoceras
- †Michelinoceras
- †Microbaltoceras
- †Micronoceras
- †Millkoninckioceras
- †Mimolychnoceras
- †Minganoceras
- †Mitorthoceras
- †Mitroceras
- †Mixosiphonoceras
- †Mjandymoceras
- †Mnemoceras
- †Mojscaroceras
- †Mongoceras
- †Monocyrtoceras
- †Monogonoceras
- †Monomuchites
- †Montyoceras
- †Mooreoceras
- †Moreauoceras
- †Mosquoceras
- †Mstikhinoceras
- †Muiroceras
- †Multicameroceras
- †Murchisoniceras
- †Muriceras
- †Murrayoceras
- †Myloceras
- †Mysterioceras

== N ==
Contents:	A B C D E F G H I J K L M N O P Q R S T U V W X Y Z — See also

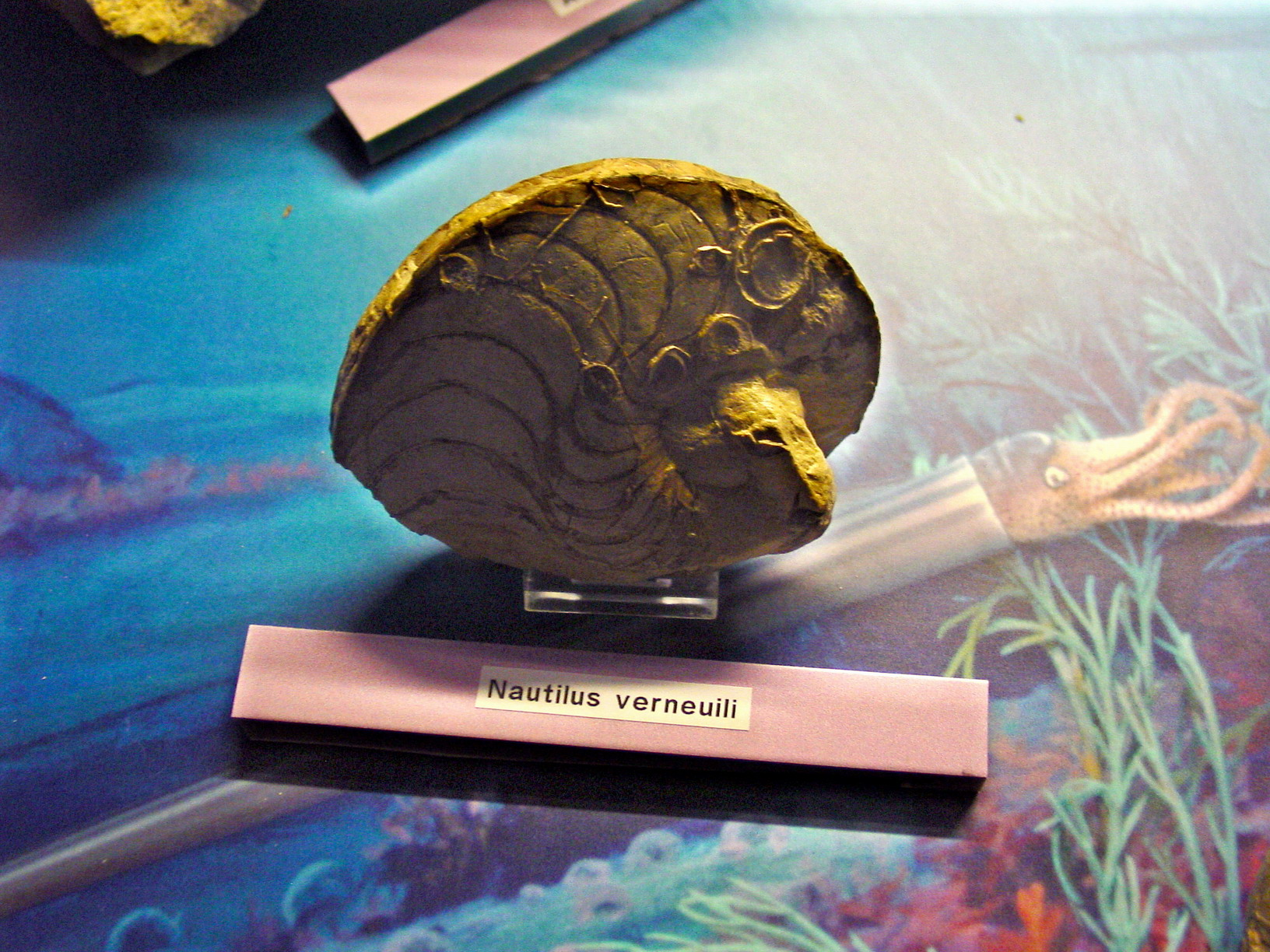
Nautilus vernuelli

- †Naedyceras
- †Najaceras
- †Nanno
- †Nassauoceras
- †Nautiloceras
- †Nebroceras
- †Neobistrialites
- †Neoceras
- †Neocycloceras
- †Neocymatoceras
- †Neodiscosorus
- †Neodomatoceras
- †Neorthoceras
- †Neosichuanoceras
- †Nephriticeras
- †Nephriticerina
- †Neptunoceras
- †Neumatoceras
- †Nikenautilus
- †Nipageroceras
- †Nothoceras
- †Notocycloceras
- †Nucites
- †Nybyoceras

== O ==
Contents:	A B C D E F G H I J K L M N O P Q R S T U V W X Y Z — See also

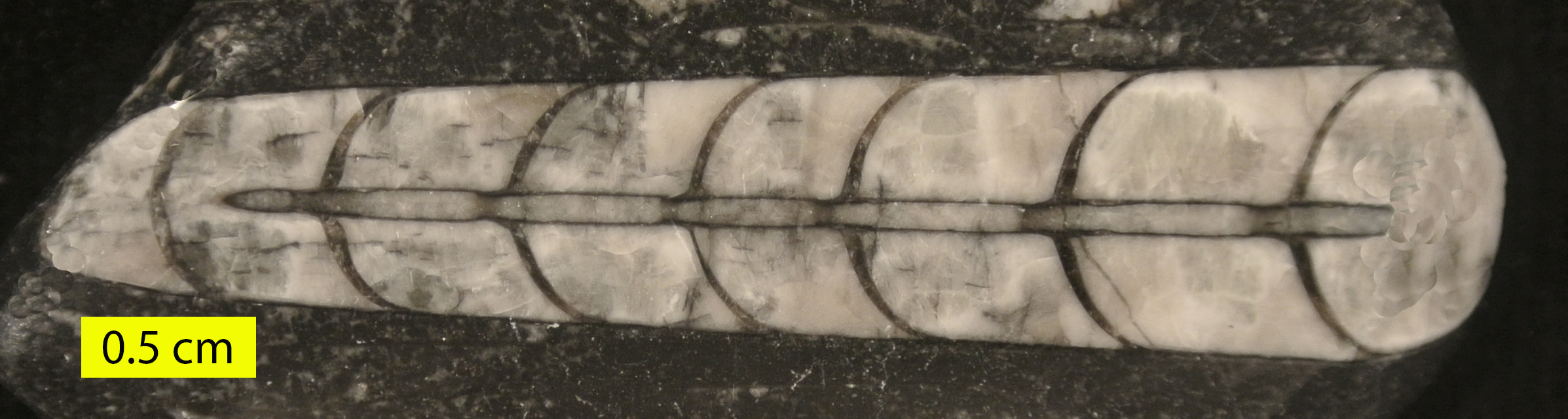
Silurian Orthoceras fossil.

- †Octamerella
- †Oelandoceras
- †Offleyoceras
- †Ogygoceras
- †Ohioceras
- †Oligoceras
- †Oncoceras
- †Oneotoceras
- †Onyxites
- †Oocerina
- †Oonoceras
- †Ophidioceras
- †Ophioceras
- †Ophionautilus
- †Oratoceras
- †Ordosoceras
- †Ormoceras
- †Orthoceras
- †Orthocycloceras
- †Orthonybyoceras
- †Osbornoceras
- †Ovoceras
- †Ovocerina
- †Oxfordoceras
- †Oxygonioceras
- †Oxynautilus

== P ==
Contents:	A B C D E F G H I J K L M N O P Q R S T U V W X Y Z — See also

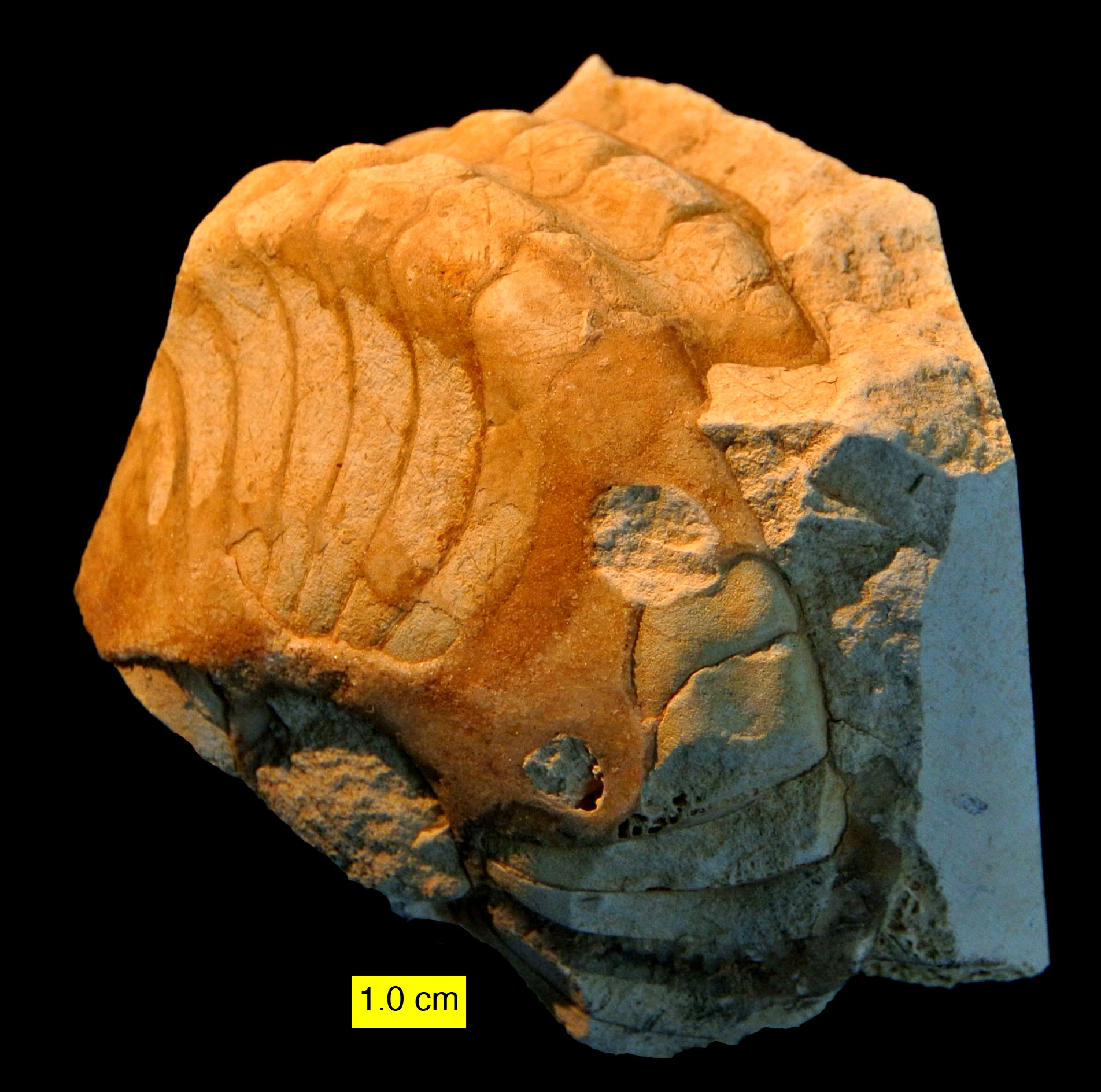
Paracenoceras (Middle Jurassic, Israel)

- †Pachendoceras
- †Pachtoceras
- †Pakrioceras
- †Palaeocycloceras
- †Palaskensis
- †Palelialia
- †Palmeroceras
- †Pancornus
- †Pantoioceras
- †Paquettoceras
- †Paracenoceras
- †Paracleistoceras
- †Paraconradoceras
- †Paractinoceras
- †Paracyclostomiceras
- †Paracymatoceras
- †Paradakeoceras
- †Paradiscoceras
- †Paradnatoceras
- †Paradomatoceras
- †Parakionoceras
- †Paraloxoceras
- †Paramecynoceras
- †Parametacoceras
- †Paramooreoceras
- †Paranautilus
- †Parapalaeoceras
- †Paraphragmites
- †Paraplectronoceras
- †Pararhiphaeoceras
- †Pararineceras
- †Parascoceras
- †Parasphaerorthoceras
- †Parastenopoceras
- †Paratrematoceras
- †Parawestonoceras
- †Parevlanoceras
- †Paroocerina
- †Parormoceras
- †Parryoceras
- †Pectinoceras
- †Peismoceras
- †Pelagoceras
- †Pentameroceras
- †Perimecoceras
- †Perioidanoceras
- †Peripetoceras
- †Permoceras
- †Permodomatoceras
- †Permonautilus
- †Perunautilus
- †Petryoceras
- †Phacoceras
- †Phaedrysmocheilus
- †Phloioceras
- †Phragmoceras
- †Phragmocerina
- †Phthanoncoceras
- †Physioceras
- †Pictetoceras
- †Piersaloceras
- †Pilotoceras
- †Pionoceras
- †Piratoceras
- †Plagioceras
- †Plagiostomoceras
- †Planetoceras
- †Platyconoceras
- †Plectoceras
- †Plectolites
- †Pleuronautilus
- †Pleuroncoceras
- †Pleurorthoceras
- †Plicatoceras
- †Plummeroceras
- †Podoliceras
- †Polydesmia
- †Polyelasmoceras
- †Polygrammoceras
- †Poterioceras
- †Poteriocerina
- †Potoceras
- †Pristeroceras
- †Probillingsites
- †Proclydonautilus
- †Procymatoceras
- †Projovellania
- †Proteoceras
- †Proterocameroceras
- †Proterovaginoceras
- †Protobactrites
- †Protocycloceras
- †Protokionoceras
- †Protophragmoceras
- †Pselioceras
- †Pseudactinoceras
- †Pseudaganides
- †Pseudancistroceras
- †Pseudaturoidea
- †Pseudendoceras
- †Pseudobolloceras
- †Pseudobrevicoceras
- †Pseudocatastroboceras
- †Pseudocenoceras
- †Pseudocycloceras
- †Pseudocyrtoceras
- †Pseudogomphoceras
- †Pseudokionoceras
- †Pseudonautilus
- †Pseudophacoceras
- †Pseudophragmoceras
- †Pseudorthoceras
- †Pseudostenopoceras
- †Pseudotemnocheilus
- †Pseudotemperoceras
- †Pseudotitanoceras
- †Psiaoceras
- †Ptenoceras
- †Ptyssoceras
- †Purmanarcoceras
- †Pycnoceras
- †Pyramidoceras
- †Pythonoceras

== Q ==
Contents:	A B C D E F G H I J K L M N O P Q R S T U V W X Y Z — See also

- †Qiushougouceras
- †Quebecoceras

== R ==
Contents:	A B C D E F G H I J K L M N O P Q R S T U V W X Y Z — See also

- †Radoceras
- †Ramussenoceras
- †Rangeroceras
- †Raphanites
- †Rasmussenoceras
- †Rayonnoceras
- †Rectseptoceras
- †Redpathoceras
- †Reedsoceras
- †Reticycloceras
- †Rhabdiferoceras
- †Rhabdites
- †Rhadinoceras
- †Rhiphaeoceras
- †Rhiphaeonautilus
- †Rhipsites
- †Rhomboceras
- †Rhomboceras
- †Rhynchoceras
- †Rhynchorthoceras
- †Richardsonoceras
- †Rineceras
- †Ringoceras
- †Rioceras
- †Rizoceras
- †Robsonoceras
- †Romingoceras
- †Ropaloceras
- †Roussanoffoceras
- †Rudolfoceras
- †Ruedemannoceras
- †Ruthenoceras
- †Rutoceras

== S ==
Contents:	A B C D E F G H I J K L M N O P Q R S T U V W X Y Z — See also

- †Sactoceras
- †Sactorthoceras
- †Saffordoceras
- †Savageoceras
- †Sceptrites
- †Schroederoceras
- †Schuchertoceras
- †Scofieldoceras
- †Scyphoceras
- †Seelyoceras
- †Selenoceras
- †Selkirkoceras
- †Shamattawaceras
- †Shantungendoceras
- †Shideleroceras
- †Shikhanoceras
- †Sholakoceras
- †Shumardoceras
- †Shuranoceras
- †Siberioceras
- †Siberionautilus
- †Sibyllonautilus
- †Sichuanaceras
- †Sigmocycloceras
- †Simardoceras
- †Simorthoceras
- †Simplicioceras
- †Sinclairoceras
- †Sinoceras
- †Sinolebetoceras
- †Slocomoceras
- †Smileoceras
- †Smithvilloceras
- †Soakinautilus
- †Solenochilus
- †Somalinautilus
- †Sophoceras
- †Spanioceras
- †Sphooceras
- †Sphyradoceras
- †Spondeioceras
- †Spyroceras
- †Stagonites
- †Standardoceras
- †Staufferoceras
- †Stearoceras
- †Stemtonoceras
- †Stenogomphoceras
- †Stenopoceras
- †Stenzeloceras
- †Stereoplasmoceras
- †Stereospyroceras
- †Stereotoceras
- †Sthenoceras
- †Stokesoceras
- †Stolbovoceras
- †Strandoceras
- †Streptoceras
- †Striacoceras
- †Strionautilus
- †Strobiloceras
- †Stroboceras
- †Stroggyloceras
- †Stromatoceras
- †Strophiceras
- †Styrionautilus
- †Subclymenia
- †Subspyroceras
- †Subvestinautilus
- †Suttonoceras
- †Sycoceras
- †Synetoceras
- †Syringoceras
- †Syringonautilus
- †Syrionautilus
- †Syrreghmatoceras
- †Systrophoceras

== T ==
Contents:	A B C D E F G H I J K L M N O P Q R S T U V W X Y Z — See also

- †Tainionautilus
- †Tainoceras
- †Tajaroceras
- †Talattoceras
- †Tambegiroceras
- †Tanchiashanites
- †Tanycameroceras
- †Taoqupoceras
- †Tarphyceras
- †Tartaroceras
- †Taskanoceras
- †Taxyceras
- †Teichertia
- †Teichertoceras
- †Temnocheilus
- †Temperoceras
- †Tetragonoceras
- †Tetrameroceras
- †Tetranodoceras
- †Tetrapleuroceras
- †Thaymastoceras
- †Therioceras
- †Theskeloceras
- †Thoracoceras
- †Threaroceras
- †Thrincoceras
- †Thuringionautilus
- †Tienoceras
- †Tirolonautilus
- †Titanoceras
- †Tithonoceras
- †Tofangoceras
- †Tomponautilus
- †Torquatoceras
- †Trachynautilus
- †Tragoceras
- †Trematoceras
- †Trematodiscus
- †Tretoceras
- †Triboloceras
- †Trigonoceras
- †Trilacinoceras
- †Trimeroceras
- †Tripleuroceras
- †Triplooceras
- †Tripteroceras
- †Tripterocerina
- †Tripteroceroides
- †Trispectes
- †Tritonoceras
- †Trochoceras
- †Trochodictyoceras
- †Trocholites
- †Trocholitoceras
- †Troedssonella
- †Troedssonoceras
- †Troostoceras
- †Tshingizoceras
- †Tubiferoceras
- †Tumidoceras
- †Tumidonautilus
- †Tunguskoceras
- †Turnoceras
- †Turoceras
- †Tuyloceras
- †Tylodiscoceras
- †Tylonautilus
- †Tylorthoceras
- †Tyrioceras

== U ==
Contents:	A B C D E F G H I J K L M N O P Q R S T U V W X Y Z — See also

- †Ukhtoceras
- †Uloceras
- †Ulrichoceras
- †Umbeloceras
- †Ungulites
- †Uralorthoceras
- †Uranoceras
- †Urtasymoceras

== V ==
Contents:	A B C D E F G H I J K L M N O P Q R S T U V W X Y Z — See also

- †Valcouroceras
- †Valhallites
- †Valhalloceras
- †Vasalemmoceras
- †Vassaroceras
- †Vaupelia
- †Venatoroceras
- †Veneficoceras
- †Ventroloboceras
- †Vericeras
- †Verticoceras
- †Vertorhizoceras
- †Vespoceras
- †Vestinautilus
- †Virgaloceras
- †Virgoceras

== W ==
Contents:	A B C D E F G H I J K L M N O P Q R S T U V W X Y Z — See also

- †Wadeoceras
- †Walcottoceras
- †Wardoceras
- †Weberoceras
- †Weishanhuceras
- †Welleroceras
- †Wellsoceras
- †Westonoceras
- †Whiteavesites
- †Whitfieldoceras
- †Wichitoceras
- †Williamsoceras
- †Wilsonoceras
- †Winnipegoceras
- †Wissenbachia
- †Wolungoceras
- †Woosteroceras
- †Worthenoceras
- †Wutinoceras

== X ==
Contents:	A B C D E F G H I J K L M N O P Q R S T U V W X Y Z — See also

- †Xainzanoceras
- †Xenoceras
- †Xenocheilus
- †Xiaoshaoceras
- †Xiphoceras

== Y ==
Contents:	A B C D E F G H I J K L M N O P Q R S T U V W X Y Z — See also

- †Yakutionautilus

== Z ==
Contents:	A B C D E F G H I J K L M N O P Q R S T U V W X Y Z — See also

- †Zeehanoceras
- †Zerashanoceras
- †Zhuibianoceras
- †Zhuralevia
- †Zittelloceras
- †Zooceras
