= Grimsbyoceras =

Grimsbyoceras Temporal range: Mid Devonian

Scientific classification
- Kingdom: Animalia
- Phylum: Mollusca
- Class: Cephalopoda
- Subclass: Nautiloidea
- Order: †Oncocerida
- Family: †Acleistoceratidae
- Genus: †Grimsbyoceras; Foerste, 1926

Grimsbyoceras is a nautiloid genus included in the Oncocerida order of the family Acleistoceratidae that lived during the Middle Devonian. They have been found in North America (Illinois) and central Europe.

Grimsbyoceras, named by Foerste in 1926, has a depressed, breviconic shell, with an elliptical transverse aperture, without a hyponomic sinus, and a small, subventral siphuncle. The phragmocone is rapidly expanding and strongly exogastric. The body chamber is attached at knee-like bends on the ventral and lateral sides.

Acleistoceras and Poteriocerina are similar acleistoceratids from the Middle Devonian, differing primarily in internal detail.
