= Tetrapleuroceras =

Tetrapleuroceras Temporal range: L Permian

Scientific classification
- Kingdom: Animalia
- Phylum: Mollusca
- Class: Cephalopoda
- Subclass: Nautiloidea
- Order: Nautilida
- Superfamily: †Aipocerataceae
- Genus: †Tetrapleuroceras; Shimansky (1957)

Extinct genus of nautiloids

Tetrapleuroceras is an extinct prehistoric nautiloid from the Lower Permian of the Urals in Russia. Nautilids are a type of nautiloid, a subclass of shelled cephalopods that were once diverse and numerous but now only represented by Nautilus and Allonautilus

Tetrapleuroceras is one of two genera that Shimianky combined as the Neptunoceratidae in 1957, the other being Neptunoceras. The Neptunoceratidae, according to Rousseau Flower (1963) is doubtfully distinct from the Scyphoceratidae, a family from the Lower Permian included in the Aipoceratoidea.(Kummel 1964.

The Scyphoceratidae, to which Tetrapleuroceras is assigned (Flower 1963) are cyrtoconic or possibly loosely coiled nautilids with smooth or ribbed shell, generally short phragmocones, and slightly expanded siphuncle segments.

== See also ==
- Nautiloid
- List of nautiloids
