= Pseudobrevicoceras =

Scientific classification
- Kingdom: Animalia
- Phylum: Mollusca
- Class: Cephalopoda
- Subclass: Nautiloidea
- Order: †Oncocerida
- Genus: †Pseudobrevicoceras

Pseudobrevicoceras is an extinct genus of nautilitoid cephalopods in the order Oncocerida. The familial position is undetermined.

Externally Pseudobrevicoceras resembles Brevicoceras, an oncocerid in the Brevicoceratidae, in having a curved, expanded, breviconic phragmocone with straight, transverse sutures.

== See also ==
- List of nautiloids
