= Neocycloceras =

Neocycloceras Temporal range: U Dev - U Miss

Scientific classification
- Kingdom: Animalia
- Phylum: Mollusca
- Class: Cephalopoda
- Order: †Pseudorthocerida
- Family: †Pseudorthoceratidae
- Genus: †Neocycloceras; Flower and Caster (1935)

Genus of molluscs

Neocycloceras is an extinct genus of nautiloid included in the Pseudorthocerida that lived during the Late Devonian and Mississippian (early Carboniferous). Neoclycloceras is characterized by a slender, generally circular shell with slightly oblique, sinuous surficial annulations. Its sutures have dorsal and ventral saddles and lateral lobes and become more oblique with age. Saddles point forward, lobes to the rear. Dorsal saddles are broad and low but the ventral ones are high and conspicuous. The siphuncle is located between the center and venter and is nummuloidal, composed of rounded expanded segments, the inside of which contains a continuous laminar lining that is thickest in the middle of the segments and thinnest at the septal necks. Neocycloceras has been found in Pennsylvania in North America and in Morocco in north Africa.

== See also ==
- List of nautiloids
- Nautiloid
  - List of prehistoric nautiloid genera
