= Naedyceras Group =

Naedyceras Group Temporal range: Middle Devonian

Scientific classification
- Kingdom: Animalia
- Phylum: Mollusca
- Class: Cephalopoda
- Subclass: Nautiloidea
- Order: Oncocerida
- Family: Brevicoceratidae

Genera
- Naedyceras; Gonionaedyceras; Gyronaedyceras

Group of nautiloids

The Naedyceras group comprises three similar and closely related openly coiled, gyroconic, genera within oncocerid family, Brevicoceratidae: Naedyceras, Gonionaedyceras, and Gyronaedyceras.

Naedyceras was named by Hyatt in 1884; Gonionaedyceras, and Gyronaedyceras by Flower in 1945. All three have open, gyroconic coiling, a subtriangular whorl section with a flattened dorsum. The siphuncle in each is ventral with flared out, cyrochoanitic septal necks and internal, longitudinal blade-like actinosiphonate deposits. All three come from the Middle Devonian of N Am, specifically New York, Ohio, and Wisconsin. Differences lie primarily in the symmetry of the whorl section and in the suture.

Naedyceras is described as having a loosely coiled low-spired coiled dextral torticonoc. or trochoidal, shell with a flattened dorsum and subtriangular whorl section. The body chamber bulges slightly. The aperture in mature specimens is somewhat contracted. Sutures form slight lateral lobes, dorsal lobes, and broad ventral and umbilical saddles. Whorl section is symmetric.

Gonionaedyceras has a strongly curved cyrtoconic shell with an asymmetric subtriangular whorl section. The inside, or dorsal, curvature is obliquely flattened and sides converge onto a narrow, ventral, outside curvature that bears a rounded to angular ridge. Sutures have dorsal and lateral lobes and umbilical and ventral saddles. Umbilical saddles are sharper on the left than on the right. Ventral saddles are rounded.

Gyronaedyceras has a compressed gyroconic shell of about two volutions with an asymmetrical, subtriangular whorl section having a broadly rounded to subangular venter and flat dorsum. Sutures are essentially straight and transverse. Actinosiphonate structures are discretely developed.

Naedyceras, most especially, outwardly resembles Stereotoceras, which in contrast has a depressed, wider than high, cross section and a beaded, nummuloidal siphuncle. Oxygonioceras is another loosely coiled brevicoceratid but in which the dorsum rounded rather than flat.
