= Gonatocyrtoceras =

Gonatocyrtoceras Temporal range: Middle Devonian

Scientific classification
- Kingdom: Animalia
- Phylum: Mollusca
- Class: Cephalopoda
- Subclass: Nautiloidea
- Order: †Oncocerida
- Family: †Acleistoceratidae
- Genus: †Gonatocyrtoceras; Foerste, 1926

Extinct genus of molluscs

Gonatocyrtoceras is a genus of oncocerid nautiloids belonging to the family Acleistoceratidae, that lived during the Middle Devonian. Gonatocyrtoceras is characterized by strongly curved, depressed, breviconic shells. Curvature is exogastric, meaning the lower, or ventral, side is convex in longitudinal profile. The aperture is without a hyponomic sinus. The siphuncle is small and subventral.

Other Devonian Acleistoceratidae are Acleistoceras, Paracleistoceras, and Poteriocerina.
