= Hercocyrtoceras =

Hercocyrtoceras Temporal range: Middle Silurian

Scientific classification
- Kingdom: Animalia
- Phylum: Mollusca
- Class: Cephalopoda
- Subclass: Nautiloidea
- Order: †Oncocerida
- Family: †Acleistoceratidae
- Genus: †Hercocyrtoceras; Foeste, 1927

Hercocyrtoceras is a middle Silurian oncocerid found in Nova Scotia and Quebec. Shells are depressed, irregularly annulated cyrtocones with V-shaped hyponomic sinuses, ornamented by longitudinal and transverse ridges. Position and structure of the siphuncle were unknown as of 1964.

Hercocyrtoceras is related to other acleisoceratid genera such as Acleistoceras, Amphycyrtoceras, and Ectocyrtoceras.
