= Pseudotemperoceras =

Pseudotemperoceras Temporal range: Triassic

Scientific classification
- Kingdom: Animalia
- Phylum: Mollusca
- Class: Cephalopoda
- Order: †Orthocerida
- Genus: †Pseudotemperoceras; Schastlivtseva, 1986

Pseudotemperoceras is an extinct genus of nautiloid cephalopods belonging to the Orthocerida from the far eastern part of the Russian Federation that lived during the Triassic from 249.7 to 245 mya, existing for approximately 4.7 million years.

== Taxonomy ==
Pseudotemperoceras was named by Schastlivtseva (1986) and is listed in the Orthocerida in Sepkoski (2002)

== Morphology ==
Pseudotemperoceras has a slender, orthoconic shell that resembles that of the earlier, Paleozoic, Temperoceras from which it gets its name, although Temperoceras is a geisonoceratid rather than an orthoceratid

== Fossil distribution ==
So far Pseudotemperoceras is known only from the western Verkhoyansk Range, Kharaulakhsk Mountains, in the Russian state of Yakutia in eastern Siberia, where it is associated with species of Trematoceras.
