= Aletoceras =

Aletoceras Temporal range: Middle Devonian

Scientific classification
- Kingdom: Animalia
- Phylum: Mollusca
- Class: Cephalopoda
- Subclass: Nautiloidea
- Order: †Oncocerida
- Family: †Brevicoceratidae
- Genus: †Aletoceras; Flower, 1938

Genus of molluscs

Aletoceras is a genus of Oncocerida nautiloids from the middle Devonian of North America included in the family Brevicoceratidae.

The shell is a depressed brevicone, that is to say short. Sutures are generally straight, the siphuncle ventral, empty. The peristome (aperture rim) has a broad hyponomic sinus -for the hydrojet funnel, ventrolateral projections, dorsolateral sinuses - possibly for the eyes, and probably a mid dorsal sinus.

In general form, Aletoceras resembles Brevicoceras and Eleusoceras, both also from the middle Devonian of North America.

The orientation of Aletoceras and others like it may have been vertical with the aperture facing down .
