= Aethiosolen =

Aethiosolen Temporal range: Middle Ordovician

Scientific classification
- Kingdom: Animalia
- Phylum: Mollusca
- Class: Cephalopoda
- Order: †Orthocerida
- Family: †Orthoceratidae
- Genus: †Aethiosolen; Flower, 1968

Genus of molluscs (fossil)

Aethiosolen is a genus of orthocerids in the family Orthoceratidae with an annulated orthoconic shell.

Annuli, transverse elevations on the shell, are broad and of low amplitude with spacings in the range of 4 to 6 mm and height of less than 1 mm. Camerae (chambers) are short, septal spacing on the order of 3 to 4 mm. The siphuncle is wide and tubular, width equal to or greater than septal spacing. Position is central or subcentral in early segments, subventral in later adult. Shells typically are narrowly conical.

Aethiosolen was named by Rousseau Flower in 1968 along with four species. The genotype which comes from the Table Head beds in Newfoundland is A. whittingtoni (Flower). Type specimens are at the Museum of Comparative Zoology at Harvard University.

Also from Newfoundland is A. priamus, renamed from Orthoceras priamus Billings 1865. Holotype also at the Museum of Comparative Zoology.

The other two, A. kayi and A. cylindricus, both also named by Flower, came from the Antelope Valley Limestone in Ikes Canyon in the Toquima Range, Nevada. The holotype of A. kayi was placed at Columbia University. A. cylindricus is in the collection of the New Mexico Museum of Natural History and Science in Albuquerque. Also there is an unidentified species of Aethiosolen with an affinity to Aethiosolen kayi and from the same locality.
