= Palaeocycloceras =

Palaeocycloceras Temporal range: Middle Ordovician

Scientific classification
- Kingdom: Animalia
- Phylum: Mollusca
- Class: Cephalopoda
- Order: †Orthocerida
- Family: †Orthoceratidae
- Genus: †Palaeocycloceras; Shimizu & Obata, 1934

Genus of molluscs (fossil)

Palaeocycloceras is a genus of Middle Ordovician orthocerids from the Baltic region of Europe, China, and Brazil.

== Taxonomy ==
Walter Sweet in 1964 assigned Palaeocycloceras to the orthocerid superfamily Orthocerataceae and to the subfamily Orthocerinae, noting that it is probably synonymous with Ctenoceras.

== Morphology ==
The shell of Palaeocycloceras (=?Ctenoceras) is straight or faintly curved upwardly (exgastric) and somewhat compressed in cross section (slightly higher than wide). The surface has prominent sinuous annulations and growth lines. The siphuncle is small, subcentral or between the center and venter. Necks are short and straight, connecting rings thin and slightly expanded at the anterior ends of the segments. In some the siphuncle has an apparently continuous parietal lining. No cameral deposits are known.
