= Thuringionautilus =

Thuringionautilus Temporal range: U Triassic

Scientific classification
- Kingdom: Animalia
- Phylum: Mollusca
- Class: Cephalopoda
- Subclass: Nautiloidea
- Order: Nautilida
- Family: †Tainoceratidae
- Genus: †Thuringionautilus; Mojsisovics, 1902

Genus of molluscs

Thuringionautilus is a genus of large, moderately involute, nautiloids from the nautilid family Tainoceratidae. The whorl section is subquadrate, flanks slightly convex, venter broad with a median furrow. Ventral shoulders, narrowly rounded to subangular; umbilical shoulders, broadly rounded. Longitudinal nodes slope diagonally backwards on the venter toward the furrow. Suture, slightly sinuous. Siphuncle, subdorsal.

Thuringionautilus, which comes from the Upper Triassic of Europe, is similar to Tainionautilus, but with smooth sides and a sharper furrow along the venter, and to Tainoceras which differs in having a wider, shallower ventral furrow and separate ventral and ventro-lateral nodes.
