= Zooceras =

Scientific classification
- Kingdom: Animalia
- Phylum: Mollusca
- Class: Cephalopoda
- Subclass: Nautiloidea
- Genus: †Zooceras

Synonyms
- Cyrtoceras rotundum; Cyrtoceras tardum

Extinct genus of nautiloids

Zooceras is an extinct genus of prehistoric nautiloids known from Pragian-aged fossils in the Prague Basin. The fossils were originally described by Joachim Barrande as species of Cyrtoceras. The shells are curved into a "C" shape.

== See also ==
- Nautiloid
  - List of nautiloids
