= Paraloxoceras =

Paraloxoceras Temporal range: L Carboniferous

Scientific classification
- Kingdom: Animalia
- Phylum: Mollusca
- Class: Cephalopoda
- Order: †Pseudorthocerida
- Family: †Pseudactinoceratidae
- Genus: †Paraloxoceras; Flower, 1939

Extinct genus of molluscs

Paraloxoceras is a genus of straight shelled, orthoconic nautiloid cephalopods, now extinct, that lived during the Early Carboniferous. Fossils have been found in Europe and central Asia; the type, P. konincki, named by Flower, came from Belgium.

The shell of Paraloxoceras is slightly depressed, with straight sutures. Septa are fairly close spaced. The siphuncle is located about halfway between the center and the venter with segments that are broadly expanded into the chambers. As typical for the subfamily, Paraloxoceras contains organic endosiphuncular deposits penetrated by a canal system similar to that found in actinocerids but differs in the having a protoconch characteristic of the pseudorthocerids. During grow of the animal the shell expands dorsally with the distance between the dorsum and siphuncle increasing while the separation between the venter and siphuncle remains at a more or less constant.

Related genera include Pseudactinoceras, Macroloxoceras, and Eusthenoceras.

== See also ==
- List of nautiloids
