= Leonardoceras =

Leonardoceras Temporal range: early Middle Ordovician

Scientific classification
- Kingdom: Animalia
- Phylum: Mollusca
- Class: Cephalopoda
- Subclass: Nautiloidea
- Order: †Oncocerida
- Family: †Graciloceratidae
- Genus: †Leonardoceras; Flower, 1968

Genus of molluscs

Leonardoceras is a genus of nautiloid cephalopods from the lower Middle Ordovician of Nevada (USA), the shell a small slender exogastric cyrtocone with the venter more narrowly rounded than the dorsum, resembling in overall form a small Bassleroceras. Septa are close spaced, the living chamber short, the siphuncle close to the venter.

The type species, Leonoardoceras parvum Flower was found the Antelope Valley limestone, in the north wall of Ikes Canyon in the Toquima Range, Nevada, about 11 feet below the top of the asaphid trilobite beds. No other species were named.

Although in basic form Leonardoceras resembles Bassleroceras, it differs in the siphuncle. bassleroceratids have thick connecting rings inherited from their ellesmeroceratid ancestors, which were passed on to the Tarphycerida. Leonardoceras has a poorly preserved, narrow siphuncle, apparently with thin connecting rings characteristic of the Oncocerida and later Nautilida.

Leonoardoceras is considered, as of ref. date, to be the most primitive of the Graciloceatidae, the ancestral family of the Oncocerida.
