= Garryoceras =

Garryoceras Temporal range: Upper Ordovician

Scientific classification
- Kingdom: Animalia
- Phylum: Mollusca
- Class: Cephalopoda
- Order: †Orthocerida
- Genus: †Garryoceras; Foerste (1925)

Genus of molluscs

Garryoceras is an extinct genus, probably from the actively mobile carnivorous cephalopod order Orthocerida, that lived in what would be North America during the Late Ordovician, from 460.5—443.7 mya, existing for approximately 16.8 million years.

== Taxonomy ==
Garryoceras was named by Foerste (1925) and was assigned to the Orthocerida by Teichert et al. (1964) Garryoceras was listed in the Endocerida by Sepkoski (2002).

== Morphology ==
The shells of Garryoceras are depressed orthocones (height less than width), described as having a flattened dorsum and more narrowly rounded venter, in other words boatlike. Camerae are short. Sutures form broad, shallow dorsal lobes and slope toward the apex going from the dorsum to the venter. The sipuncle is small, subcylindrical, and close to the venter. Internal details are unknown.

== Fossil distribution ==
Fossil distribution is exclusive to the Putnam Highland, Canada.
