= Oxygonioceras =

Oxygonioceras Temporal range: M Silurian

Scientific classification
- Kingdom: Animalia
- Phylum: Mollusca
- Class: Cephalopoda
- Subclass: Nautiloidea
- Order: †Oncocerida
- Family: †Brevicoceratidae
- Genus: †Oxygonioceras; Foerste, 1925

Genus of nautiloids

Oxygonioceras is a genus in the Oncocerid family, Brevicoceratidae, from the Middle Silurian of North America and Europe.

Oxygonioceras, named by Foeste, 1925, has a loosely coiled, dextrally torticonic shell with a rounded dorsum on the inside of the spiral and an angular or subangular venter on the outside; suture with broad lateral lobes and ventral siphuncle with expanded, nummuloidal segments.

Although also torticonically gyroconic—having an out of plane open spiral - Oxygonioceras differs from Naedyceras and closely related genera in that the siphuncle segments are empty, rather than being actinosiphonate.

== See also ==
- List of nautiloids
