= Askeatonolucidum =

Scientific classification
- Domain: Eukaryota
- Kingdom: Animalia
- Phylum: Mollusca
- Class: Cephalopoda
- Subclass: Nautiloidea
- Order: Nautilida
- Genus: †Askeatonolucidum

Extinct genus of molluscs

Askeatonolucidum is an extinct genus of prehistoric nautiloids. The nautiloids are a subclass of shelled cephalopods that were once diverse and numerous but are now represented by only a handful of species.

== See also ==
- Nautiloid
  - List of nautiloids
