= Plectolites =

Scientific classification
- Kingdom: Animalia
- Phylum: Mollusca
- Class: Cephalopoda
- Subclass: Nautiloidea
- Order: †Tarphycerida
- Family: †Trocholitidae
- Genus: †Plectolites; Flower, 1968

Genus of molluscs

Plectolites is a genus of coiled nautiloid cephalopods from Nevada (USA) that is reminiscent of the genus Plectoceras of the Barrandeocerina.

Plectolites are included in the Trocholitidae. The shell is strongly costate. Costae (ribs) slope back from the umbilical shoulder to the venter, where they become sharply elevated. Whorls are slightly eccentric, the siphuncle dorsal of the center with thick connecting rings characteristic of the order. Plectolites have a ventral siphuncle with thin connecting rings.

The type species Plectolites costatus Flower comes from the sponge beds of the Pogonip Formation in Ikes Canyon, Toquima Range, Nev. The holotype is at Columbia University in New York City. Paratypes are at the U.S. National Museum in Washington D.C. and the New Mexico Museum and Natural History and Science in Albuquerque, New Mexico.
