= Vericeras =

Vericeras Temporal range: Silurian

Scientific classification
- Kingdom: Animalia
- Phylum: Mollusca
- Class: Cephalopoda
- Order: Orthocerida
- Family: Arionoceratidae
- Genus: Vericeras Kolebaba, 1977

Type species
- Orthoceras ambigena

Genus of molluscs

Vericeras is an extinct genus of nautiloid cephalopod that lived in what would be Europe during the Silurian from 421—418.7 mya, existing for approximately 2.3 million years.

== Taxonomy ==
The type species, V. ambigena, was originally described by Joachim Barrande as "Orthoceras ambigena. Vericeras was assigned to Orthocerida by Sepkoski (2002).

== Morphology ==
The shell is an elongated orthocone with fine, longitudinal ribbing, very similar to the shells of its sister genus, Arionoceras.

== Fossil distribution ==
Fossil distribution is exclusive to Silurian marine strata in Sardinia.
