= Sactoceras =

Sactoceras Temporal range: Ordovician-Silurian

Scientific classification
- Kingdom: Animalia
- Phylum: Mollusca
- Class: Cephalopoda
- Order: Pseudorthocerida
- Family: Sactoceratidae
- Genus: Sactoceras Hyatt, 1884

Extinct genus of nautiloids

Sactoceras is an extinct nautiloid cephalopod that lived during the Ordovician and Silurian in what would become North America, Europe, and Asia.

== Taxonomy ==
The genus Sactoceras was named by Hyatt (1884). The type species is Orthoceras richteri Barrande, 1874, which comes from the Upper Silurian Ludlow Series of the Prague Basin, Czech Republic. Hyatt named Sactoceras for actinocerid species in which siphuncle segments were much reduced in diameter relative to the diameter of the shell, noting that the "siphon becomes approximately reduced . . . with age", which he interpreted as a "degradational senile shrinking". Barrande (according to Foord (1888)) considered this to indicate a reversion to the simple siphuncle of the Orthoceratidae, which might be taken to indicate a relationship to the Proteoceratidae.

Evans (2000) considered Sactoceras to be an orthocerid, placing it in the Pseudorthoceratoidea (originally Pseudorthoceratacea) of Flower and Caster, 1935, and in the family Sactoceratidae of Troedsson, 1926. The Pseudorthocerataceae is now generally regarded as a separate order, the Pseuorthocerida, within the superorder Orthoceratoidea of Wade, 1988.

== Morphology ==
Sactoceras is orthoconic, essentially straight-shelled. The cross section of the shell (or conch) and that of the siphuncle are essentially circular. The shell is moderate in size, reaching diameters of 35mm or so, and expanding at a rate of around 6 to 9 degrees.

Chambers (camerae) are moderately long with septal spacing on the order of one-third (1/3) the shell diameter. Sutures are straight, transverse. Septal concavity varies from species to species.

The siphuncle is central to subcentral in the early part of the phragmocone, but may diverge away from the center in later growth stages. Segments are expanded, increasing from diameters of around 3 to 4 mm at the septal foremina to a maximum width of around 12 to 14 mm. Septal necks are cyrtochoanitic, outwardly curved and recumbent. Siphuncle segments, in some, are faintly tear-shaped in outline with the narrow end pointing back toward the apex.

Deposits of organic calcite form at the septal formina which project forward into the subsequent chamber and line the inside of the siphuncle. These are more continuous on the ventral side of the siphuncle. Cameral deposits are also more extensive in the ventral half of the phragmocone.

== Fossil distribution ==
Fossil distribution is found from North America to Europe and Asia.
