= Hoeloceras =

Hoeloceras Temporal range: upper Ordovician

Scientific classification
- Kingdom: Animalia
- Phylum: Mollusca
- Class: Cephalopoda
- Subclass: Nautiloidea
- Genus: †Hoeloceras; Sweet 1958

Extinct genus of nautiloids

Hoeloceras is an extinct orthoconic nautiloid cephalopod from the upper Ordovician, generally included in the Actinocerida. Nautiloids are a subclass of shelled cephalopods that were once diverse and numerous but are now represented by only a couple of genera, Nautilus and Allonautilus.

Hoeloceras, which has a straight shell with a broadly curved to almost flattened venter on the underside and a more highly arched dorsum on the upper, meeting acutely on either side, was named by Walter Sweet in 1958 (Chen & Liu 1977, Teichert 1964) who first recognized it in Ordovician sediments near Oslo, Norway, and included it in the Actinocerida.

Teichert (1964) identified Hoeloceras as a synonym of Lambeoceras, as the acutely angled dorso-ventral seam suggests. Flower (1968) referred to Hoeloceras as a "flatfish", in common with Lambeoceras and Gonioceras, but reassigned it to the Reudemannoceratidae (Discosorida) noting that neither (siphuncular) annuli or parispatium - diagnostic of the Actinocerida - had been observed.

Since then specimens identified as Hoeloceras, and retained in the Actinocerida, have been discovered in China (Chen& Liu) and Korea (Yun, Cheol-Soo), where, in Korea, it is associated with the actinocerids, Armenoceras, Ormoceras, and Selkirkoceras.

== See also ==
List of nautiloids
