= Pseudorthoceratidae =

Pseudorthoceratidae Temporal range: Ordovician

Scientific classification
- Kingdom: Animalia
- Phylum: Mollusca
- Class: Cephalopoda
- Order: †Pseudorthocerida
- Family: †Pseudorthoceratidae; Flower and Caster, 1935

Extinct family of molluscs

Pseudorthoceratidae is an extinct family of actively mobile aquatic carnivorous cephalopods belonging to the subclass Orthoceratoidea. ITt is endemic to what would be North America, Asia, and Europe during the Silurian living from 460.5 to 251 Ma, existing for approximately 209.5 million years.

These animals may have been similar to the modern squid, except for the long shell. The internal structure of the shell consists of concavo-convex chambers linked by a centrally-placed tube called a siphuncle.

== Taxonomy ==
Pseudorthoceratidae was named by Flower and Caster (1935). It was assigned to Pseudorthocerataceae by Sweet (1964) and Teichert et al. (1964); to Orthocerida by Frey (1995); and to Pseudorthocerida by Barskov (1968) and Kröger (2008).
