= Orthocerataceae =

Orthocerataceae Temporal range: Lower Ordovician – Aptian

Scientific classification
- Kingdom: Animalia
- Phylum: Mollusca
- Class: Cephalopoda
- Order: †Orthocerida
- Superfamily: †Orthocerataceae; M'Coy (1844)

Extinct superfamily of molluscs

The Orthocerataceae is a superfamily of orthocerid cephalopods that lived from the late Early Ordovician to the Early Cretaceous, but is no longer in general use.

The Orthocerataceae is one of two superfamilies in the Orthocerida presented in the Treatise, the other being the Pseudorthocerataceae. With the recognition of orthocerids and pseuorthocerids as separate orders, the two superfamilies became unnecessary taxa with the Orthoceraceacea and Pseudorthocerataceae left as historical references.

As originally conceived the Orthocerataceae unites families characterized by straight or slightly curved, smooth or ornamented shells, generally with a circular cross section and tubular, centrally positioned siphuncles; given an overall range from the Lower Ordovician to the Upper Triassic. Eleven families were included, among which are the Orthoceratidae, Troedssonellidae, Dawsonoceratidae, and Paraphragmitidae. With the discovery of Zhuralevia from the Lower Cretaceous of the Caucasus by Doguzhaeva (pub 1994) the range of this group was effectively well advanced to at least late Aptian.
