= Streptoceras =

Scientific classification
- Kingdom: Animalia
- Phylum: Mollusca
- Class: Cephalopoda
- Subclass: Nautiloidea
- Order: †Oncocerida
- Family: †Acleistoceratidae
- Genus: †Streptoceras; Billings, 1866

Genus of molluscs

Streptoceras is a genus in the extinct oncocerid family Acleistoceratidae that plied the shallow sea floor from the Middle Silurian to the Middle Devonian. Streptoceras is characterized by a shell that is large but short in proportion (breviconic) with the ventral profile convex and dorsal profile concave in the posterior part, convex over the body (or living) chamber, then concave toward the front, like Amphycertoceras, but with a triangular shaped aperture. Streptoceras is found in the Middle Silurian of North America, in Ontario.

Oncocerids (Order Oncocerida) were Nautiloid cephalopods that lived during the early part of the Paleozoic Era. They are closely related to the Nautilids that include the living Nautilus, but on a different evolutionary branch.
