= Nautiloceras =

Nautiloceras Temporal range: Upper Tournaisian

Scientific classification
- Kingdom: Animalia
- Phylum: Mollusca
- Class: Cephalopoda
- Subclass: Nautiloidea
- Order: Nautilida
- Genus: †Nautiloceras; D'Orbigny, 1849

Nautiloceras is an extinct genus from the nautiloid order Nautilida, which includes the living Nautilus and its close relative Allonautilus.

Nautiloceras is a poorly known genus that probably belongs to the Trigonoceratidae. According to Kummel (1964) Nautiloceras is a jr synonym for Trigonoceras which was named by M'Coy in 1948. Different ages are given for the two however, with Nautiloceras being from the Upper Tournesian, about 352-345 Ma, (Lower Osage) and Trigonoceras somewhat younger, Upper Visean - Lower Serpukhovian, (Upper Meremec - Chester) with the span from about 340 to 322 Ma.

Nautiloceras may have been cyrtconic to loosely gyroconic, coiled without whorls being in contact with one another. Gyroconic forms may have had a subtriangular cross section with a broad concave venter, occupying the outer rim.
