= Hesperoceras =

Hesperoceras Temporal range: L Mississippian

Scientific classification
- Kingdom: Animalia
- Phylum: Mollusca
- Class: Cephalopoda
- Order: †Orthocerida
- Family: †Orthoceratidae
- Genus: †Hesperoceras; Miller & Youngquist, 1947

Genus of nautiloids

Hesperoceras is an orthocerid cephalopod belonging to the subfamily Michelinoceratinae which comes from the lower Mississippian of New Mexico.

Hesperoceras has a straight, orthoconic, shell with a subrectangular cross section. The sutures are straight and transverse on the narrow sides but form broad rounded lobes on the wide sides, and the siphuncle is small and central.
