= Galtoceras =

Scientific classification
- Kingdom: Animalia
- Phylum: Mollusca
- Class: Cephalopoda
- Subclass: Nautiloidea
- Order: †Oncocerida
- Family: †Acleistoceratidae
- Genus: †Galtoceras; Foerste, 1934

Species
- See text

Genus of nautiloids

Galtoceras is a cyrtoconic nautiloid from the Middle Silurian of North America, named by Foerste in 1934.

Galtoceras is genus of the Oncocerida and of the oncocerid family Acleistoceratidae. As with the ascleistoceratids, the curvature is exogastric, such that the lower side, or venter, is on the outside curve. The shell is elongate and slender, wider than high, with a subventral, empty, cyrtochoanitic siphuncle, with segments somewhat expanded into chambers but abruptly narrowed at septal openings.

Euryrizoceras and Tumidoceas are similar genera, also included in the Acleistoceratidae, but which are less slender than Galtoceras.
