= Balticoceras =

Balticoceras Temporal range: U Ordovician

Scientific classification
- Kingdom: Animalia
- Phylum: Mollusca
- Class: Cephalopoda
- Order: †Orthocerida
- Family: †Orthoceratidae
- Genus: †Balticoceras; Teichert 1940

Extinct genus of nautiloids

Balticoceras is a genus in the Orthocerid family, Orthoceratidae, from the Upper Ordovician of Estonia, closely related to Michelinoceras. Balticoceras is distinguished by its straight shells with a subcircular cross section, broadly flattened ventrally and evenly rounded dorsally, and by its marginal, orthochoanitic siphuncle. Balticoceras which is included in the subfamily Michelinoceratinae along with Michelinoceras should not be confused with Baltoceras which belongs in the Ellesmerocerida.
