= Franklinoceras =

Franklinoceras Temporal range: early Middle Ordovician

Scientific classification
- Kingdom: Animalia
- Phylum: Mollusca
- Class: Cephalopoda
- Subclass: Nautiloidea
- Order: †Discosorida
- Family: †Reudemannoceratidae
- Genus: †Franklinoceras; Flower (1957)

Genus of molluscs

Franklinoceras is an extinct genus of cephalopods from the nautiloid order, Discosorida. Nautiloids comprise a subclass of shelled cephalopods that were once diverse and numerous but are now represented by only a handful of species.

Franklinoceras is an early discosorid from the family Reudemannoceratidae, similar to the ancestral Reudemannoceras. Both are from the early Middle Ordovician; both have endogastric cyrtocones, except in Franklinoceras they are compressed so as to be higher than wide, rather than the other way around as in Reudemannoceras (Teichert, 1964).

== See also ==
- Reudemannoceratidae for further discussion of Reudemannoceras and Franklinoceras
  - Discosorida
- Nautiloidea
  - List of nautiloids
