= Aktjubocheilus =

Aktjubocheilus Temporal range: Famennian)

Scientific classification
- Kingdom: Animalia
- Phylum: Mollusca
- Class: Cephalopoda
- Subclass: Nautiloidea
- Order: †Oncocerida
- Family: †Acleistoceratidae
- Genus: †Aktjubocheilus

Extinct genus of molluscs

Aktjubocheilus is a genus of oncocerid nautiloids from the Upper Devonian (M Famenian) included in the Acleistoceratidae, a family characterized by depressed, or rarely compressed, exogastric brevicones and cyrtocones.
