= Eotripteroceras =

Eotripteroceras Temporal range: M Ordovician

Scientific classification
- Kingdom: Animalia
- Phylum: Mollusca
- Class: Cephalopoda
- Order: †Orthocerida
- Family: †Orthoceratidae
- Genus: †Eotripteroceras; Flower, 1943

Extinct genus of nautiloids

Eotripteroceras is a smooth-shelled orthocerid from the middle Ordovician of the state of New York.

The shell of Eotripteroceras is a depressed orthocone with the underside (the venter) flatter than the upper (the dorsum). The siphuncle is below the center -as viewed in horizontal orientation- and is cylindrical in form. Both siphuncle and chambers are empty.
