= Jangziceras =

Jangziceras Temporal range: Middle Silurian

Scientific classification
- Kingdom: Animalia
- Phylum: Mollusca
- Class: Cephalopoda
- Order: †Orthocerida
- Genus: †Jangziceras

Genus of molluscs

Jangziceras is a genus of fossil nautiloid cephalopods from the Middle Silurian of southern China belonging to the Orthocerida incertae sedis, its familial association undetermined. The type is Jangziceras sichuanense Lai Chai-Geen . Its description falls within the characters of the Orthocerida.

Jangziceras sichuanense was found in the Middle Silurian (Telychian) Lojoping Formation in Sichuan and Guizhou Provinces associated with orthoderids such as Sichuanaceras and Neosichuanoceras and oncocerids such as Oocerina and Guangyuanoceras among other nautiloid genera in reefal environments
