= Eburoceras =

Eburoceras Temporal range: Late Cambrian, Trempealeauan

Scientific classification
- Kingdom: Animalia
- Phylum: Mollusca
- Class: Cephalopoda
- Subclass: Nautiloidea
- Order: †Ellesmerocerida
- Family: †Ellesmeroceratidae
- Genus: †Eburoceras; Chen & Teichert, 1983

Genus of molluscs

Eburoceras is an early nautiloid cephalopod from the Upper Yenchau and Wanwankau, Upper Cambrian Trempealeauan of China, assigned to the Ellesmeroceratidae.

The shell of Eburoceras is long and narrow, curved in a broad arc of near constant curvature, interpreted as endogastric, assuming the small siphuncle on the inner margin to be ventral. Known for sure dorsal siphuncles do not appear until later in the Early Ordovician with the Trocholitidae, which if so would make it (Eburoceras) exogastric. Eburoceras is the most strongly curved of the Cambrian ellesmeroceratids.

Eburoceras is the earliest ellesmeroceratid except for the short lived Hunyuanocers, from the lower part of the Upper Yenchou, that proceeded it. Eburoceras died out at the end of Wanwankau time, along with the other Late Cambrian ellesmeroceratid genera, except for Ectenolites and Clarkoceras, which persisted into the Ordovician.

Late Cambrian Tanycamerocers (Ellesmeroceratidae) is similar in being long and narrow and having a small marginal siphuncle, but is straight. Late Cambrian Huaiheceras (Hauiheceratidae) is also similar in being long with a small marginal siphuncle, but is exogastric and less strongly curved.
