= Mongoceras =

Mongoceras Temporal range: 443.7–428.2 Ma

Scientific classification
- Kingdom: Animalia
- Phylum: Mollusca
- Class: Cephalopoda
- Order: †Orthocerida
- Superfamily: †Orthocerataceae
- Genus: †Mongoceras

Extinct genus of nautiloids

Mongoceras is an extinct orthoconic nautiloid cephalopod found in the Silurian of China and Siberia. It is included in the Orthocerida. The family in undetermined.

== Morphology ==
As with the Orthocerida the shell of Mongoceras is generally long and straight, with a generally central siphuncle composed of thin connecting rings. A vertical, heads down orientation in life can be inferred, in contrast with the horizontal benthic orientation of ellesmerocerida, endocerids, and many actinocerids with their weighted ventral siphuncles.

== Association ==
Mongoceras has been found with Kionoceras, Geisonocers, and Sichuanoceras in Silurian reefoid formations in China, along with a suite of other benthic invertebrates. It has also been found in core samples from Siberia with Edenoceras hiliferum and Geisonoceras kureikense.
