= Zittelloceras =

Zittelloceras Temporal range: M-U Ordovician

Scientific classification
- Kingdom: Animalia
- Phylum: Mollusca
- Class: Cephalopoda
- Subclass: Nautiloidea
- Order: †Oncocerida
- Family: †Oncoceratidae
- Genus: †Zittelloceras; Hyatt (1884)

Genus of molluscs

Zittelloceras is an extinct genus of nautiloids from the order Oncocerida which are among a large group of once diverse and numerous shelled cephalopods, now represented by only a handful of species.

Zittleoceras, which is included in the family Oncoceratidae, is characterized by subcircular or slightly depressed cyrtoconic shells with ventral, suborthochoanitic empty siphuncles; the shell surface typically with crenulated transverse frills or distinct noncrenulated annulations. Zittleoceras has been found in middle and upper Ordovician sediments in North America and Scotland. (Sweet, 1964)

== See also ==
- Nautiloid
  - List of nautiloids
