= Triboloceras =

Triboloceras Temporal range: Mississippian

Scientific classification
- Kingdom: Animalia
- Phylum: Mollusca
- Class: Cephalopoda
- Subclass: Nautiloidea
- Order: Nautilida
- Family: †Trigonoceratidae
- Genus: †Triboloceras; Kummel 1964

Genus of nautiloids

Triboloceras is the name given to an extinct nautiloid genus from the Lower Carboniferous (Mississippian), included in the nautilid family Trigonoceratidae characterized by an evolute shell bearing longitudinal ribs, with whorls in contact except in the early and very latest growth stages. Chambers are short, sutures tend for form ventral and in some cases dorsal and lateral lobes. The siphuncle is small, tubular, and subcentral. (Kummel 1964)

Triboloceras is a junior synonym for the previously named Vestinautilus and is generally no longer used.
