= Ellinoceras =

Ellinoceras Temporal range: Middle Ordovician

Scientific classification
- Kingdom: Animalia
- Phylum: Mollusca
- Class: Cephalopoda
- Subclass: Nautiloidea
- Order: Nautilida
- Genus: †Ellinoceras; Balashov, 1960

Extinct genus of molluscs

Ellinoceras is a genus of small, straight, annulate actinoceratid from the Middle Ordovician of northeastern Siberia with strongly sinuous sutures and subcentral siphuncle. Sutures have 14 narrow lobes and saddles, the ventral lobe deep and broad with a small median saddle. The siphuncle segments are short and broad with short necks and a wide endosiphuncular tube.

Ellinoceras somewhat only superficially resembles other members of the Actinoceratidae and is distinct mainly by its sinuous sutures.
