= Siberioceras =

Scientific classification
- Kingdom: Animalia
- Phylum: Mollusca
- Class: Cephalopoda
- Order: †Orthocerida
- Genus: †Siberioceras; Zhuravleva, 1957

Extinct genus of molluscs

Siberioceras is an extinct genus of orthocerids of uncertain affinity defined by Zhuravleva (1957). Orthocerids are prehistoric shelled cephalopods included in the mostly orthoconic nautiloid superorder Orthoceratoidea.
