= Balashovia =

Balashovia Temporal range: Eifelian

Scientific classification
- Kingdom: Animalia
- Phylum: Mollusca
- Class: Cephalopoda
- Subclass: Nautiloidea
- Order: Oncocerida
- Family: Archiacoceratidae
- Genus: Balashovia Zhuravleva, 1974

Genus of molluscs

Balashovia is a genus of oncocerid nautiloids from the Middle Devonian, (lower Eifelian), included in the Archiacoceratidae, a family characterized by compressed, exogastric, cyrtocones with a large, actinosiphonate, dorsal siphuncle.
