= Mahoningoceras =

Mahoningoceras Temporal range: Middle Pennsylvanian

Scientific classification
- Kingdom: Animalia
- Phylum: Mollusca
- Class: Cephalopoda
- Order: Nautilida
- Family: Temnocheilidae
- Genus: Mahoningoceras Murphy, 1974

Genus of molluscs

Mahoningoceras is a genus of nautiloids included in the Nautilida that lived during the late Carboniferous.
