= Donacoceras =

Donacoceras Temporal range: Ordovician

Scientific classification
- Kingdom: Animalia
- Phylum: Mollusca
- Class: Cephalopoda
- Order: †Orthocerida
- Genus: †Donacoceras; Foerste (1925)

Genus of molluscs

Donacoceras is an extinct genus of actively mobile carnivorous cephalopod, essentially a nautiloid that lived in what would be North America during the Ordovician from 460.5—443.7 mya, existing for approximately 16.8 million years.

== Taxonomy ==
Donacoceras was named by Foerste (1925). It was assigned to Orthocerida by Teichert et al. (1964); and to Endocerida by Sepkoski (2002).

== Morphology ==
The shell is usually long, and may be straight ("orthoconic") or gently curved. In life, these animals may have been similar to the modern squid, except for the long shell.

== Fossil distribution ==
Fossil distribution is exclusive to Gaspé Peninsula, Quebec, Canada.
