= Huanghuachangoceras =

Huanghuachangoceras Temporal range: Late Ordovician

Scientific classification
- Kingdom: Animalia
- Phylum: Mollusca
- Class: Cephalopoda
- Subclass: Nautiloidea
- Order: Discosorida
- Genus: Huanghuachangoceras Chen & Zou, 1984

Genus of molluscs

Huanghuachangoceras is a discsorid genus from the Upper Ordovician of China.
