= Tienoceras =

Tienoceras Temporal range: Permian

Scientific classification
- Kingdom: Animalia
- Phylum: Mollusca
- Class: Cephalopoda
- Order: †Orthocerida
- Genus: †Tienoceras; Chao (1954)

Genus of nautiloids

Tienoceras is an orthoceratoid genus from the Permian of China (Hunan). Orthoceratoids are slender conical or near cylindrical, orthoconic, nautiloid cephalopods from the Paleozoic. Nautiloids, which include a number of different extinct orders, were far more diverse and numerous in the past, but are represented today by only two closely related genera.

Teinoceras is represented by a smooth orthocone that enlarges slightly with growth and that has a lenticular (i.e. "lens-shaped") cross section. The middle of the dorsum and venter (top and bottom) are flattened or depressed and the dorsolateral and ventrolateral areas have longitudinal depressions. Sutures, formed where septa join the outer wall, have mid-dorsal, mid-ventral, and sharp lateral lobes separated by narrow ventrolateral and dorsolateral saddles. The siphuncle, which is small, runs through the middle.

The exact relationship of Tienoceras within the orthoceratoids is unknown.
