= Uloceras =

Uloceras Temporal range: Middle Devonian

Scientific classification
- Kingdom: Animalia
- Phylum: Mollusca
- Class: Cephalopoda
- Subclass: Nautiloidea
- Genus: †Uloceras; Zhuravleva, 1974

Genus of molluscs

Uloceras is a genus of early nautiloid named by Zhuravleva in 1974, that lived during the middle Devonian
