= Calhounoceras =

Calhounoceras Temporal range: Early Carb (Tour)

Scientific classification
- Kingdom: Animalia
- Phylum: Mollusca
- Class: Cephalopoda
- Subclass: Nautiloidea
- Order: †Actinocerida
- Genus: †Calhounoceras; Troedsson, 1926

Extinct genus of molluscs

Calhounoceras is a genus of actinocerids (Cephalopoda, Nautiloidea) from the Lower Mississippian named by Troedsson, 1926.
