= Sceptrites =

Sceptrites Temporal range: M Devonian

Scientific classification
- Kingdom: Animalia
- Phylum: Mollusca
- Class: Cephalopoda
- Order: †Pseudorthocerida
- Family: †Spyroceratidae
- Genus: †Sceptrites; Flower, 1939

Genus of nautiloids

Sceptrites is an orthoceratoid genus contained within the pseudorthocerid family Spyroceratidae known by its slightly compressed, possibly endogastrically curved, cyrtoconic shell. Sceptrites has been found in Devonian sediments in Ohio and N.Y. in the United States and in Victoria, Australia.

The Sceptrites shell is moderately narrow and expands slightly with an even, gentle curvature. Early sutures of straight transverse, later ones have slight lateral lobes. The siphuncle is subcentral. Mural cameral deposits are deposited along the concave side of the shell—reason to assume its endogastric nature.
