= Krykyloceras =

Krykyloceras Temporal range: early Middle Devonian

Scientific classification
- Kingdom: Animalia
- Phylum: Mollusca
- Class: Cephalopoda
- Subclass: Nautiloidea
- Order: Nautilida
- Genus: †Krykyloceras

Genus of molluscs

Krykyloceras is a genus of early nautilids that lived during the Middle Devonian, a member of the same order that includes the recent Nautilus.
