= Polygrammoceras =

Polygrammoceras Temporal range: M Ord - L Dev

Scientific classification
- Kingdom: Animalia
- Phylum: Mollusca
- Class: Cephalopoda
- Order: †Orthocerida
- Family: †Orthoceratidae
- Genus: †Polygrammoceras; Foeste, 1928

Extinct genus of nautiloids

Polygrammoceras is an orthoconic nautiloid that lived during the period from the middle Ordovician to the early Devonian in what is now North America and Eurasia.

The Polygrammoceras shell bears longitudinal ribs or striae separated by narrow grooves or flat shallow inner areas. As common for orthocerids sutures are straight and transverse. The siphuncle is between the center and the venter, and is empty of organic deposits with segments expanded into the chambers.
