= Jaregoceras =

Jaregoceras Temporal range: Frasnian

Scientific classification
- Kingdom: Animalia
- Phylum: Mollusca
- Class: Cephalopoda
- Subclass: Nautiloidea
- Order: †Discosorida
- Family: †Discosoridae
- Genus: †Jaregoceras; Zhuravleva, 1972

Extinct genus of molluscs

Jaregoceras is a genus of nautiloids from the Upper Devonian discosorid that probably belongs to the family Discosoridae.
