= Vasalemmoceras =

Vasalemmoceras Temporal range: Caradocian

Scientific classification
- Kingdom: Animalia
- Phylum: Mollusca
- Class: Cephalopoda
- Subclass: Nautiloidea
- Order: †Tarphycerida
- Genus: †Vasalemmoceras; Stumbur, 1962

Synonyms
- Charactoceras tolerabile (Stumbur, 1962)

Genus of nautiloid cephalopods

Vasalemmoceras is a genus of nautiloid cephalopods from the upper Caradocian of Estonia, assigned to the Tarphycerida. The type species is Vasalemmoceras tolerabile Stumbur, 1962.
