= Stereotoceras =

Stereotoceras Temporal range: M-U Devonian

Scientific classification
- Kingdom: Animalia
- Phylum: Mollusca
- Class: Cephalopoda
- Subclass: Nautiloidea
- Order: †Oncocerida
- Family: †Brevicoceratidae
- Genus: †Stereotoceras; Flower, 1950

Stereotoceras is a Middle and Upper Devonian genus in the oncocerid family Brevicoceratidae that formed a smooth, depressed, gyroconic shell with the dorsum much flatter that the venter. Sutures are straight ventrally but have dorsal lobes. Growth lines outline a ventral hyponomic sinus but are otherwise transverse. The siphuncle in ventral, nummuloidal, with discrete, irregular, actinosiphonate deposits at the septal foramina.
