= Paradnatoceras =

Paradnatoceras Temporal range: Ordovician

Scientific classification
- Kingdom: Animalia
- Phylum: Mollusca
- Class: Cephalopoda
- Order: †Orthocerida
- Genus: †Paradnatoceras

Genus of molluscs

Paradnatoceras is an extinct straight-shelled cephalopod genus that lived in what would become China during the Ordovician from 478.6 to about 461 mya, existing for approximately 17.6 Ma.

== Taxonomy ==
Paradnatoceras is included in the Orthocerida according to Sepkoski (2002). Inclusion of the Orthocerida in the subclass Orthoceratoidea is according to more recent taxonomic opinion. In older taxonomies, e.g., the Orthocerida were included in the Nautiloidea.

== Morphology ==
The shell is usually long, and may be straight ("orthoconic") or gently curved. In life, these animals may have been similar to the modern squid, except for the long shell.

== Fossil distribution ==
Fossil distribution is exclusive to central and southern China.
