= Pancornus =

Pancornus Temporal range: Late Devonian

Scientific classification
- Kingdom: Animalia
- Phylum: Mollusca
- Class: Cephalopoda
- Subclass: Nautiloidea
- Order: †Discosorida
- Genus: †Pancornus; Zhuravleva, 1972

Pancornus is an extinct genus from the nautiloid order Discosorida that lived during the Late Devonian. Pancornus was named by F.A. Zhuravleva in 1972, and is contemporary with other late discosorids such as Parevlanoceras and Raphanites.
