= Bogoslovskya =

Bogoslovskya Temporal range: Devonian-?Permian

Scientific classification
- Kingdom: Animalia
- Phylum: Mollusca
- Class: Cephalopoda
- Subclass: Nautiloidea
- Order: Palliocerida
- Family: Bogoslovskyidae
- Genus: Bogoslovskya Zhuravleva, 1978

Species
- B. miharanoroensis; B. omiensis

Genus of molluscs

Bogoslovskya is an extinct orthoceroid cephalopod genus that lived in what is now Asia (Urals and Japan) from the Devonian to the Permian.

== Taxonomy ==
Bogoslovskya was named by Zhuravleva (1978) which at that time included 5 species from the Devonian of the Ural Mountains. Since then three more species have been described from the Carboniferous and Permian of Japan. Bogoslovskya was originally assigned to the subfamily Michelinoceratinae within the Orthocerida, wherein it was listed by Sepkoski (2002) and reassigned to the Palliocerida by Zhuravleva (2005) and placed in the newly established Bogoslovskyidae.

== Morphology ==
Bogoslovskya has an orthoconic shell with an empty eccentric siphuncle of which there are only very thin and narrow septal necks that are thickened at the edge but with no evidence of connecting rings. Species from the Devonian of the Urals have smooth shells; later forms from Japan possess transverse ornamentation in the form of lirae or thin riblets.
