= Smileoceras =

Scientific classification
- Kingdom: Animalia
- Phylum: Mollusca
- Class: Cephalopoda
- Subclass: Nautiloidea
- Order: †Discosorida
- Genus: †Smileoceras; Zhuravleva, 1972

Genus of molluscs

Smileoceras is an extinct genus of prehistoric nautiloids named by Zhurableva in 1972, included in the Discosorida.
