= Ecdyceras =

Ecdyceras Temporal range: Middle -?Late Ordovician

Scientific classification
- Missing taxonomy template (fix): Ecdyceras

Extinct genus of molluscs

Ecdyceras is a genus in the Ascocerida doubtfully assigned to the Hebetoceratidae. It somewhat resembles Hebetoceras.
