= Antigyroceras =

Antigyroceras Temporal range: Late Silurian - Early Devonian

Scientific classification
- Kingdom: Animalia
- Phylum: Mollusca
- Class: Cephalopoda
- Subclass: Nautiloidea
- Order: Nautilida
- Genus: †Antigyroceras; Barskov, 1972

Extinct genus of molluscs

Antigyroceras is a genus of nautiloids in the order Discosorida, known from central Asia, that lived during Late Silurian and Early Devonian times. It is contemporary with the discosorid Endoplectoceras.
