= Ukhtoceras =

Ukhtoceras Temporal range: Devonian

Scientific classification
- Kingdom: Animalia
- Phylum: Mollusca
- Class: Cephalopoda
- Subclass: Nautiloidea
- Order: †Discosorida
- Genus: †Ukhtoceras; Zhuravleva, 1972

Extinct genus of molluscs

Ukhtoceras is a genus of cephalopods included in the nautiloid order Discosorida that lived during the Devonian. Its range was thought at first to be limited to the Frasnian (Late Devonian). With discovery of Ukhtoceras hidense from a Lower Devonian shale in Japan the stratigraphic range was thus lowered as well as its geographic range extended. The type is Ukhtoceras asser (Nalivkin 1930). This genus is sometimes put in the Ukhtoceratidae.
