= Parakionoceras =

Parakionoceras Temporal range: M Silurian - Devonian

Scientific classification
- Kingdom: Animalia
- Phylum: Mollusca
- Class: Cephalopoda
- Order: †Orthocerida
- Family: †Kionoceratidae
- Genus: †Parakionoceras; Foeste, 1928

Extinct genus of nautiloids

Parakionoceras is an extinct nautiloid that lived during the Silurian and Devonian in what is now Europe; included in the orthoceratoid family Kionoceratidae in the Treatise part K, 1964 but removed to the Arionoceratidae in Kröger 2008.

Parakionoceras has a long, faintly curved, exogastric shell with relatively long camerae and straight transverse sutures. The surface is lined with sharp-edged longitudinal ribs separated by broader concave inner areas. The siphuncle is slightly eccentric; necks short and loxochoantitic, directed slightly inward; connecting rings slightly inflated. Cameral deposits well developed.
