= Spanioceras =

Scientific classification
- Kingdom: Animalia
- Phylum: Mollusca
- Class: Cephalopoda
- Subclass: Nautiloidea
- Order: †Oncocerida
- Genus: †Spanioceras

Extinct genus of molluscs

Spanioceras is an extinct genus of nautiloid cephalopods belonging to the order Oncocerida, which is thought to have given rise to the Nautilida which includes the living Nautilus.
