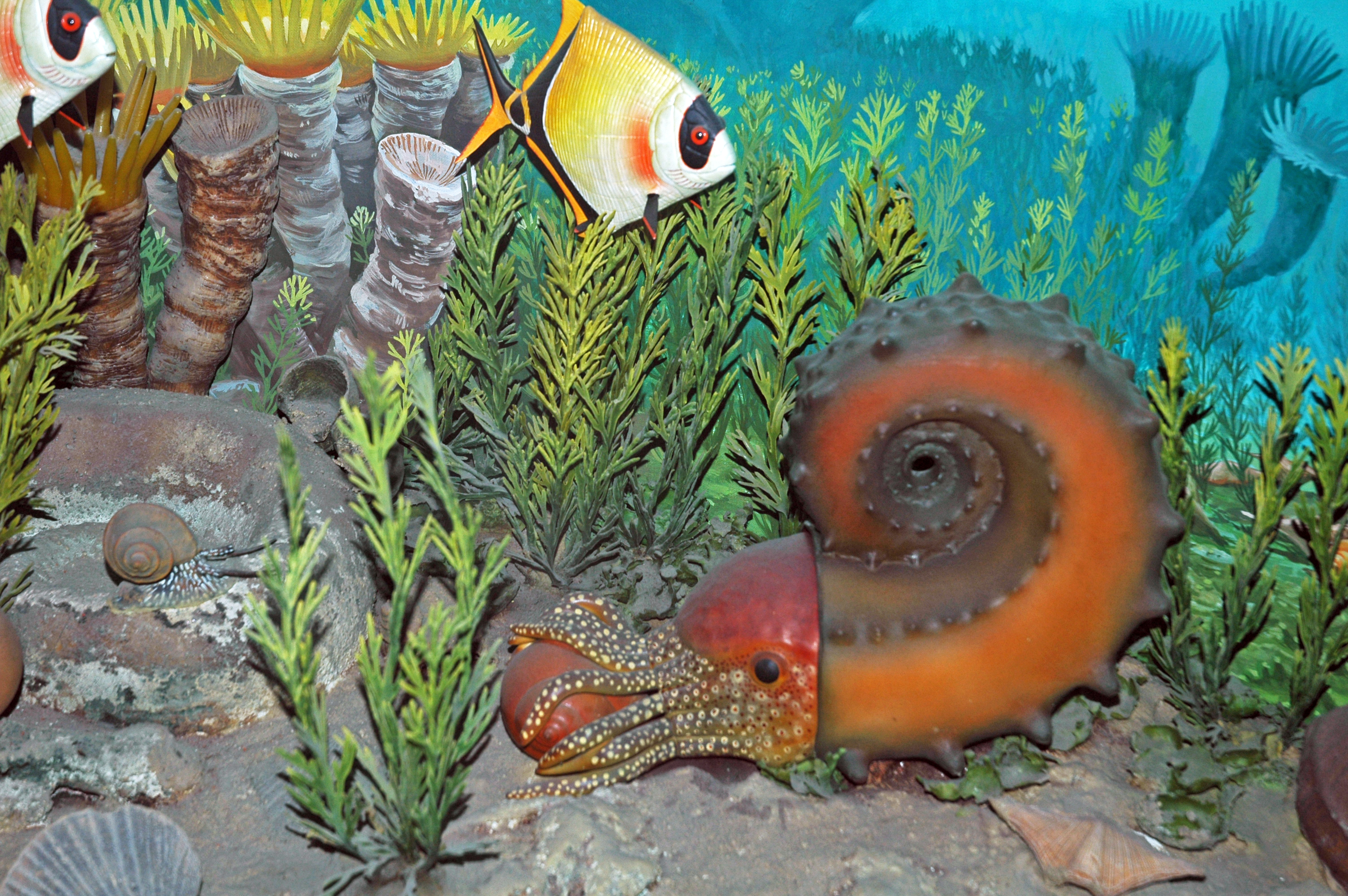
- Tainoceras reconstruction at Carnegie Museum of Natural History

Scientific classification
- Domain: Eukaryota
- Kingdom: Animalia
- Phylum: Mollusca
- Class: Cephalopoda
- Subclass: Nautiloidea
- Order: Nautilida
- Family: †Tainoceratidae
- Genus: †Tainoceras; Hyatt, 1883

= Tainoceras =

Tainoceras Temporal range: Pennsylvanian- Triassic

Extinct genus of nautiloids

Tainoceras is an extinct coiled cephalopod that live during the later part of the Paleozoic and Triassic, that belongs to the nautiloid family Tainoceratidae.

Tainoceras has an evolude shell with a subquadrate whorl section that bears a double row of nodes on either side of its broad outer rim (venter). Metacoceras is similar except for lacking the double rows of nodes. Tainionautilus is similar, except that instead of nodes it has thick slanting lateral ribs
