= Barnesoceras =

Barnesoceras Temporal range: Early Ordovician

Scientific classification
- Kingdom: Animalia
- Phylum: Mollusca
- Class: Cephalopoda
- Subclass: Nautiloidea
- Order: †Ellesmerocerida
- Family: †Ellesmeroceratidae
- Genus: †Barnesoceras; Flower, 1964

Extinct genus of molluscs

Barnesoceras is a genus of moderately large, Lower Ordovician ellesmoerceratids with a simple, but strongly cyrtoconic shell that expands in the vertical dimension more rapidly than in the horizontal, resulting in its being laterally compressed. The aperture is simple, unconstricted, and straight sided from in front. Growth lines show a broad crest on either side that swings forward above the ventral hyponomic sinus. Septa are close spaced and have a shallow curvature. The body, or living, chamber takes up much of the shell. The siphuncle is ventral, close to the longitudinally concave side.

All eight species named and described, including the type, Barnsoceras clavum Flower, 1964, were found in the Threadgill Limestone of the Lower Ordovician Tanyard Formation in Texas.
