= Bitaunioceras =

Bitaunioceras Temporal range: Permian

Scientific classification
- Kingdom: Animalia
- Phylum: Mollusca
- Class: Cephalopoda
- Order: †Orthocerida
- Family: †Orthoceratidae
- Genus: †Bitaunioceras; Shimizy & Obata, 1936

Genus of molluscs (fossil)

Bitaunioceras is a genus of Permian orthocerids with a gradually expanding, straight, orthodontic shell with straight transverse sutures and a small, subcentral siphuncle with straight tubular orthochromatic necks.

The shell surface of Bitaunioceras has a few, shallow, rounded constrictions and numerous, unequal, prominent transverse wire-like lirae.

Bitaunioceras species have been found in Texas in the United States, Coahuila in Mexico, Sicily, Timor, and the south Urals in Russia.
