= Pleurorthoceras =

Pleurorthoceras Temporal range: U Ordovician

Scientific classification
- Kingdom: Animalia
- Phylum: Mollusca
- Class: Cephalopoda
- Order: †Orthocerida
- Family: †Orthoceratidae
- Genus: †Pleurorthoceras; Flower, 1962

Extinct genus of nautiloids

Pleurorthoceras, from Ancient Greek πλευρά (pleurá), meaning "rib or side", ὀρθός (orthós), meaning "straight", and κέρας (kéras), meaning "horn", is an orthocerid cephalopod from the Upper Ordovician of North America (Ohio, Manit). The shell externally is like that of Michelinoceras in being long and slender with a circular cross section. It differs in having a subcentral siphuncle with somewhat inflated segments.
