= Kitatites =

Kitatites Temporal range: early Late Devonian

Scientific classification
- Kingdom: Animalia
- Phylum: Mollusca
- Class: Cephalopoda
- Subclass: Nautiloidea
- Order: †Discosorida
- Genus: †Kitatites; Zhuravleva, 1972

Extinct genus of molluscs

Kitatites is an extinct genus of Upper Devonian (Frasnian) cephalopods named by Zhuravleva, 1972. It is assigned to the nautiloid order Discosorida.
