= Mericoceras =

Mericoceras Temporal range: Silurian(?) -Devonian

Scientific classification
- Kingdom: Animalia
- Phylum: Mollusca
- Class: Cephalopoda
- Order: †Orthocerida
- Genus: †Mericoceras

Extinct genus of nautiloids

Mericoceras is an extinct nautiloid cephalopod that lived during the Late Devonian and possible as early as the Silurian.

== Taxonomy ==
Mericoceras is included in the Orthocerida, an order of cephalopods.

== Fossil distribution ==
Fossil distribution is exclusive to Sardinia, Wisconsin USA, and northern Ontario, Canada.
