= Joldagiroceras =

Joldagiroceras Temporal range: Late Silurian

Scientific classification
- Kingdom: Animalia
- Phylum: Mollusca
- Class: Cephalopoda
- Order: †Orthocerida
- Genus: †Joldagiroceras

Extinct genus of orthocerids

Joldagiroceras is a genus of orthocerids that lived during the Late Silurian, Ludlovian stage. Othoderids are nautiloid cephalopods characterized generally by long straight shells with narrow central siphuncles.
