= Ruthenoceras =

Scientific classification
- Domain: Eukaryota
- Kingdom: Animalia
- Phylum: incertae sedis
- Genus: †Ruthenoceras

Genus of fossil molluscs

Ruthenoceras is a conical Cambrian fossil originally classified as a cephalopod, but which is too poorly preserved for a classification to be upheld.
