= Manjoceras =

Manjoceras Temporal range: Early Paleozoic

Scientific classification
- Kingdom: Animalia
- Phylum: Mollusca
- Class: Cephalopoda
- Subclass: Nautiloidea
- Order: †Discosorida
- Genus: †Manjoceras; Zhuravleva, 1972

Genus of molluscs

Manjoceras is a genus of discosorids named by Zhuravleva, 1972; a kind of nautiloid in which the connecting rings of the siphuncle are longitudinally zoned and clasp around the rim of the septal openings.
