= Radoceras =

Scientific classification
- Kingdom: Animalia
- Phylum: Mollusca
- Class: Cephalopoda
- Subclass: Nautiloidea
- Order: †Discosorida
- Genus: †Radoceras

Radoceras is an extinct genus of prehistoric nautiloids from the Paleozoic included in the order Discosorida
