= Kobyashiceras =

Kobyashiceras Temporal range: Early Devonian (Lochkovian)

Scientific classification
- Kingdom: Animalia
- Phylum: Mollusca
- Class: Cephalopoda
- Subclass: Nautiloidea
- Order: Actinocerida
- Family: uncertain
- Genus: Kobyashiceras Niko, 1998

Extinct genus of molluscs

Kobyashiceras is an extinct genus in the cephalopod order Actinocerida, from Lower Devonian marine sediments in Japan. The type and sole included species is Kobayashiceras gifuense. The generic name honors the late Dr. Teiichi Kobayashi who contributed greatly to the study of Paleozoic cephalopods. The specific name is derived from Gifu, the name of the prefecture in which the type locality is found.

Kobyashiceras is represented by large orthoconic shells with a circular cross section and an overall gradual rate of expansion that varies from near zero to 2.5 degrees. Surface ornamentation consists of weakly sinuate transverse lirae. Sutures are straight, transverse to slightly oblique. In the largest specimen the body chamber reaches a diameter of approximately 52 mm. The initial chamber (camera ) is large, broadly conical in shape, with bluntly pointed apex. The caecum is very large, covering most of the initial chamber. Septal curvature is relatively shallow. The siphuncle is centrally located, takes up most of the initial chamber and adheres to the apex. Siphuncle segments are strongly inflated adapically, being globular to subglobular in form, and decrease in inflation toward the aperture with the more adoral segments being fusiform to subcylindrical. Apical septal necks are cyrtochoanitic to suborthochoanitic, those that are more adoral are short suborthochoanitic.

Endosiphuncular deposits well developed, fusing to form a thick lining on the ventral siphuncular wall. The endosiphuncular canal system consists of a central canal that is dorsally displaced, from which extend nearly straight, narrow, branching canals, (recognized only in apical camerae) that connect to the ventral siphuncular wall from near the middle of the segments. Cameral deposits are predominantly episeptal-mural, formed on the forward side of the septa and shell wall, with additional hyposeptal deposits on the backsides of the septa.

Kobayashiceras gifuense is assigned to the order Actinocerida on the basis of the apical shell morphology, which it shares with other actinocerids. The genus is based on the forward, or adoral, part of the phragmocone with its proportionally narrow siphuncle that is less common for actinocerids.
