= Bambusoceras =

Bambusoceras Temporal range: Late Cambrian

Scientific classification
- Kingdom: Animalia
- Phylum: Mollusca
- Class: Cephalopoda
- Subclass: Nautiloidea
- Order: †Ellesmerocerida
- Family: †Ellesmeroceratidae
- Genus: †Bambusoceras

Genus of molluscs

Bambusoceras is a genus of Late/Upper Cambrian nautiloids, member of the Ellesmerocerida and probably Ellesmeroceratidae according to Jack Sepkoski's list of cephalopod genera.
