= Kallholnoceras =

Kallholnoceras Temporal range: Ordovician

Scientific classification
- Kingdom: Animalia
- Phylum: Mollusca
- Class: Cephalopoda
- Subclass: Nautiloidea
- Order: †Oncocerida
- Genus: †Kallholnoceras; Frye, 1987

Extinct genus of molluscs

Kallholnoceras is a genus of early oncocerid nautiloids from the Ordovician of Sweden, known only from the Boda Limestone at Kallholn.
