= Chicagooceras =

Chicagooceras Temporal range: Silurian

Scientific classification
- Kingdom: Animalia
- Phylum: Mollusca
- Class: Cephalopoda
- Order: †Orthocerida
- Genus: †Chicagooceras; Foerste and Savage 1927

Genus of molluscs

Chicagooceras is a genus of orthocerids from the Silurian of North America.

Shells are short, breviconic, and faintly curved. Sutures are fairly wide spaced and though straight, slope slightly, dorso-ventrally, to the rear. Siphuncle: small, slightly ventral of the center, thought to be orthochoanitic (straight septal necks) and cylindrical (tubular connecting rings).
