= Magdoceras =

Magdoceras Temporal range: Late Silurian

Scientific classification
- Kingdom: Animalia
- Phylum: Mollusca
- Class: Cephalopoda
- Subclass: Nautiloidea
- Order: †Tarphycerida
- Genus: †Magdoceras

Genus of molluscs

Magdoceras is a genus of Late/Upper Silurian tarphycerids, a kind of nautiloid cephalopod with a coiled shell.
