= Kladisoceras =

Kladisoceras Temporal range: Early Devonian

Scientific classification
- Kingdom: Animalia
- Phylum: Mollusca
- Class: Cephalopoda
- Subclass: Nautiloidea
- Order: †Discosorida
- Genus: †Kladisoceras

Extinct genus of molluscs

Kladisoceras is a genus of Early Devonian fossil cephalopods included in the nautiloid order Discosorida.
