= Selenoceras =

Scientific classification
- Kingdom: Animalia
- Phylum: Mollusca
- Class: Cephalopoda
- Subclass: Nautiloidea
- Order: †Discosorida
- Genus: †Selenoceras; Zhuravleva, 1972

Selenoceras is an extinct genus of nautiloids, named by Zhuravleva in 1972, assigned to the Discosorida. Discosorids constitute an order of shelled cephalopods with siphuncle segments that are zoned longitudinally and connecting rings that typically wrap around the septal necks, re-enforcing the septal perforations. Discosorids ranged from the Middle Ordovician possibly to the Upper Devonian.
