= Angaroceras =

Scientific classification
- Kingdom: Animalia
- Phylum: incertae sedis
- Genus: †Angaroceras

Cambrian fossil

Angaroceras is a conical Cambrian fossil originally classified as a cephalopod, but which is too poorly preserved for a classification to be upheld.
