= Shantungendoceras =

Shantungendoceras Temporal range: Late Cambrian (Trempealeauan)

Scientific classification
- Kingdom: Animalia
- Phylum: Mollusca
- Class: Cephalopoda
- Subclass: Nautiloidea
- Superorder: †Plectronoceratoidea
- Genus: †Shantungendoceras; Sun, 1937

Genus of molluscs

Shangtungendoceras is a conical plectronoceratoid cephalopod from the Upper Cambrian of north-eastern China, described by Sun (1937) as a primitive endoceroid. Because of its apparently poor preservation its ordinal and familial position is uncertain. It could be included in either the Plectronocerida, family Plectronoceratidae, or the Ellesmerocerida, family Ellesmeroceratidae (Flower, 1954). On the other hand, Teichert (1964) included Shungtangendoceras in the Ellesmoerocatidae.

Shungtangendoceras has a small, marginal siphuncle, presumed ventral (Flower, 1954). the central siphuncle in Sun's analysis turns out to be an adventitious feature. Also, according to Flower (1954) there are no endocones in this fossil, eliminating it from the Endocerida. Moreover, the earliest endocerids have been shown to be derived from the Ellesmerocertidae in the Early Ordovician.

Shungtangendoceras comes from the Wanwankou Member of the Fengshan Formation which is now recognized as late Upper Cambrian in age (Chen and Teichert, 1983; Teichert, 1988; Landing and Kroger, 2009) rather than Lower Ordovician as thought by Flower (1954) and Teichert (1964).

Chen and Techert (1983) do not list Shungtangendoceras among the Cambrian cephalopods, which brings up the question of its possible synonymy.
