= Kentlandoceras =

Kentlandoceras Temporal range: Middle Ordovician

Scientific classification
- Kingdom: Animalia
- Phylum: Mollusca
- Class: Cephalopoda
- Subclass: Nautiloidea
- Order: †Oncocerida
- Family: †Oncoceratidae
- Genus: †Kentlandoceras; Foerste, 1932

Genus of molluscs

Kentlandoceras is a genus of middle Ordovician Oncocerids (family Oncoceratidae). Its shell is curved exogastrically, such that the ventral margin is longitudinally convex, but less so than in Loganoceras, and with a submarginal ventral siphuncle instead. The siphuncle in Loganoceras is subcentral. The related Romingoceras is more curved, also with a ventral siphuncle.

All three genera are from the Middle Ordovician of North America.
