= Trispectes =

Scientific classification
- Kingdom: Animalia
- Phylum: Mollusca
- Class: Cephalopoda
- Order: †Orthocerida
- Genus: †Trispectes

Genus of molluscs

Trispectes is an extinct genus of prehistoric nautiloids belonging to the Orthocerida, a variety of mostly straight-shelled cephalopods.
