= Lyecoceras =

Lyecoceras Temporal range: Middle Silurian

Scientific classification
- Kingdom: Animalia
- Phylum: Mollusca
- Class: Cephalopoda
- Order: †Orthocerida
- Family: †Paraphragmitidae
- Genus: †Lyecoceras; Mutvei, 1957

Genus of molluscs

Lyecoceras is a gender of slender endogastrically curved orthocerids, so determined by identification of the hyponomic sinus on the concave side. The siphuncle is dorsal of the center, toward the convex side of the shell. The surface has faint longitudinal striae and is encircled by weak annulations.

Lyecoceras was first found in the Middle Silurian of Sweden, and since in the Silurian of Sochuan Provence, China.
