= Murchisoniceras =

Murchisoniceras Temporal range: Silurian

Scientific classification
- Kingdom: Animalia
- Phylum: Mollusca
- Class: Cephalopoda
- Order: †Orthocerida
- Genus: †Murchisoniceras; Babin, 1966

Species
- see text

Extinct genus of nautiloids

Murchisoniceras is an extinct genus of cephalopod Nautiloid, that lived during the Silurian from 425 to 416 mya, in what would be Europe, existing for approximately 9 million years.

== Taxonomy ==
Murchisoniceras was named by Babin in 1966 and is commonly assigned to the Orthocerida; sometimes as Insertae sedis

Ivan Kolebaba, 2002, included Murchisoniceras in the Palliocerida, an order of orthoconic nautiloids established by Marek, 1998, for those with incomplete connecting rings and suggestions of cameral mantle, along with other similar genera.

== Morphology ==
The shell of Murchisoniceras is generally long and straight (orthoconic). Chambers have organic deposits of calcite which provide counterbalance. Connecting rings in the siphuncle are incomplete. In life, these animals may have been similar to the modern squid, except for the long shell.

== Fossil distribution ==
Murchisoniceras is known from central Europe, Czech Republic, Bohemia.
