= Tretoceras =

Tretoceras Temporal range: eM Ordovician

Scientific classification
- Kingdom: Animalia
- Phylum: Mollusca
- Class: Cephalopoda
- Order: †Orthocerida
- Genus: †Tretoceras; Salter (1958)

Tretoceras is an extinct genus of cephalopods included in the Orthocerida that lived in what would be Europe during the early Middle Ordovician, fossils of which have been found only in Austria.

== Taxonomy ==
Tretoceras was named by Salter (1958) and assigned to Orthocerida by Sweet (1964) and Sepkoski (2002).

== Morphology ==
Tretoceras is represented by depressed orthocones with closely spaced septa and what has been described and two (2) siphuncles, one a large marginal subcylinctral tube, the other a small tubular structure about halfway between the center and venter. Neither surface nor interior nor real nature of the 2 "siphuncles" are well known.

Foeste (1928) suspected a symbiotic relationship between the cephalopod animal and whatever produced the internal structure. Flower (1952) noted similar internal structures in 4 species of different ages. [ibid ref]. The larger, outer, "siphuncle" may simply be an artifact of preservation.
