= Protobactrites =

Protobactrites Temporal range: Ordovician - Silurian 466–421.3 Ma

Scientific classification
- Kingdom: Animalia
- Phylum: Mollusca
- Class: Cephalopoda
- Order: †Orthocerida
- Genus: †Protobactrites; Hyatt in Zittel, 1900

Extinct genus of nautiloids

Protobactrites is an extinct genus of nautiloid cephalopod belonging to the Orthoceratoidea that lived in what would be Europe and Asia during the Ordovician and Silurian from around 466–421.3 million years ago.

== Taxonomy ==
Protobactrites, named by Hyatt in Zittel (1900), is an orthocerid genus of unknown familial affiliation, a taxonomic placement retained by Sepkoski (2002). Despite its name, Protobactrites has no known relationship to the Bactritida.

== Morphology ==
Protobactrites is characterized by a long slender orthoconic or faintly curved longiconic shell with a circular or subcircular cross section, transverse sutures, long body chamber and oblique aperture. The siphuncle is eccentric; exact structure unknown. The surface has transverse and in some species longitudinal striae. Adult shells may be naturally truncated.

Nothing is known of the living animal which may have had eight or 10 arms, and tentacles, like modern coleoids such as modern squid and octopus.

== Fossil distribution ==
Fossil distribution is exclusive to Europe and eastern Asia.
