= Cryptocycloceras =

Cryptocycloceras Temporal range: Silurian

Scientific classification
- Kingdom: Animalia
- Phylum: Mollusca
- Class: Cephalopoda
- Order: †Orthocerida
- Genus: †Cryptocycloceras

Genus of molluscs

Cryptocycloceras is an extinct genus of actively mobile carnivorous cephalopod that lived in what would be Europe during the Silurian from 422.9—418.7 mya, existing for approximately 4.2 million years.

== Taxonomy ==
Cryptocycloceras was assigned to Orthocerida by Sepkoski (2002).

== Morphology ==
The shell is usually long, and may be straight ("orthoconic") or gently curved. In life, these animals may have been similar to the modern squid, except for the long shell.
