= Capricornites =

Capricornites Temporal range: Devonian

Scientific classification
- Domain: Eukaryota
- Kingdom: Animalia
- Phylum: Mollusca
- Class: Cephalopoda
- Subclass: Nautiloidea
- Order: Nautilida
- Family: †Rutoceratidae
- Genus: †Capricornites; Zhuravleva, 1974

Extinct genus of molluscs

Capricornites is a genus of rutoceratids (Nautiloidea - Cephalopoda) from the Devonian, related to such genera as Rutoceras and Goldringia.

In some taxonomies (Manda & Turek, 2009) the Rutoceratidae are included in the Oncocerida rather than in the Nautilida

The name has been mis-spelt as Capriocornites in some tabulations.
