= Arionoceras =

Arionoceras Temporal range: M-USilurian

Scientific classification
- Kingdom: Animalia
- Phylum: Mollusca
- Class: Cephalopoda
- Order: †Orthocerida
- Family: †Arionoceratidae
- Genus: †Arionoceras; Barskov, 1966

Genus of molluscs

Arionoceras is an extinct orthocerid genus from the Middle and Upper Silurian, of Europe that is estimated to have lived from 422.9 to 418.1 mya, existing for approximately 4.8 million years.

== Taxonomy ==
Arionoceras was named by Barskov (1966) and originally assigned to the Michelinoceratidae, but attributed by Serpagli and Gnoli (1977) -ibid to the Geisonoceratidae Zhuravleva (1959) "on the basis of the (admittedly irregular) occurrence of a lining-like endosiphucular deposit." Dzik (1984) assigned Arionoceras to the newly proposed Arionoceratidae as the type genus. Sepkoski (2002) follows previous authors in putting Arionoceras in the Orthoceratida.

== Morphology ==
Arionoceras has a straight or slightly curved shell with a circular or depressed cross section, smooth or transversely sculptured surface, and large apically pointed protoconch. The siphuncle is central with very short suborthochoanitic septal necks and cylindrical connecting rings. Apical chambers in adults have cameral deposits.
