= Trigonoceras =

Trigonoceras Temporal range: Lower Carboniferous

Scientific classification
- Domain: Eukaryota
- Kingdom: Animalia
- Phylum: Mollusca
- Class: Cephalopoda
- Subclass: Nautiloidea
- Order: Nautilida
- Family: †Trigonoceratidae
- Genus: †Trigonoceras; M'Coy,(1844)

Extinct genus of molluscs

Trigonoceras is an extinct genus of prehistoric nautiloids from the nautilid family Trigonoceratidae that lived during the Early Carboniferous in what is now western Europe.

Trigonoceras has a very loosely coiled gyroconic or cyrtoconic shell with a subtriangular cross section, as indicated by fragmentary specimens. The venter on the outer rim or convex side is broad and transversely concave with angular shoulders; the sides which converge on a narrow dorsum are broadly convex. The siphuncle is slightly dorsal of the center and is orthochoanitic.(Kummel,B.1964.) A member of the Trigonoceratidae, Trigonoceras is also a component of the superfamily Trigonocerataceae
