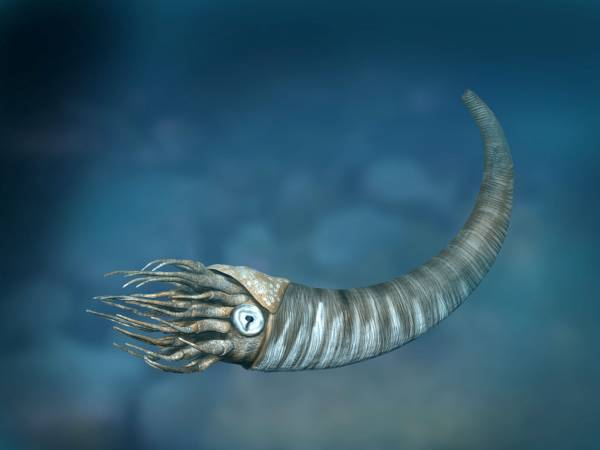
- Digital life restoration of "Cyrtoceras sp"

Scientific classification
- Domain: Eukaryota
- Kingdom: Animalia
- Phylum: Mollusca
- Class: Cephalopoda
- Subclass: Nautiloidea
- Order: †Oncocerida
- Genus: †Cyrtoceras; Conrad, 1838

= Cyrtoceras =

Cyrtoceras Temporal range: Middle Ordovician–Middle Devonian

Extinct genus of nautiloid

Cyrtoceras is an dubious extinct genus of oncoceridan nautiloids that was used for fossils from the middle Ordovician to the middle Devonian, in Africa, Europe, North America and South America.

As for 1964, this genus is no longer considered as valid, as it has not been correctly established.

== Sources ==
- Fossils (Smithsonian Handbooks) by David Ward
- Fossils (A Golden Guide from St. Martin's Press) by Frank H. T. Rhodes, Paul R. Shaffer, Herbert S. Zim, and Raymond Perlman
- Aquagenesis: The Origin and Evolution of Life in the Sea by Richard Ellis
