= Pseudorthocerataceae =

Pseudorthocerataceae Temporal range: Ordovician

Scientific classification
- Kingdom: Animalia
- Phylum: Mollusca
- Class: Cephalopoda
- Order: †Orthocerida
- Superfamily: †Pseudorthocerataceae; Sweet (1964)

Superfamily of molluscs

Pseudorthocerataceae is an extinct superfamily of actively mobile carnivorous cephalopod, essentially a Nautiloid, that lived in what would be North America, Europe, Australia, and Asia during the Ordovician from 490—445.6 mya, existing for approximately 44.4 million years.

== Taxonomy ==
Pseudorthocerataceae was named by Sweet (1964). It was assigned to Pseudorthocerida by Barskov (1968); and to Orthocerida by Sweet (1964), Evans (1994) and Evans (1994).

== Morphology ==
The shell is usually long, and may be straight ("orthoconic") or gently curved. In life, these animals may have been similar to the modern squid, except for the long shell.

== Fossil distribution ==
Fossil distribution is exclusive to Sardinia, Wisconsin USA, and northern Ontario, Canada.
