= Orthocycloceras =

Orthocycloceras Temporal range: Silurian-Devonian

Scientific classification
- Kingdom: Animalia
- Phylum: Mollusca
- Class: Cephalopoda
- Order: †Orthocerida
- Genus: †Orthocycloceras

Orthocycloceras, from Ancient Greek ὀρθός (orthós), meaning "straight", κύκλος (kúklos), meaning "circle", and κέρας (kéras), meaning "horn", is an extinct genus of actively mobile carnivorous cephalopods, essentially a nautiloid, that lived in what would be Europe during the Silurian to Devonian from 428.2 to 412.3 mya, existing for approximately 15.9 million years.

== Taxonomy ==
Orthocycloceras was assigned to Orthocerida Sepkoski (2002).

== Morphology ==
The shell is usually long, and may be straight ("orthoconic") or gently curved. In life, these animals may have been similar to the modern squid, except for the long shell.

== Fossil distribution ==
Fossil distribution is exclusive to Sardinia and Austria.
