= Eusthenoceras =

Eusthenoceras Temporal range: Early Carboniferous

Scientific classification
- Kingdom: Animalia
- Phylum: Mollusca
- Class: Cephalopoda
- Order: †Pseudorthocerida
- Family: †Pseudactinoceratidae
- Genus: †Eusthenoceras; Foord, 1898

Extinct genus of molluscs

Eusthenoceras is a genus of Early Carboniferous nautiloid cephalopods with a large depressed, apically curved shell assigned to the Pseudactinoceratidae, (previously ranked as the subfamily Pseudactinoceratinae). The siphuncle is central or located between the center and venter. Necks are cyrtochoanitic, otherwise siphuncle shape and structure are unknown making inclusion in the Pseuactinoceratidae tentative. Siphuncle segments are probably inflated.

Eusthenoceras is known only from the Lower Carboniferous of Ireland. Related Bergoceras is similar in overall form.
