= Huaiheceras =

Huaiheceras Temporal range: Trempealeauan

Scientific classification
- Kingdom: Animalia
- Phylum: Mollusca
- Class: Cephalopoda
- Subclass: Nautiloidea
- Order: †Ellesmerocerida
- Family: †Huaiheceratidae
- Genus: †Huaiheceras; X.-P. Zou & T.-E. Chen, 1979

Genus of molluscs

Huaiheceras is a genus of ellesmerocerid from China, and type for the Heuhiceratidae that lived during the Late Cambrian. The shell is small, tubular, gently expanding and with a slight curvature. The siphuncle, which is proportionally narrow, is on the outer, concave curvature of the shell, suggesting it is exogastric. Septa are close spaced.

The genus Huaihecerina is similar but has a slightly greater curvature and greater rate of expansion.
