= Neosichuanoceras =

Neosichuanoceras Temporal range: Silurian

Scientific classification
- Domain: Eukaryota
- Kingdom: Animalia
- Phylum: Mollusca
- Class: Cephalopoda
- Order: †Orthocerida
- Family: †incertae sedis
- Genus: †Neosichuanoceras; Chen & Liu, 1974

Extinct genus of nautiloids

Neosichuanoceras is an extinct genus of actively mobile carnivorous cephalopod, essentially a Nautiloid, that lived in what would be Asia during the Silurian from 436.0 to 428.2 mya, existing for approximately 7.8 million years.

== Taxonomy ==
Neosichuanoceras was named by Flower (1958). It was assigned to Endocerida by Teichert et al. (1964); and to Orthocerida by Frey (1981).

== Morphology ==
The shell is usually long, and may be straight ("orthoconic") or gently curved. In life, these animals may have been similar to the modern squid, except for the long shell.

== Fossil distribution ==
Fossil distribution is exclusive to Central China.
