= Trematoceras =

Trematoceras Temporal range: U Triassic

Scientific classification
- Kingdom: Animalia
- Phylum: Mollusca
- Class: Cephalopoda
- Order: †Orthocerida
- Family: †Orthoceratidae
- Genus: †Trematoceras; Eichwald, 1851

Extinct genus of nautiloids

Trematoceras, from Ancient Greek τρῆμα (trêma), meaning "perforation", and κέρας (kéras), meaning "horn", is an orthoconic nautiloid cephalopod from the Upper Triassic of Europe and Asia named by Eichwald in 1851.

== Taxonomy ==
Trematoceras is included in the Michelinoceratinae, a subfamily of the Orthoceratidae

== Morphology ==
Trematoceras has a slender, subcylindrical shell with a bluntly pointed apex, long chambers, straight transverse sutures, and a smooth or faintly cancellated surface. The siphuncle is central, tubular, and empty; septal necks short, orthochoanitic; connecting rings cylindrical or only faintly expanded. Chambers contain prominent lamellar mural and episeptal deposits.

== Distribution ==
Trematoceras has been found in Upper Triassic sediments in Afghanistan, Kazakhstan, and the Russian Federation.
