= Foerste =

Foerste is a surname. Notable people with the surname include:

- August Foerste (1862–1936), American geologist, science teacher, and paleontologist
- Maxime Foerste (born 1991), German actress

== See also ==
- Renata Forste, American sociologist
