= Tainionautilus =

Tainionautilus Temporal range: Permian- LTriassic

Scientific classification
- Domain: Eukaryota
- Kingdom: Animalia
- Phylum: Mollusca
- Class: Cephalopoda
- Subclass: Nautiloidea
- Order: Nautilida
- Family: †Tainoceratidae
- Genus: †Tainionautilus; Mojsisovics, 1902

Extinct genus of nautiloids

Tainonautilus is an extinct coiled cephalopod that lived during the Permian and Early Triassic which is included in the nautiloid family Tainoceratidae.

Tainonautilus has an evolute shell with a subquadrate whorl section. Flanks and outer rim (venter) are flat. The umbilicus is wide and deep; umbilical shoulders have a prominent keel. The sides bear curved retrograde ribs or folds that slant to the rear going from the inner (umbilical) rim to the outer (ventral). The venter, which forms the outer rim has a smooth median sulcus. The siphuncle is subventral, lying near but not on the outer margin.

Tainonautilus has been found in the Alps in Europe and in the Salt Range in Pakistan.
