= Brevicoceras =

Brevicoceras Temporal range: Middle Devonian

Scientific classification
- Domain: Eukaryota
- Kingdom: Animalia
- Phylum: Mollusca
- Class: Cephalopoda
- Subclass: Nautiloidea
- Order: †Oncocerida
- Family: †Brevicoceratidae
- Genus: †Brevicoceras; Flower, 1938

Brevicoceras is an extinct nautiloid genus from the order Oncocerida with wide distribution in the Middle Devonian in Eastern North America, Russia and Morocco. Nautiloids form a broad group of shelled cephalopods that were once diverse and numerous but are now represented by only a handful of species in two genera.

== Taxonomy ==
Brevicoceras was named by Flower in 1938. and is the type genus for the Brevicoceratidae.

== Morphology ==
Brevicoceras produced short, breviconic, shells in which the ventral side of the phragmocone, or chambered part, is longitudinally convex in profile and the opposite dorsal side concave, resulting in their being exograstric - i.e. upwardly curved. The shell reaches its maximum width near the front of the phragmocone or rear of the living chamber. From there it narrows somewhat toward the transverse and slightly contracted aperture In section the shell is slightly broader that high. The dorsal side is also somewhat flattened while the ventral or siphuncular side is more narrowly rounded. Septa are shallow and evenly curved; sutures are with broad shallow dorsal and ventral lobes that diverge to the rear and lateral saddles that diverge forward. The siphuncle located close to the ventral margin is slender with short expanded segments that give it a nummuloidal or beaded appearance, and contains irregular blade-like actinosiphonate deposits. The aperture has a pair a ventro-lateral salients, or projections, and a narrow mid ventral hyponomic sinus confirming the siphuncle is ventral.
