= Rousseau H. Flower =

American paleontologist

Rousseau Hayner Flower (1913–1988) was an extremely prolific 20th century paleontologist, known for his eccentric personality.

== Career ==
Although trained as an entomologist, and a specialist in dragonflies and orthopterans, Flower began studying paleontology in the middle of the 1930s. He became an expert in North American cephalopods of the Devonian period as well as the stratigraphy of the early Paleozoic era. His main field was the nautiloids, which he studied intensely, often focusing on life habits and theoretical aspects of paleobiology, but he also penned many papers on fossil corals and other invertebrates. Flower described several hundred new fossil species and over 100 new genera.

== Eccentricities ==
In the paleontology community, Flower's colorful behavior earned him admirers and enemies—whom he would occasionally "thank" in the acknowledgement sections of his papers or, in one case, in the name of a fossil species. His antics included mocking the alleged low-standards of one organization for paleontologists by dressing as an ape for a conference, and by having his dog inducted into the society. After moving to New Mexico, he took to wearing western-style "cowboy" clothes, and carrying bullwhips and pistols, at one point accidentally shooting a hole through his office ceiling into his boss's office. When people asked about these things, he was known to tell them that he bullwhipped the outcrops he disliked, or that they were for use on his wife. Flower was a skilled cellist, pianist, organist, violinist, and writer of music—all without having taken any lessons. He was also an extreme chain smoker, even taking his habit into the shower.

== Awards ==
- Paleontological Society Medal, 1988
