= Brevicoceratidae =

Brevicoceratidae Temporal range: Ludlow–Devonian

Scientific classification
- Kingdom: Animalia
- Phylum: Mollusca
- Class: Cephalopoda
- Subclass: Nautiloidea
- Order: †Oncocerida
- Family: †Brevicoceratidae; Flower, 1941

Extinct family of molluscs

The Brevicoceratidae is a family of oncocerids that contains genera characterized by exogastric (or rarely endogastric) gyrocones, brevicones, and torticones. that tend to develop vestigial actinosiphonate deposits and subtriangular transverse sections. The Brevicoceratidae are derived from Oonoceras (Oncoceratidae) and range from the mid-Silurian to the Upper Devonian.

Brevicoceratidae is named for the Middle Devonian genus, Brevicoceras, from North America. All told there are some 17 named genera. The family begins with Oxygonioceras in the Middle Silurian, sole recognized representative of that time, and reaches its greatest diversity with 12 genera in the Middle Devonian. The Brevicoceratidae are reduced to four genera in the Upper Devonian, when they become extinct.
