= Acleistoceras =

Acleistoceras Temporal range: middle Devonian

Scientific classification
- Kingdom: Animalia
- Phylum: Mollusca
- Class: Cephalopoda
- Subclass: Nautiloidea
- Order: †Oncocerida
- Family: †Acleistoceratidae
- Genus: †Acleistoceras; Hyatt, 1884

Extinct genus of molluscs

Acleistoceras is a genus of the oncocerid, nautiloid family Acleistoceratidae that lived in the shallow seas that covered much of North America during the Devonian; living from 409—383.7 mya, existing for approximately 25.3 million years.

== Taxonomy ==
Acleistoceras was named by Hyatt (1884) and assigned by Flower (1950) to the newly established Acleistoceratidae which at that time was added to the Oncoceratida. Sepkoski's listing of Acleistoceras in the Oncoceratida simply follows Flower (1950) and Teichert & Moore (1964).

== Morphology ==
Acleistoceras has a straight to slightly curved breviconic shell (i.e. is short) with a circular to slightly depressed cross section. The maximum diameter is in the forward part of the phragmocone; the body chamber tapers slightly to a transverse, subtriangular aperture with a well-developed hyponomic sinus. The dorsal profile is virtually straight, the ventral profile is convex, giving it an overall exogastric form. The siphuncle is subventral, composed of broadly expanded segments which gives it a nummuloidal or beaded appearance.
