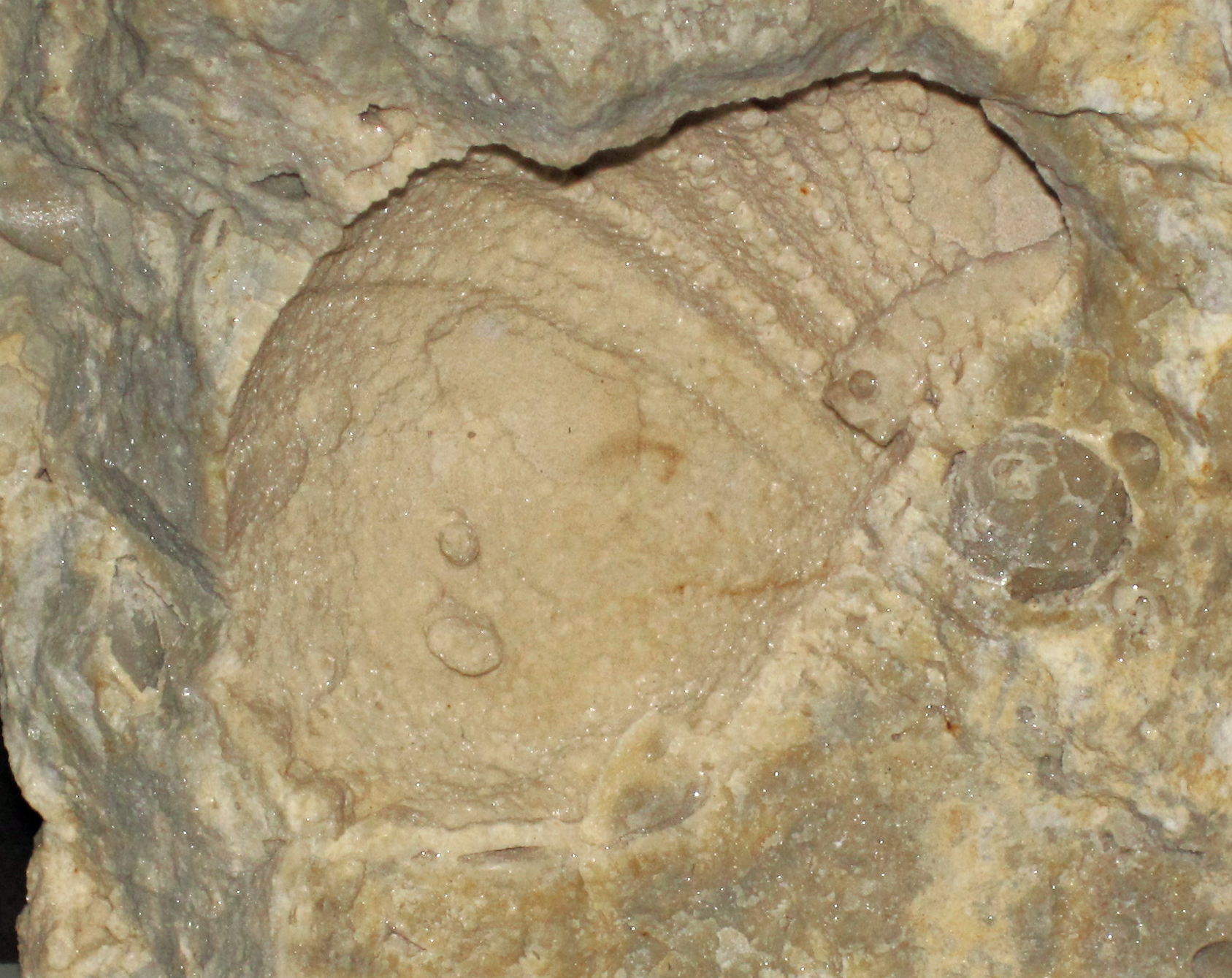
- Amphicyrtoceras pettiti

Scientific classification
- Domain: Eukaryota
- Kingdom: Animalia
- Phylum: Mollusca
- Class: Cephalopoda
- Subclass: Nautiloidea
- Order: †Oncocerida
- Family: †Acleistoceratidae; Flower in Flower & Kümmel 1950

= Acleistoceratidae =

Acleistoceratidae Temporal range: MSilurian- MDevonian

Extinct family of molluscs

The Acleistoceratidae is a family of oncocerids that contains genera characterized by depressed (or rarely compressed) exogastric brevicones and cyrtocones (Sweet, 1964 K398) that range from the Middle Silurian to the Middle Devonian. The siphuncle is broadly expanded, and in some actinosiphonate.

The Acleistoceratidae are derived from Oncoceras (Oncoceratidae) through Amphycertoceras, independently of the Oonoceras stock. The family is named for the genus Acleistoceras. All told some 22 genera have been described.
