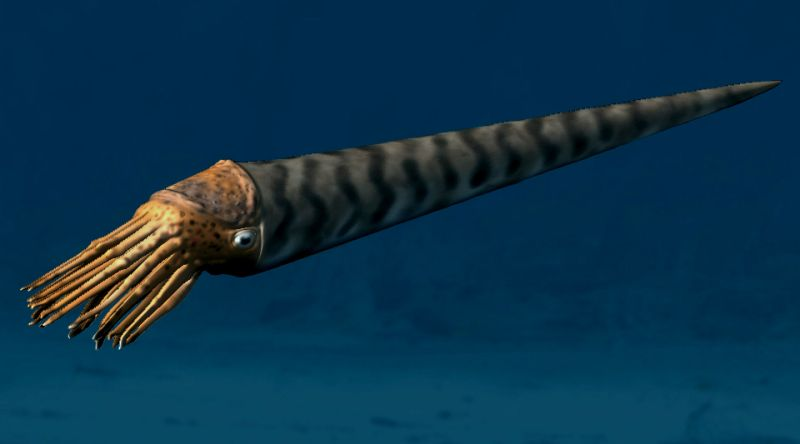
- Orthoceras

Scientific classification
- Kingdom: Animalia
- Phylum: Mollusca
- Class: Cephalopoda
- Order: †Orthocerida
- Family: †Orthoceratidae; McCoy, 1844

Genera
- †Bitaunioceras; †Chebbioceras; †Ctenoceras; †Infundibuloceras; †Kionoceras; †Kopaninoceras; †Merocycloceras; †Michelinoceras; †Ogygoceras; †Orthoceras; †Orthocycloceras; †Oxfordoceras; †Palorthoceras; †Plagiostomoceras; †Pleurorthoceras; †Pojetoceras; †Polygrammoceras; †Pseudospyroceras; †Striatocycloceras; †Theoceras; †Tibichoanoceras; †Trematoceras

Synonyms
- Orthocerotidae

= Orthoceratidae =

Orthoceratidae Temporal range: Ordovician - Permian (possibly Triassic)

Extinct family of molluscs

Orthoceratidae, from Ancient Greek ὀρθός (orthós), meaning "straight", and κέρας (kéras), meaning "horn", is an extinct family of actively mobile carnivorous cephalopods, subclass Nautiloidea, that lived in what would be North America, Europe, Asia, Africa, and Australia from the Ordovician through Triassic from 490—203.7 mya, existing for approximately 286.4 million years.

== Taxonomy ==
Orthoceratidae was named by McCoy (1844) and assigned to the Orthocerida by Teichert and Miller (1939) (as Orthocerotidae), to the Michelinoceratida by Flower (1962), and to the Orthocerataceae by Sweet (1964). It has been subsequently included in the Orthocerataceae by Evans (1994) and in the Orthocerida by Evans (2005) and by Kröger et al. (2007). Flower showed in 1962 that Orthocerotidae as used by Teichert and Miller (1939) is synonymous with Orthoceratidae McCoy (1884).

== Morphology ==
Members are characterised by long, slender, usually orthoconic (straight) but sometimes slightly curved shells, a central or subcentral orthochoanitic siphuncle that is free of deposits, a long body chamber, and cylindrical or only slightly inflated connecting rings. Ornamentation may be in the form of longitudinal or transverse ribs and/or lirae, or the shell surface may be smooth.
