= List of the Paleozoic life of Minnesota =

This list of the Paleozoic life of Minnesota contains the various prehistoric life-forms whose fossilized remains have been reported from within the US state of Minnesota and are between 538.8 and 252.17 million years of age.

== A ==
- †Abludoglyptocrinus –
  - †Abludoglyptocrinus charltoni
- †Acanthocrania
  - †Acanthocrania granulosa
  - †Acanthocrania setigeria
- †Acanthoparypha
  - †Acanthoparypha evetti
- †Actinoceras
  - †Actinoceras beloitense
  - †Actinoceras bigsbyi
  - †Actinoceras gravicentrum
  - †Actinoceras janesvillensis
- †Actinodiscus
- †Aechmina
  - †Aechmina cuspidata
  - †Aechmina ionensis
- †Agelacrinites
- †Alaskadiscus
  - †Alaskadiscus subacutus
- †Allodesma – type locality for genus
  - †Allodesma subellipticum – type locality for species
- †Allumettoceras
  - †Allumettoceras carletonense – or unidentified comparable form
  - †Allumettoceras planodorsatum
- †Ambonychia
  - †Ambonychia tenuis
- †Ambonychiopsis
- †Amecystis
  - †Amecystis woodi
- †Americoncha
  - †Americoncha marginata
- †Amorphognathus
  - †Amorphognathus superbus
- †Amphilichas
  - †Amphilichas cucullus – or unidentified comparable form
- †Amygdalocystites
- †Anaspyroceras
  - †Anaspyroceras anellus
  - †Anaspyroceras calvini
  - †Anaspyroceras clermontense
  - †Anaspyroceras perroti
- †Anazyga
  - †Anazyga recurvirostra
- †Anolotichia
  - †Anolotichia impolita
- †Antiplectoceras – tentative report
- †Anulocrinus
  - †Anulocrinus forrestonensis
- †Aparchites
  - †Aparchites barbatus
  - †Aparchites carinatus
  - †Aparchites chatfieldensis
  - †Aparchites ellipticus
  - †Aparchites fimbriatus
  - †Aparchites macrus
  - †Aparchites paratumida
- †Apycnodiscus
- †Archaeocrinus
  - †Archaeocrinus obconicus
- †Archinacella
  - †Archinacella cingulata
  - †Archinacella deleta
  - †Archinacella simplex
  - †Archinacella simulatrix
  - †Archinacella valida
- †Aristerella
- †Armenoceras
  - †Armenoceras clermontense
  - †Armenoceras iowense
- †Arthroclema
  - †Arthroclema armatum
- †Arthropora
  - †Arthropora simplex
- †Arthrostylus
  - †Arthrostylus conjunctus
  - †Arthrostylus obliquus
- †Aspidopora
- †Astreptodictya
  - †Astreptodictya acuta
  - †Astreptodictya elegans
  - †Astreptodictya fimbriata
  - †Astreptodictya pumila
- †Astrocystites
- †Ateleocystites
  - †Ateleocystites guttenbergensis
- †Athrophragma
  - †Athrophragma foliata
- †Austinella
  - †Austinella kankakensis –

== B ==
- †Bairdiocypris –
  - †Bairdiocypris granti
- †Basilicus
  - †Basilicus barrandi
- †Bassleratia
  - †Bassleratia typa
- †Bathyurus
  - †Bathyurus longispinus
- †Batostoma
  - †Batostoma fertile
  - †Batostoma magnopora
  - †Batostoma winchelli
- †Bellimurina
  - †Bellimurina charlottae
- †Bellornatia
  - †Bellornatia tricollis
- †Belodina
  - †Belodina compressa
  - †Belodina confluens
- †Beloitoceras
  - †Beloitoceras carveri
  - †Beloitoceras grafense
  - †Beloitoceras houghtoni
  - †Beloitoceras huronense – or unidentified comparable form
  - †Beloitoceras janesvillense
  - †Beloitoceras lycum
  - †Beloitoceras norwoodi
  - †Beloitoceras pandion
  - †Beloitoceras plebeium
  - †Beloitoceras whitneyi
- †Berkeia – type locality for genus
  - †Berkeia typica – type locality for species
- †Beyrichia
  - †Beyrichia irregularis
- †Bodeiceras
  - †Bodeiceras oxygonium
- †Bollia
  - †Bollia regularis
  - †Bollia ruthae
  - †Bollia subaequata
  - †Bollia subaequeata
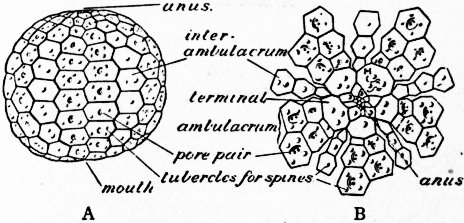
- Reconstructive diagram (left) of a fossil (right) of the Ordovician sea urchin Bothriocidaris. The short spines which were attached to the tubercles are not drawn.
  †Bothriocidaris
  - †Bothriocidaris solemi
- †Brachytomaria
  - †Brachytomaria semele
- †Bromidella
  - †Bromidella depressa
  - †Bromidella rhomboides
- †Bryantodina
  - †Bryantodina abrupta
  - †Bryantodina typicalis
- †Bucania
  - †Bucania elliptica
  - †Bucania halli
  - †Bucania minnesotensis
  - †Bucania sublata
- †Bullatella
  - †Bullatella granilabiatus
  - †Bullatella granlabiatus
- †Bumastoides
  - †Bumastoides milleri
  - †Bumastoides porrectus
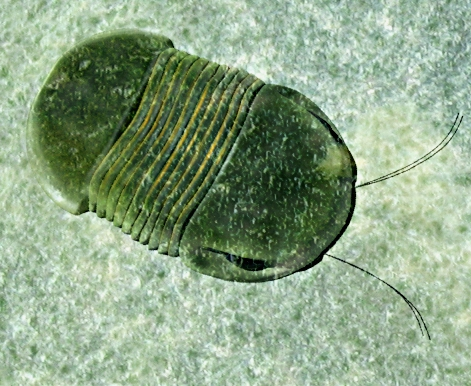
- Life restoration of the Early Ordovician-Silurian trilobite Bumastus
  †Bumastus
  - †Bumastus orbicaudatus
- †Byrsolopsina
  - †Byrsolopsina centipunctata
  - †Byrsolopsina normella
  - †Byrsolopsina ovata
  - †Byrsolopsina planilateralis
- Bythocypris
  - †Bythocypris curta
  - †Bythocypris furnishi
- †Bythopora
  - †Bythopora subgracilis –

== C ==
- †Calceocrinus
  - †Calceocrinus gossmani
  - †Calceocrinus levorsoni
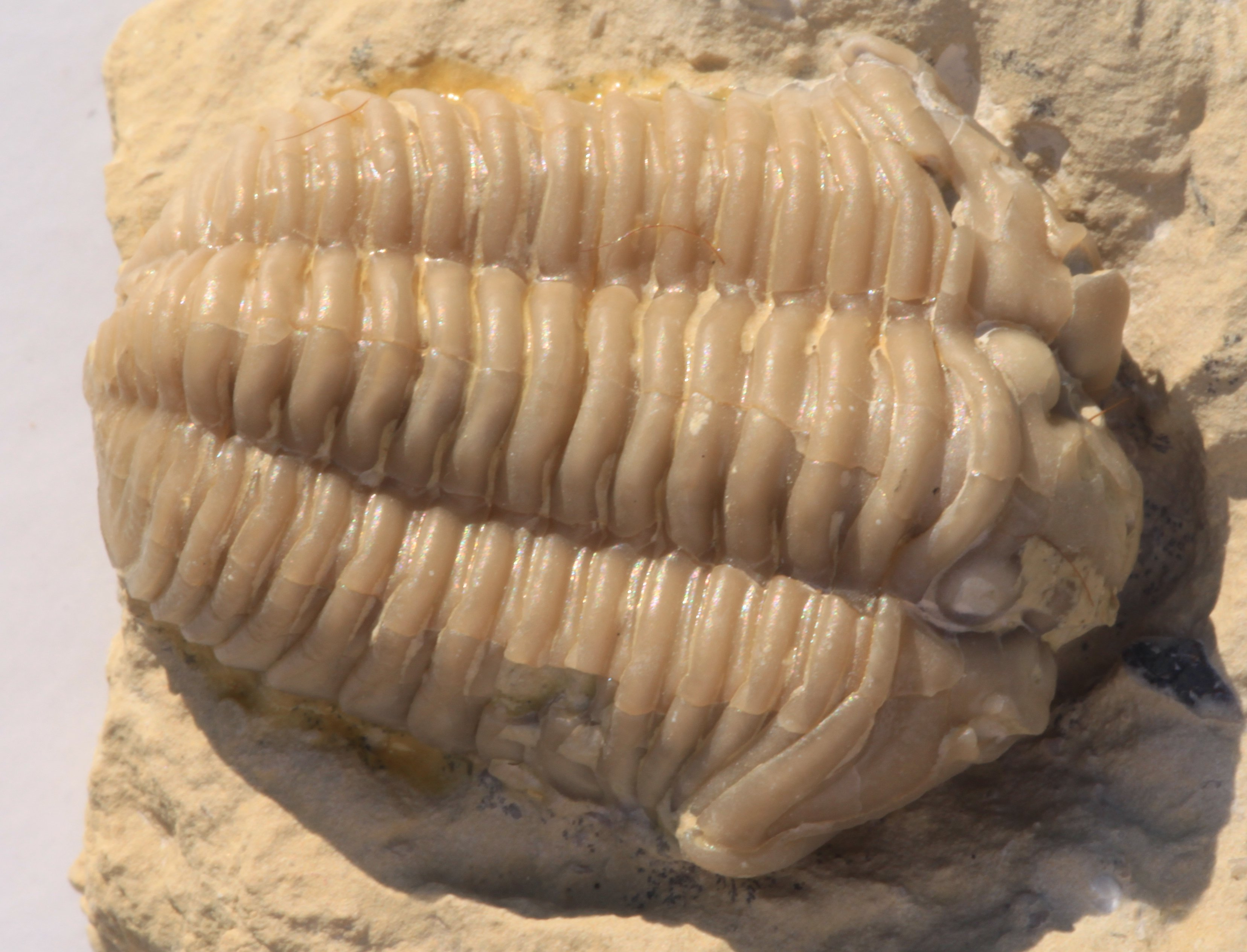
- Fossil of the Early Ordovician-Early Devonian trilobite Calymene
  †Calymene
  - †Calymene mamillate
  - †Calymene winchelli
- †Camaraspis
  - †Camaraspis convexus
- †Camaraspoides
  - †Camaraspoides berkeyi
- †Camellaspongia – type locality for genus
  - †Camellaspongia tumula – type locality for species
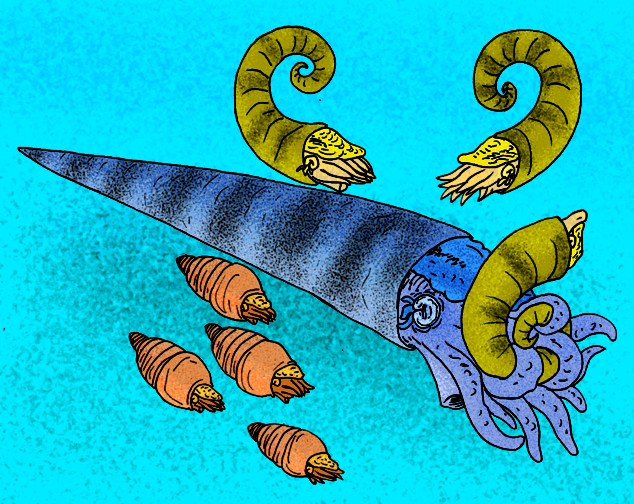
- Restoration of the Middle Ordovician-Silurian nautiloid cephalopod Cameroceras feeding on an Aphetoceras, while a quartet of Cyclostomiceras swim by
  †Cameroceras
  - †Cameroceras alternatum – or unidentified comparable form
  - †Cameroceras hennepini
  - †Cameroceras inopinatum – type locality for species
  - †Cameroceras stillwaterense – type locality for species
- †Campylorthis
  - †Campylorthis deflecta
- †Carabocrinus
  - †Carabocrinus dicyclicus
  - †Carabocrinus magnificus
  - †Carabocrinus oogyi
  - †Carabocrinus radiatus
  - †Carabocrinus slocomi
- †Carinaropsis
  - †Carinaropsis cymbula
  - †Carinaropsis minima
- †Cataschisma
  - †Cataschisma convexum
- †Centrocyrtoceras
  - †Centrocyrtoceras annulatum
  - †Centrocyrtoceras duplicostatum
  - †Centrocyrtoceras rotundum
- †Ceratopea
  - †Ceratopea canadensis
  - †Ceratopea parvum – type locality for species
  - †Ceratopea pygmaea – type locality for species
- †Ceratopsis
  - †Ceratopsis chambersi
  - †Ceratopsis humilinoda
  - †Ceratopsis quadrifida
- †Ceraurinella
  - †Ceraurinella scofieldi
  - †Ceraurinella templetoni
- †Ceraurinus
  - †Ceraurinus icarus
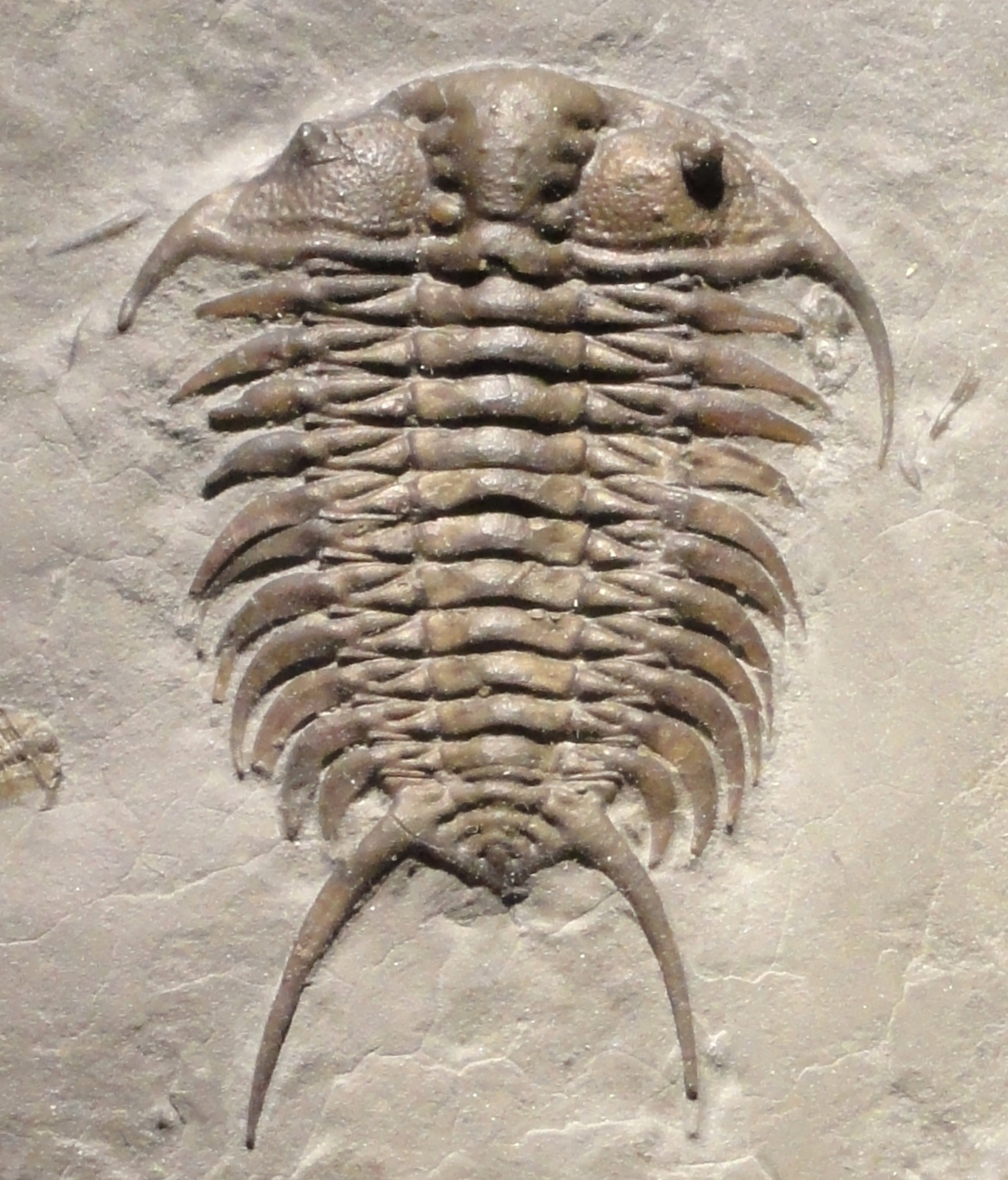
- Fossil of the Middle-Late Ordovician trilobite Ceraurus
  †Ceraurus
  - †Ceraurus pleurexanthemus
  - †Ceraurus pleurexanthomus
- †Charactoceras
  - †Charactoceras laddi
- †Chariocephalus
  - †Chariocephalus whitfieldi
- †Chasmatopora
  - †Chasmatopora reticulata
- †Cheilocephalus
  - †Cheilocephalus stcroixensis
- †Cheirocrinus
- †Chidleyenoceras
- †Chirognathus
  - †Chirognathus duodactylus
- †Cincinnaticrinus
  - †Cincinnaticrinus varibrachialus
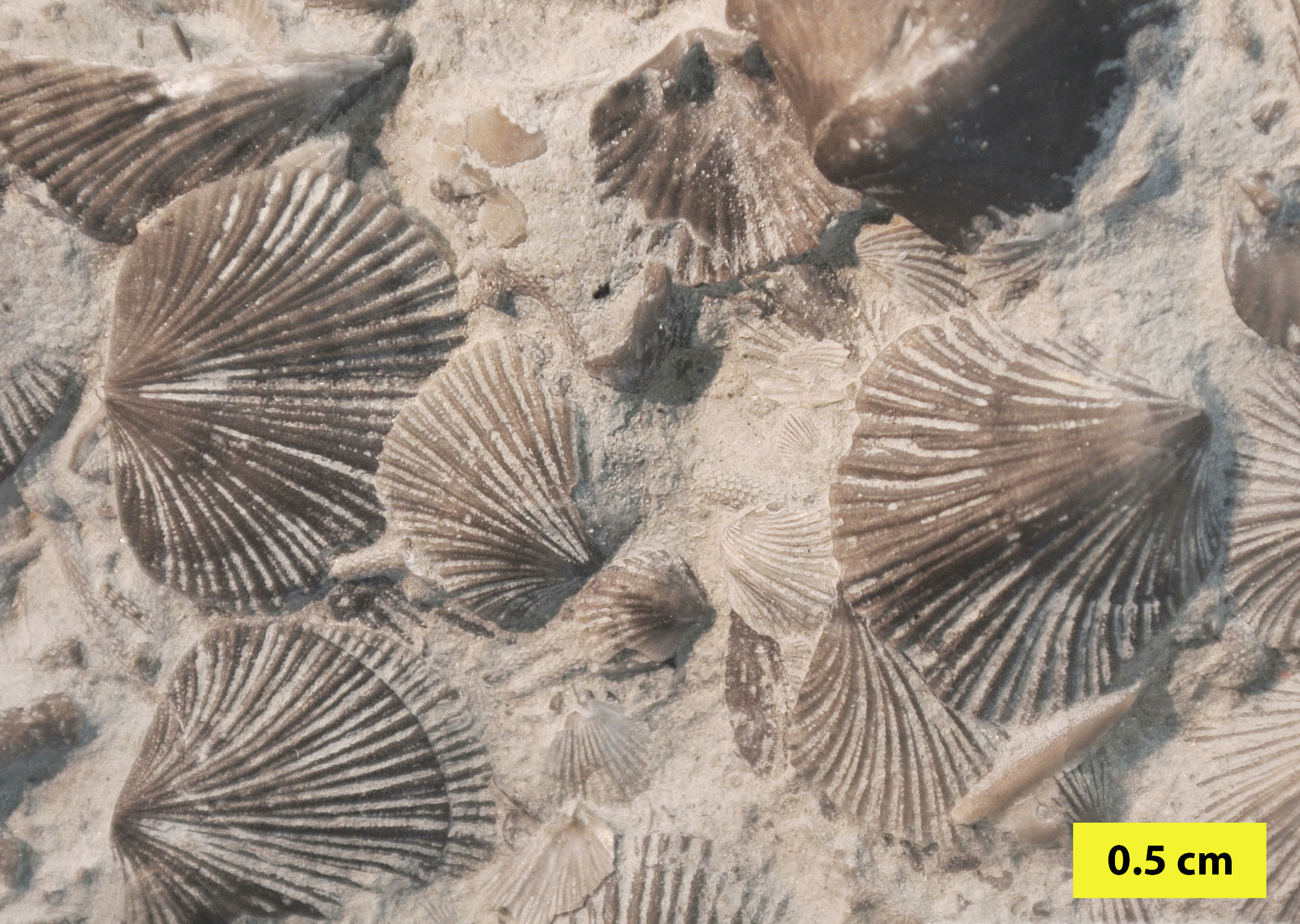
- Assemblage of fossilized shells of the Ordovician brachiopod Cincinnetina
  †Cincinnetina
  - †Cincinnetina minnesotensis – type locality for species
- †Clathrospira
  - †Clathrospira conica
  - †Clathrospira subconica
- †Cleiocrinus
- †Cleionychia
- †Coelocerodontus
  - †Coelocerodontus trigonius
- †Colpodon
- †Colpomya
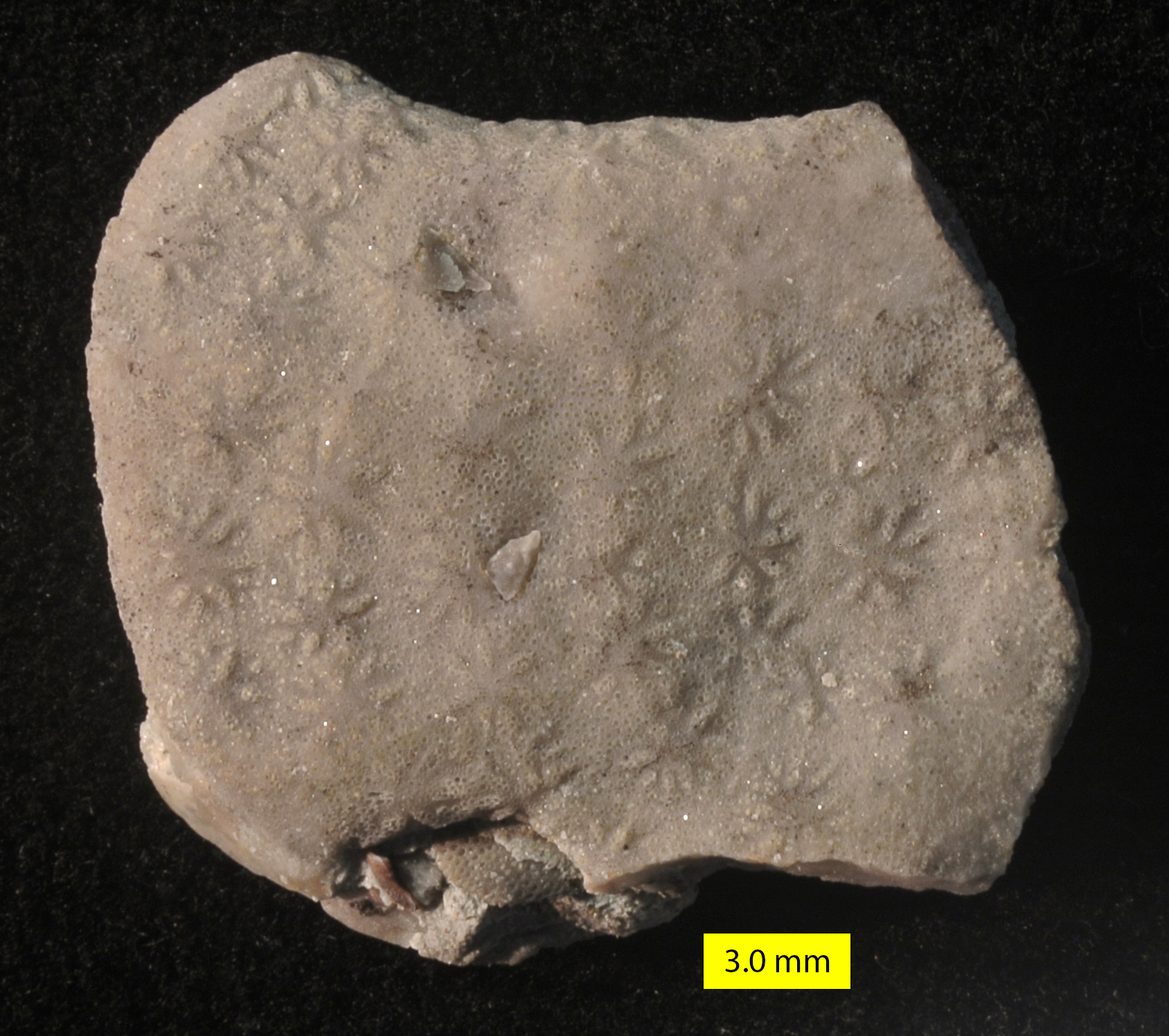
- Fossil of the Ordovician bryozoan Constellaria
  †Constellaria
  - †Constellaria varia
- †Conularia
- †Cordylodus
  - †Cordylodus delicatus
- †Cornites
- †Coronocystis
  - †Coronocystis durandensis
- †Cotteroceras
  - †Cotteroceras compressum
- †Cotylahindia – type locality for genus
  - †Cotylahindia panaca – type locality for species
- †Crania
  - †Crania reversa
- †Craniops
  - †Craniops minor
- †Cremacrinus
  - †Cremacrinus arctus
  - †Cremacrinus crossmani
  - †Cremacrinus gerki
  - †Cremacrinus guttenbergensis
  - †Cremacrinus punctatus
- †Cryptophyllus
  - †Cryptophyllus obloides
  - †Cryptophyllus oboloides
  - †Cryptophyllus sulcatus
- †Crytoniodus
  - †Crytoniodus complicatus
- †Ctenobolbina
  - †Ctenobolbina emaciata
  - †Ctenobolbina maquoketensis
- †Ctenodonta
  - †Ctenodonta novicea
  - †Ctenodonta oviformis – type locality for species
  - †Ctenodonta similis
  - †Ctenodonta subnasuta – type locality for species
- †Culumbodina
  - †Culumbodina penna
- †Cuneamya
- †Cupulocrinus
  - †Cupulocrinus canaliculatus
  - †Cupulocrinus conjugans
  - †Cupulocrinus graciis – or unidentified related form
  - †Cupulocrinus gracilis
  - †Cupulocrinus humilis
  - †Cupulocrinus jewetti
  - †Cupulocrinus latibrachiatus – or unidentified related form
  - †Cupulocrinus levorsoni
  - †Cupulocrinus molanderi
  - †Cupulocrinus plattevillensis
- †Curtognathus
- †Cyclocystoides
  - †Cyclocystoides halli
- †Cyclonema
  - †Cyclonema aiens
  - †Cyclonema percarinata
  - †Cyclonema textilis
  - †Cyclonema varicosum
- †Cyclospira
  - †Cyclospira bisulcata
- †Cymatonota
- †Cyptendoceras
  - †Cyptendoceras ruedemanni
- †Cyrtocerina
  - †Cyrtocerina crenulata
  - †Cyrtocerina schoolcrafti
- †Cyrtodonta
  - †Cyrtodonta descriptus
  - †Cyrtodonta dignus
  - †Cyrtodonta grandis
- †Cyrtodontula
  - †Cyrtodontula praecipita – type locality for species
- †Cyrtoizoceras
  - †Cyrtoizoceras minneapolis
- †Cyrtolites
  - †Cyrtolites dilatus
  - †Cyrtolites disjunctus
  - †Cyrtolites minor
  - †Cyrtolites ornatus
  - †Cyrtolites retrorsus
- †Cyrtonellopsis
  - †Cyrtonellopsis vetulum
- †Cyrtospira
  - †Cyrtospira wykoffensis
- †Cyrtostropha
  - †Cyrtostropha salteri –

== D ==
- †Daidia
  - †Daidia subconica – type locality for species
- †Dalmanella
  - †Dalmanella rara – or unidentified comparable form
  - †Dalmanella sculpta – tentative report
- †Dapsilodus
  - †Dapsilodus mutatus
- †Deceptrix
- †Deckeroceras
  - †Deckeroceras clermontense
- †Deiroceras
  - †Deiroceras scofieldi
- †Dekayella
  - †Dekayella praenuntia
- †Delotaxis
- †Dendrocrinus
  - †Dendrocrinus acutidactylus – or unidentified related form
  - †Dendrocrinus casei
- †Desmograptus
  - †Desmograptus cancellatus
- †Diceromyonia
  - †Diceromyonia ignota
- †Dicranella
  - †Dicranella bicornis
  - †Dicranella marginata
  - †Dicranella marinata
  - †Dicranella simplex
  - †Dicranella spinosa
  - †Dicranella typa
- †Diestoceras
  - †Diestoceras alceum
  - †Diestoceras clarkei
- †Dilobella
  - †Dilobella simplex
  - †Dilobella typa
- †Dinorthis
  - †Dinorthis pectinella
- †Diorthelasma
  - †Diorthelasma weissi – type locality for species
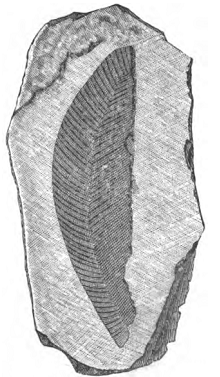
- Cambrian graptolite Diplograptus
  †Diplograptus
  - †Diplograptus peosta
- †Doleroides
  - †Doleroides pervetus
- †Dolichoharpes
  - †Dolichoharpes ottawaensis
- †Drepanoistodus
  - †Drepanoistodus suberectus
- †Drumaspis
  - †Drumaspis sabulosa
  - †Drumaspis tanycodia
- †Dvorakia
  - †Dvorakia chattertoni – type locality for species
  - †Dvorakia klapperi –

== E ==
- †Eccyliopterus
  - †Eccyliopterus owenanus
- †Ectenaspis
  - †Ectenaspis beckeri – type locality for species
- †Ectenocrinus
  - †Ectenocrinus raymondi
  - †Ectenocrinus simplex
- †Ectomaria
  - †Ectomaria pagoda
  - †Ectomaria prisca
- †Edrioaster
  - †Edrioaster bigsbyi
- †Ellesmeria
  - †Ellesmeria scobeyi
- †Ellesmeroceras
  - †Ellesmeroceras winonicum
- †Ellipsocephaloides
  - †Ellipsocephaloides curtus
  - †Ellipsocephaloides gracilis
- †Elliptocryprites
  - †Elliptocryprites paracylindrica – type locality for species
- †Elliptocyprites
  - †Elliptocyprites paracylindrica – type locality for species
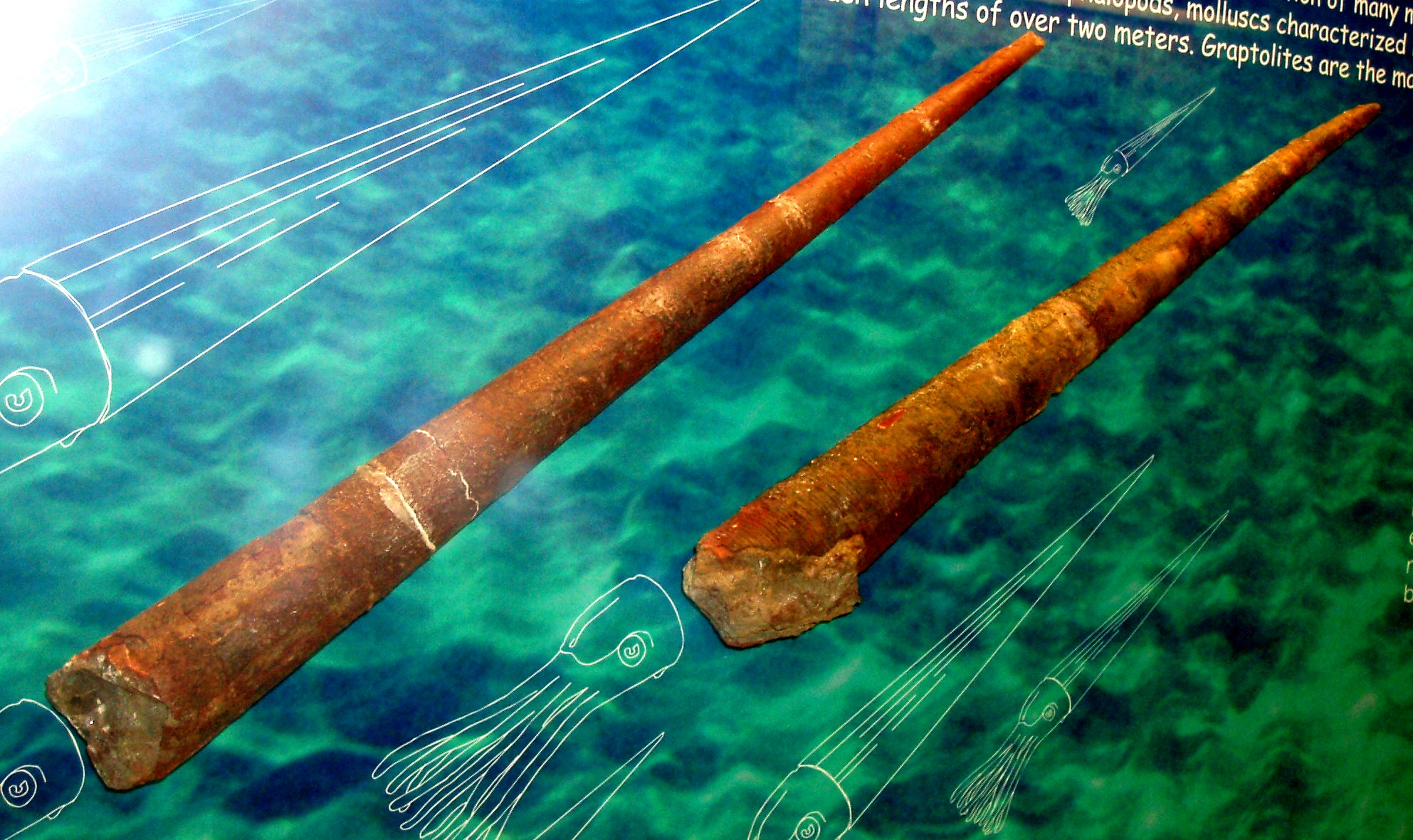
- Fossilized shells and restored appearances of the Middle-Late Ordovician nautiloid cephalopod Endoceras
  †Endoceras
  - †Endoceras atkinsonense
  - †Endoceras clarkei
  - †Endoceras clermontense
  - †Endoceras decorahense
  - †Endoceras eburneolum – type locality for species
  - †Endoceras fulgar
  - †Endoceras gracillimum
  - †Endoceras kayi
  - †Endoceras proteiforme
  - †Endoceras thomasi
- †Eobelodina
  - †Eobelodina hormacola
- †Eochonetes
  - †Eochonetes recedens
- †Eomonorachus
  - †Eomonorachus intermedius
- †Eoplectodonta
  - †Eoplectodonta recedens
  - †Eoplectodonta saxea
- †Eoschmidtella
  - †Eoschmidtella umbonata
- †Eotomaria
  - †Eotomaria dryope
  - †Eotomaria vicina
- †Ephippiorthoceras
  - †Ephippiorthoceras laddi
  - †Ephippiorthoceras tenuistriatum
- †Eremotrema – tentative report
  - †Eremotrema emacerata
- †Eridotrypa
  - †Eridotrypa aedilis
  - †Eridotrypa exigua
- †Erismodus
  - †Erismodus quadridactylus
- †Eroicaspira
  - †Eroicaspira bellicincta
- †Erratencrinurus
  - †Erratencrinurus vigilans
- †Escharopora
  - †Escharopora subrecta
- †Eukloedenella
  - †Eukloedenella richmondensis
- †Eumorphocystis
- †Eunema
  - †Eunema centralis
  - †Eunema concinnula
  - †Eunema helicteres
  - †Eunema quadrisulcata
  - †Eunema simile
- †Euomphalopsis
  - †Euomphalopsis depressa – type locality for species
- †Euprimitia
  - †Euprimitia celata
  - †Euprimitia labiosa
  - †Euprimitia linepunctata
  - †Euprimitia sanctipauli
- †Eurychilina
  - †Eurychilina cannonfallsensis – type locality for species
  - †Eurychilina depressa
  - †Eurychilina incurva
  - †Eurychilina kayi – type locality for species
  - †Eurychilina micropunctata – type locality for species
  - †Eurychilina minutifoveata
  - †Eurychilina partifimbriata
  - †Eurychilina reticulata
  - †Eurychilina subradiata
  - †Eurychilina sugarcreekensis – type locality for species
  - †Eurychilina ventrosa
- †Eurycystites
  - †Eurycystites granosus
- †Eurymya
  - †Eurymya plana
- †Eurystomites
  - †Eurystomites kelloggi –

== F ==
- †Fayettoceras – tentative report
  - †Fayettoceras beloitense
- †Fisherities
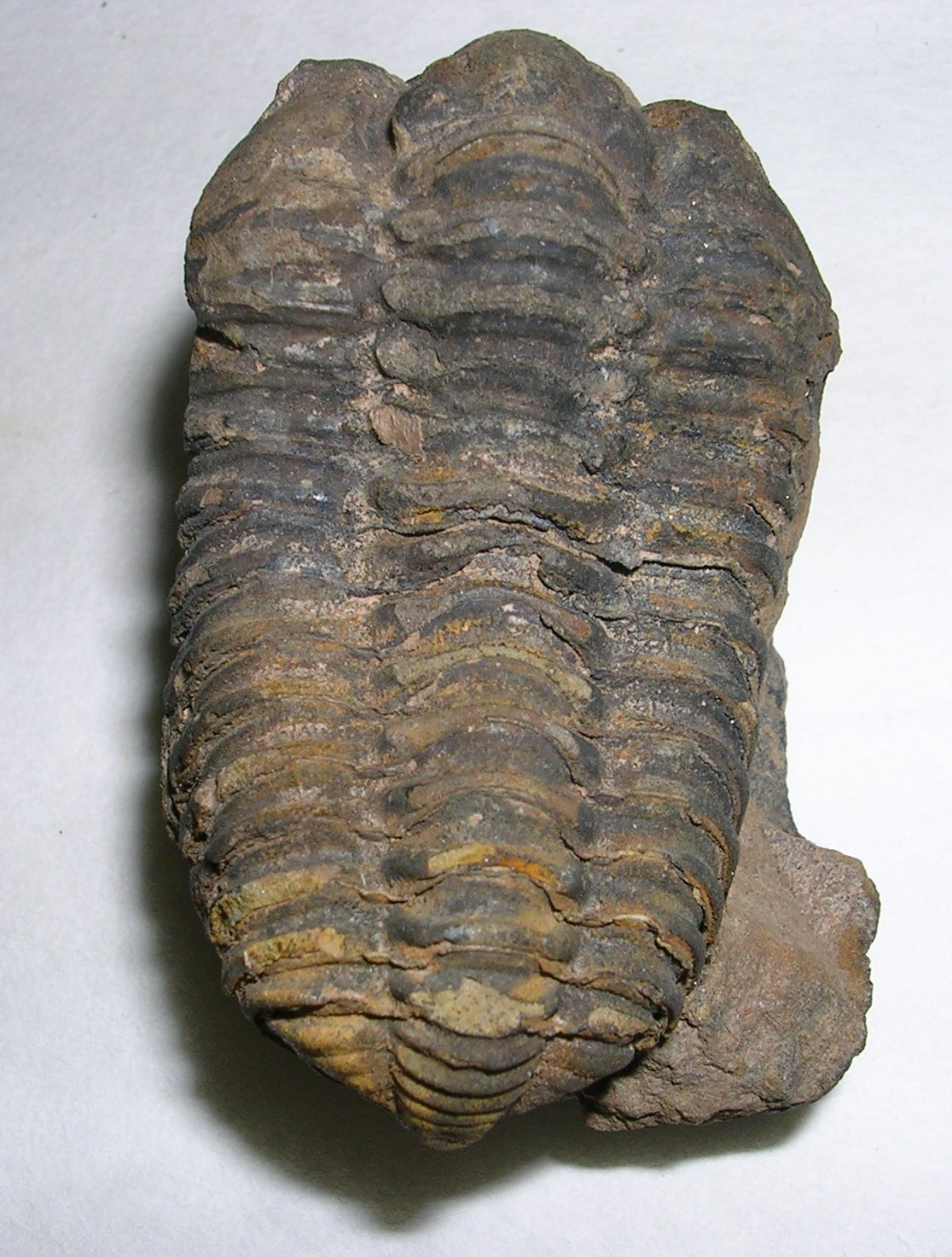
- Fossil of the Middle Ordovician-Silurian trilobite Flexicalymene
  †Flexicalymene
  - †Flexicalymene senaria
- †Floripatella
  - †Floripatella humilis
- †Furcitella
  - †Furcitella scofieldi
- †Fusispira
  - †Fusispira angusta
  - †Fusispira convexa
  - †Fusispira inflata
  - †Fusispira intermedia
  - †Fusispira nobilis
  - †Fusispira planulata
  - †Fusispira spicula
  - †Fusispira subbrevis
  - †Fusispira subfusiformis
  - †Fusispira ventricosa
  - †Fusispira vittata –

== G ==
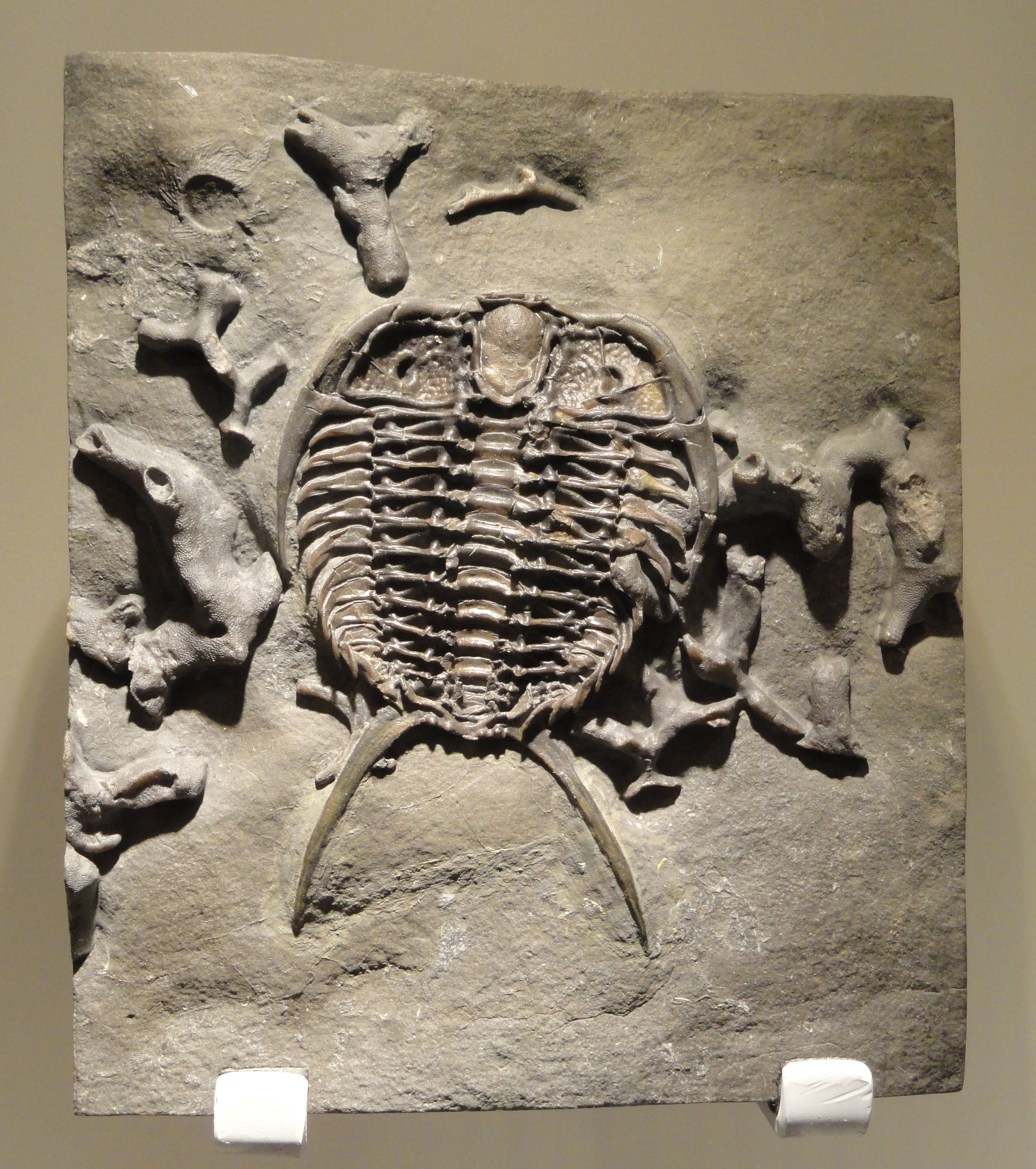
- Gabriceraurus dentatus
  †Gabriceraurus
  - †Gabriceraurus mifflinensis
- †Geisonoceras
  - †Geisonoceras clermontense
  - †Geisonoceras scofieldi
- †Globonema
  - †Globonema niota
- †Glyptocrinus
  - †Glyptocrinus ornatus – or unidentified related form
  - †Glyptocrinus pustulosis
  - †Glyptocrinus tridactylus
- †Glyptocystites
- †Glyptocystitid – type locality for genus
- †Glyptorthis
  - †Glyptorthis bellarugosa
  - †Glyptorthis insculpta
- †Gonioceras
  - †Gonioceras anceps
  - †Gonioceras homerense
  - †Gonioceras kayi
  - †Gonioceras occidentale
- †Goniophora
  - †Goniophora absimilis
- †Gorbyoceras
- †Graptodictya
  - †Graptodictya proava
  - †Graptodictya simplex
- †Grenprisa
  - †Grenprisa billingsi
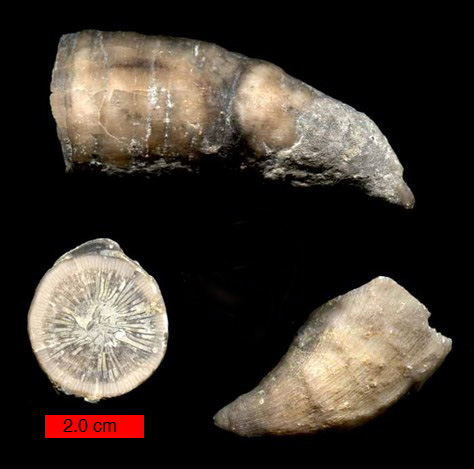
- Multiple views of a fossil of the Ordovician horn coral Grewingkia
  †Grewingkia
- †Gyronema
  - †Gyronema pulchellum
  - †Gyronema semicarinatum –

== H ==
- †Hallatia
  - †Hallatia convexa
  - †Hallatia duplicata
  - †Hallatia particylindrica
- †Halliella
  - †Halliella magnipunctata
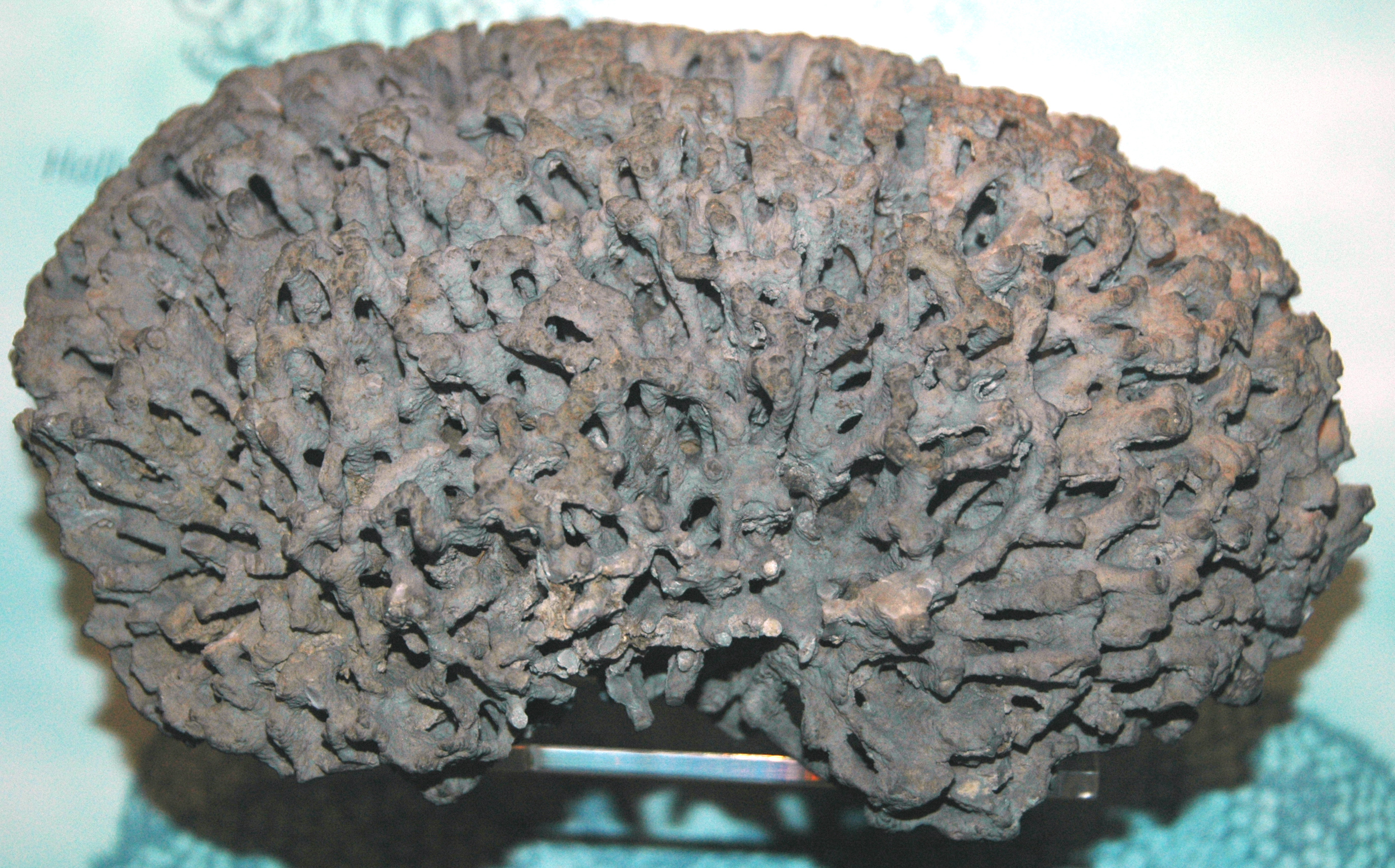
- Fossil of the Ordovician bryozoan ("moss animal") Hallopora
  †Hallopora
  - †Hallopora dumalis
  - †Hallopora goodhuensis
  - †Hallopora multitabulata
  - †Hallopora undulata
- †Hebertella
  - †Hebertella occidentalis
- †Hebetoceras – tentative report
- †Helcionopsis
  - †Helcionopsis depressum
  - †Helcionopsis wisconsinensis
- †Helicotoma
  - †Helicotoma planulata
- †Helopora
  - †Helopora divaricata
- †Hemicystites
  - †Hemicystites curtus
  - †Hemicystites paulianus
- †Hemiphragma
  - †Hemiphragma irrasum
  - †Hemiphragma tenuimurale
- †Hesperidella
  - †Hesperidella initialis
- †Hesperorthis
  - †Hesperorthis tricenaria
- †Hindia
  - †Hindia sphaeroidalis
- †Hiscobeccus
  - †Hiscobeccus capax
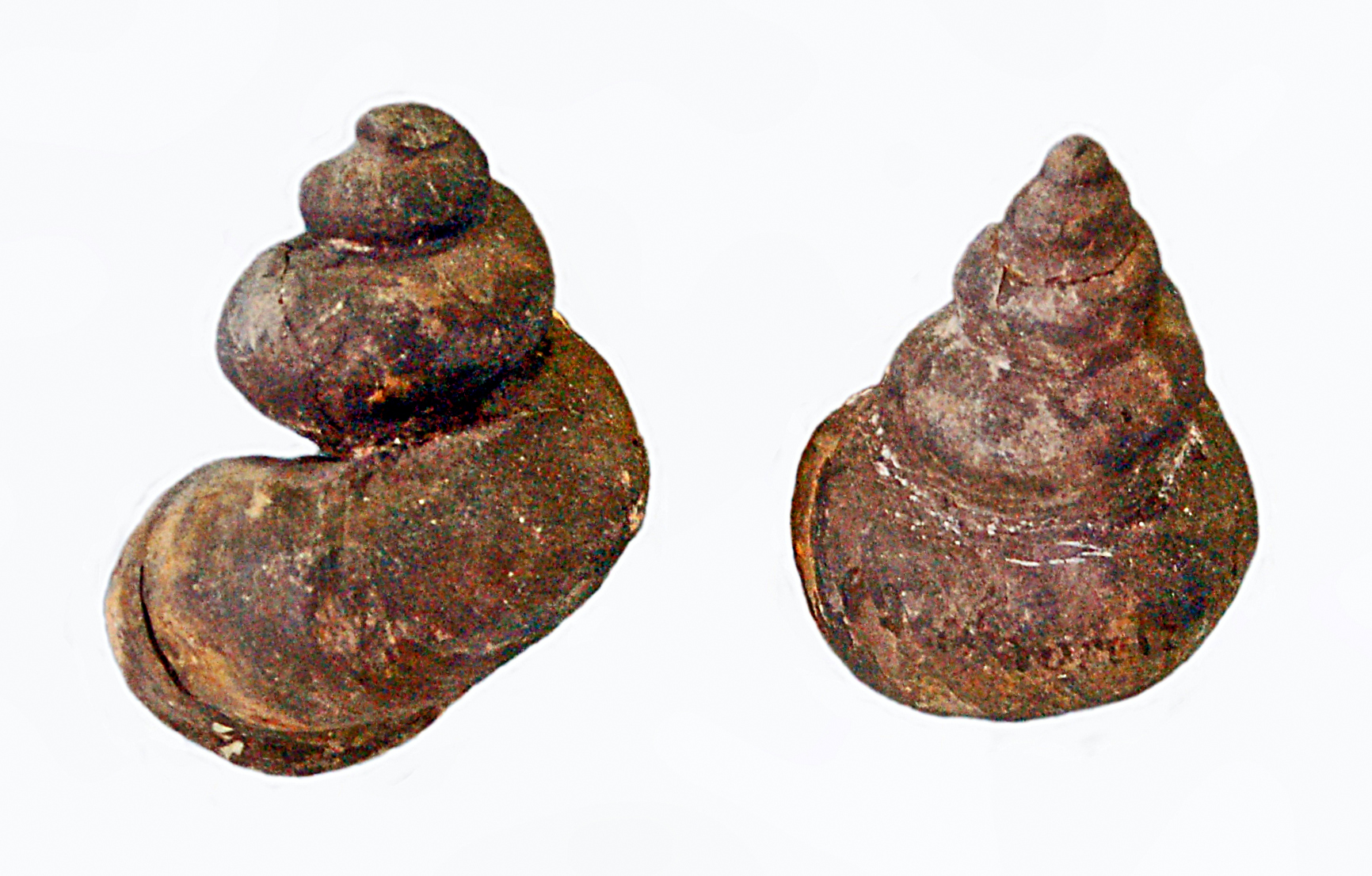
- Fossilized shells of the Ordovician-Carboniferous sea snail Holopea
  †Holopea
  - †Holopea ampla
  - †Holopea appressa
  - †Holopea concinnula
  - †Holopea excelsa
  - †Holopea insignis
  - †Holopea obliqua
  - †Holopea paludiniformis
  - †Holopea pyrene
  - †Holopea rotunda
  - †Holopea similis
  - †Holopea supraplana
- †Holtedahilina
  - †Holtedahilina emaciata
- †Homotrypa
  - †Homotrypa subramosa
- †Homotrypella
  - †Homotrypella cribrosa
  - †Homotrypella hospitalis
  - †Homotrypella instabilis
- †Horiostomella
- †Hormotoma
  - †Hormotoma artemesia
  - †Hormotoma cassina
  - †Hormotoma gracilis
  - †Hormotoma minnesotensis
  - †Hormotoma multivolvis
  - †Hormotoma neglecta
  - †Hormotoma oehlerti
  - †Hormotoma subangulata
- †Hudsonaster
  - †Hudsonaster narrawayi
  - †Hudsonaster rugosus – or unidentified related form
- †Hybocrinus
  - †Hybocrinus conicus
- †Hypseloconus – type locality for genus
  - †Hypseloconus cornutiformis – type locality for species
  - †Hypseloconus elongatus – type locality for species
- †Hypsiptycha
  - †Hypsiptycha anticostiensis –

== I ==
- †Icriodella
  - †Icriodella superba
- †Icriodus
  - †Icriodus calvini – type locality for species
  - †Icriodus orri – type locality for species
- †Idahoia
  - †Idahoia serapia
  - †Idahoia serapio
  - †Idahoia wisconsensis
- †Idiospira
  - †Idiospira panderi
- †Illaenus
  - †Illaenus americanus
- †Ischadites
  - †Ischadites iowensis
- †Isorthoceras
  - †Isorthoceras junceum
  - †Isorthoceras sociale
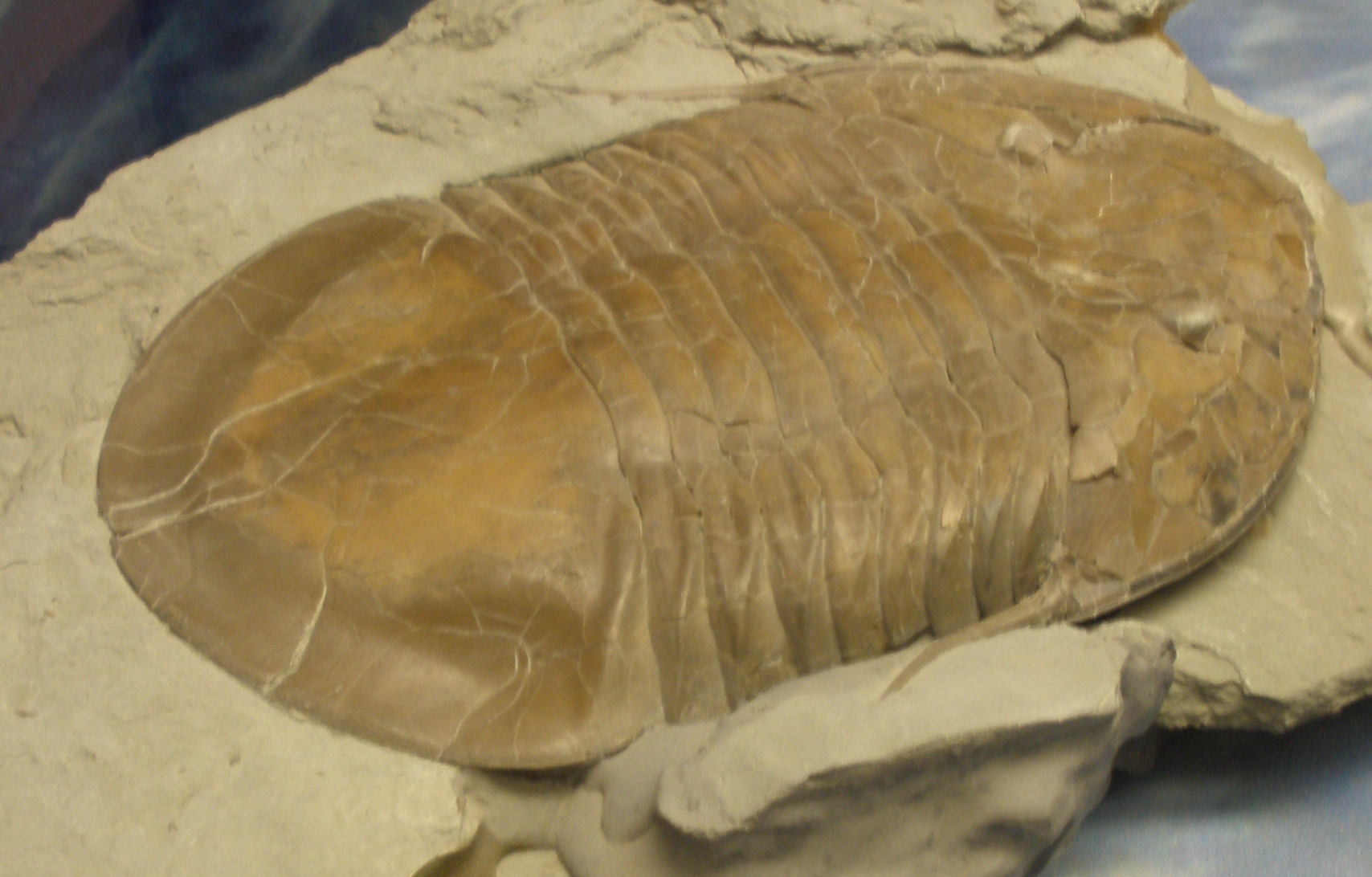
- Fossil of the Middle-Late Ordovician giant trilobite Isotelus.
  †Isotelus
  - †Isotelus gigas
  - †Isotelus iowensis
  - †Isotelus simplex
  - †Isotelus susae
- †Isotomocrinus
  - †Isotomocrinus minutus –

== K ==
- †Kentlandoceras –
  - †Kentlandoceras husseyi
  - †Kentlandoceras schrocki – or unidentified comparable form
- †Kiesowia – tentative report
  - †Kiesowia verrucosa
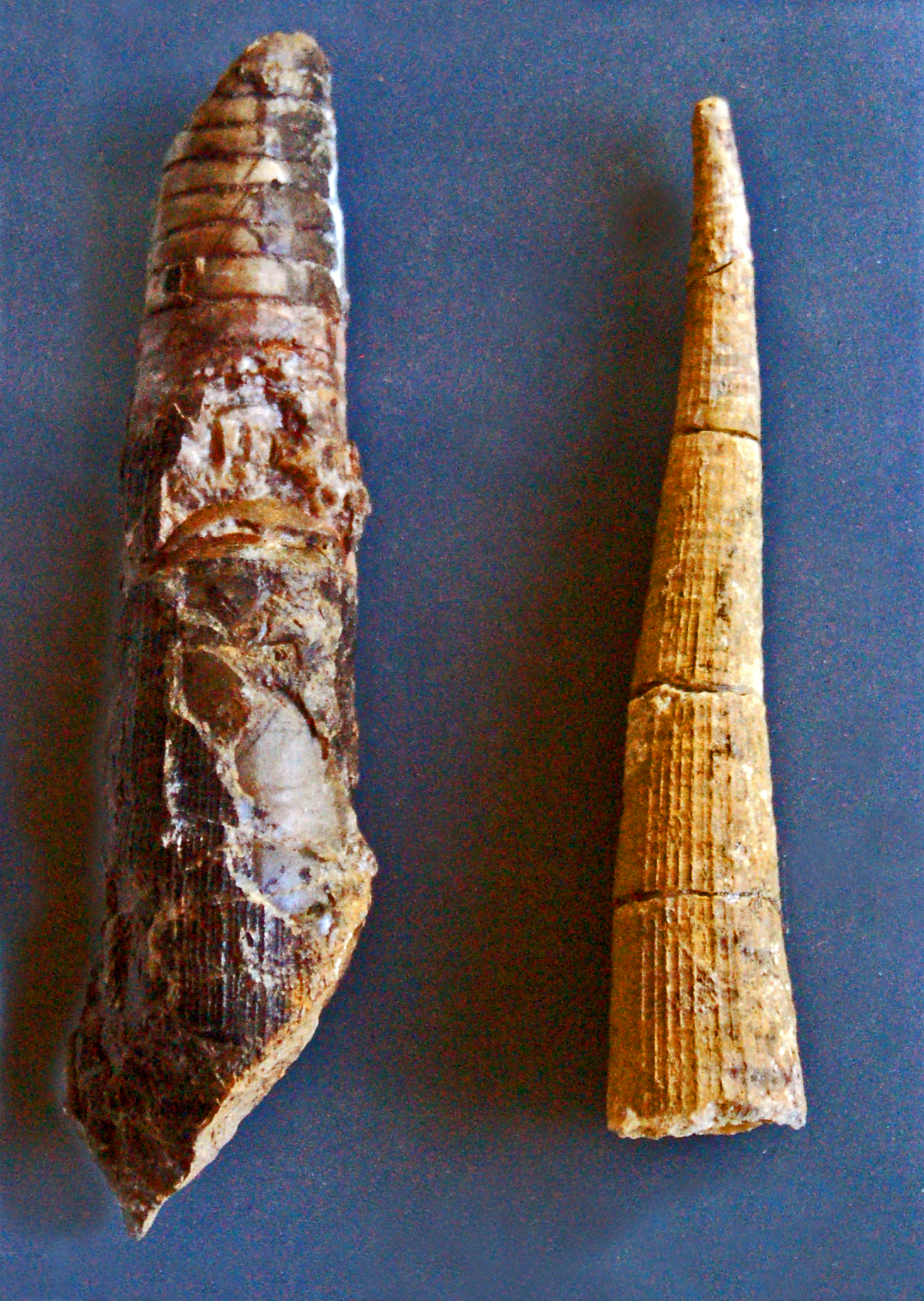
- Fossilized shells of the Middle Ordovician-Permian nautiloid cephalopod Kionoceras
  †Kionoceras
  - †Kionoceras decorahense
  - †Kionoceras postvillense
  - †Kionoceras tenuitectum
  - †Kionoceras thomasi
- †Kirengella
  - †Kirengella rectilateralis – type locality for species
  - †Kirengella stabilis – type locality for species
- †Kokenospira
  - †Kokenospira costalis – type locality for species
- †Krausella
  - †Krausella arcuata
  - †Krausella curtispina
  - †Krausella inaequalis
  - †Krausella variata –

== L ==
- †Laccoprimitia
  - †Laccoprimitia fillmorensis
- †Laddella
  - †Laddella insueta
- †Lambeoceras
  - †Lambeoceras confertum
  - †Lambeoceras cultratum – or unidentified comparable form
- †Lecanospira
  - †Lecanospira transversocordatus – type locality for species
- †Leperditella
  - †Leperditella fryei
  - †Leperditella macra
  - †Leperditella millepunctata
  - †Leperditella persimilis
- †Lepidocyclus
  - †Lepidocyclus laddi
- †Lesueurilla
  - †Lesueurilla beloitensis
- †Lichenaria
  - †Lichenaria typa
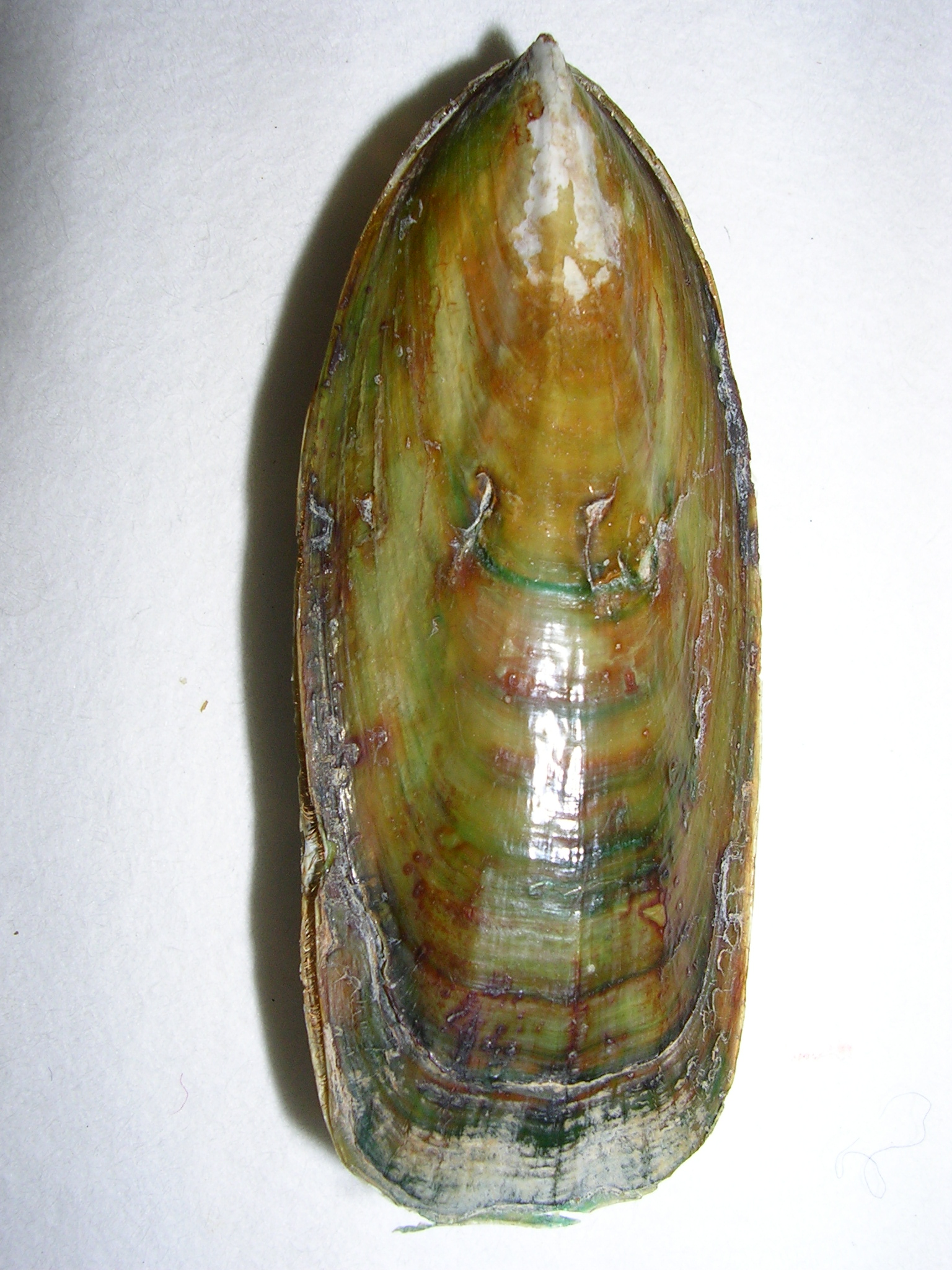
- Shell of the Cambrian-modern brachiopod Lingula
  †Lingula
  - †Lingula morsei
  - †Lingula philomela
- †Lingulasma
  - †Lingulasma galenensis
- †Lingulops
- †Liospira
  - †Liospira americana
  - †Liospira angustata
  - †Liospira decipens
  - †Liospira micula
  - †Liospira modesta
  - †Liospira obtusa
  - †Liospira progne
  - †Liospira vitruvia
- †Loganoceras
- †Lophospira
  - †Lophospira decursa
  - †Lophospira major
  - †Lophospira milleri
  - †Lophospira obliqua
  - †Lophospira perangulata – type locality for species
  - †Lophospira serrulata
  - †Lophospira spironema
  - †Lophospira ventricosa
- †Loxobucania
  - †Loxobucania emmonsi
  - †Loxobucania lindsleyi
- †Lyrodesma
  - †Lyrodesma cannonense – type locality for species
- †Lytospira
  - †Lytospira subrotunda
  - †Lytospira undulatus –

== M ==
- †Maclurina
  - †Maclurina bigsbyi
  - †Maclurina manitobensis
- †Maclurites
  - †Maclurites crassa
  - †Maclurites cuneata
  - †Maclurites depressus
  - †Maclurites nitidus
  - †Maclurites subrotunda
- Macrocypris
  - †Macrocypris kayi
- †Macrocyproides
  - †Macrocyproides clermontensis
- †Macrocyprus
  - †Macrocyprus kayi
- †Macronotella
  - †Macronotella arcta
  - †Macronotella scofeldi
  - †Macronotella scofieldi
- †Manespira
  - †Manespira nicolleti
- †Manitoulinoceras
  - †Manitoulinoceras neleum
  - †Manitoulinoceras warsawense
  - †Manitoulinoceras wykoffense
- †Maratia
  - †Maratia mana
  - †Maratia mara
  - †Maratia micula
- †Matheria
- †Megamyonia
  - †Megamyonia unicostata
- †Merocrinus
  - †Merocrinus britonensis
- †Metaspyroceras
  - †Metaspyroceras clarkei
  - †Metaspyroceras minneapolis
  - †Metaspyroceras nicolleti
  - †Metaspyroceras perlineatum
  - †Metaspyroceras wisconsinense
- †Michelinoceras
  - †Michelinoceras beltrami
  - †Michelinoceras multicameratum
- †Microcoelodus
- †Milleratia
  - †Milleratia cincinnatiensis
- †Mitoclema
  - †Mitoclema mundulum
- †Mixoconus
  - †Mixoconus primus
- †Modiolodon
- †Modiolopsis
  - †Modiolopsis fountainensis
  - †Modiolopsis gregalis
  - †Modiolopsis nana – type locality for species
- †Monocheilus
  - †Monocheilus anatinum
  - †Monocheilus micros
- †Monocyclic
  - †Monocyclic inadunate
- †Monotrypa
- †Multioistodus
- †Myeinocystites
  - †Myeinocystites crossmani –

== N ==
- †Nanno
  - †Nanno aulema
- †Nasutimena
  - †Nasutimena fluctuosa – or unidentified comparable form
- †Nematopora
  - †Nematopora conferta
  - †Nematopora consueta
  - †Nematopora ovalis
- †Neobothriocidaris
  - †Neobothriocidaris templetoni
- †Neocoleodus
- †Neopanderodus
- †Ningulella
  - †Ningulella paucisulcata
- †Nodambichilina
  - †Nodambichilina symmetrica
- †Nuculites –

== O ==
- †Oepikina
  - †Oepikina inquassa
  - †Oepikina minnesotensis
- †Oistodus
  - †Oistodus abundans
  - †Oistodus venustus
- †Omospira
  - †Omospira laticincta
  - †Omospira trentonensis
- †Oneotodus
  - †Oneotodus ovatus
- †Onniella
  - †Onniella porrecta
  - †Onniella quadrata
- †Onoceras
  - †Onoceras abruptum
  - †Onoceras douglassi
  - †Onoceras tetreauvillense
- †Ophileta
- †Ophiletina
  - †Ophiletina angularis
  - †Ophiletina fausta
  - †Ophiletina sublaxa
- †Opikatia
  - †Opikatia emaciata
  - †Opikatia rotunda
- †Orbiculoidea
  - †Orbiculoidea lamellosa – or unidentified comparable form
  - †Orbiculoidea pelopea
- †Ormoceras – tentative report
  - †Ormoceras maquoketense
- †Orthoceras
  - †Orthoceras beltrami
  - †Orthoceras minnesotense
- †Orthodesma
  - †Orthodesma canaliculatum
  - †Orthodesma caniculatum
  - †Orthodesma litoralis
- †Orthograptus
- †Oulodus
  - †Oulodus serratus
- †Oxoplecia
  - †Oxoplecia ulrichi
- †Ozarkodina
  - †Ozarkodina concinna
  - †Ozarkodina delecta
  - †Ozarkodina raaschi –

== P ==
- †Pachydictya
  - †Pachydictya elegans
- †Pachyglossella
  - †Pachyglossella elderi
  - †Pachyglossella riciniformis
- †Palaeocrinus
  - †Palaeocrinus angulatus
- †Palaeoglossa
  - †Palaeoglossa hurlburti
- †Palaeoneilo
- †Paleocrinus
  - †Paleocrinus angulatus
- †Panderodus
  - †Panderodus feulneri
  - †Panderodus gracilis
  - †Panderodus panderi
- †Parabolbina
  - †Parabolbina antecedans
  - †Parabolbina carinifera
  - †Parabolbina staufferi
- †Paraliospira
  - †Paraliospira abrupta
  - †Paraliospira supracingulata
- †Paraschmidtella
  - †Paraschmidtella irregularis
  - †Paraschmidtella uphami
- †Parastrophina
  - †Parastrophina berensis
  - †Parastrophina bernensis
  - †Parastrophina rotundiformis
- †Parenthatia
  - †Parenthatia camerata
  - †Parenthatia punctata
- †Parschmidtella
  - †Parschmidtella uphami
- †Paucicrura
  - †Paucicrura corpulenta
  - †Paucicrura rogata
- †Paupospira
  - †Paupospira burginensis
  - †Paupospira elevata
  - †Paupospira oweni
  - †Paupospira sumnerensis
- †Pedomphalella
  - †Pedomphalella intermedia
  - †Pedomphalella subovata
- †Periglyptocrinus
  - †Periglyptocrinus spinuliferus
- †Periodon
  - †Periodon grandis
- †Petrocrania
  - †Petrocrania halli
  - †Petrocrania trentonensis
- †Phialaspongia – type locality for genus
  - †Phialaspongia fossa – type locality for species
- †Phragmodus
  - †Phragmodus cognitus
  - †Phragmodus inflexus
  - †Phragmodus undatus
- †Phragmolites
  - †Phragmolites compressus
  - †Phragmolites dyeri
  - †Phragmolites fimbriata
  - †Phragmolites obliquus
  - †Phragmolites triangularis
- †Phyllodictya
  - †Phyllodictya varia
- †Pinodema
  - †Pinodema conradi
- †Pionodema
  - †Pionodema circularis
  - †Pionodema subaequata
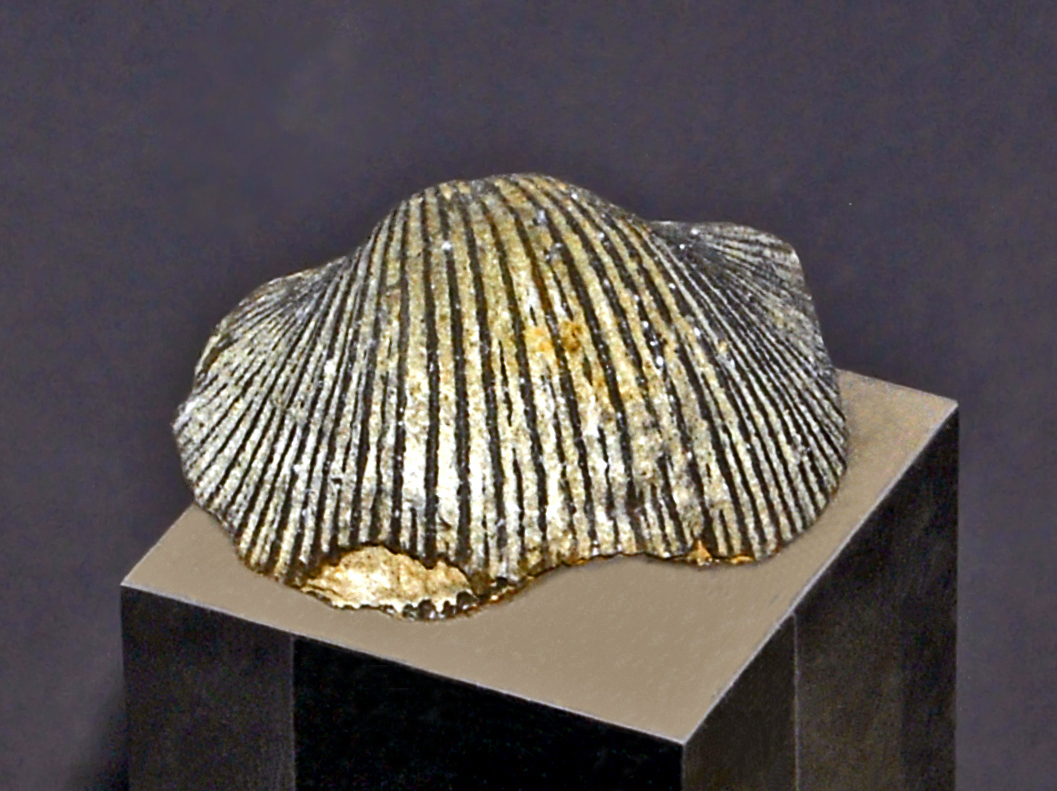
- Fossilized shell of the Ordovician brachiopod Plaesiomys
  †Plaesiomys
  - †Plaesiomys meedsi
  - †Plaesiomys proavitus
  - †Plaesiomys subquadrata
- †Platystrophia
  - †Platystrophia amoena
  - †Platystrophia biforata
  - †Platystrophia extensa – tentative report
  - †Platystrophia trentonensis
- †Plectoceras
  - †Plectoceras occidentale
  - †Plectoceras robertsoni
- †Plectodina
  - †Plectodina aculeata
  - †Plectodina tenuis
- †Plectorthis
  - †Plectorthis plicatella
- †Plethocardia
  - †Plethocardia suberecta
- †Plethospira
  - †Plethospira cannonensis – type locality for species
  - †Plethospira cassina
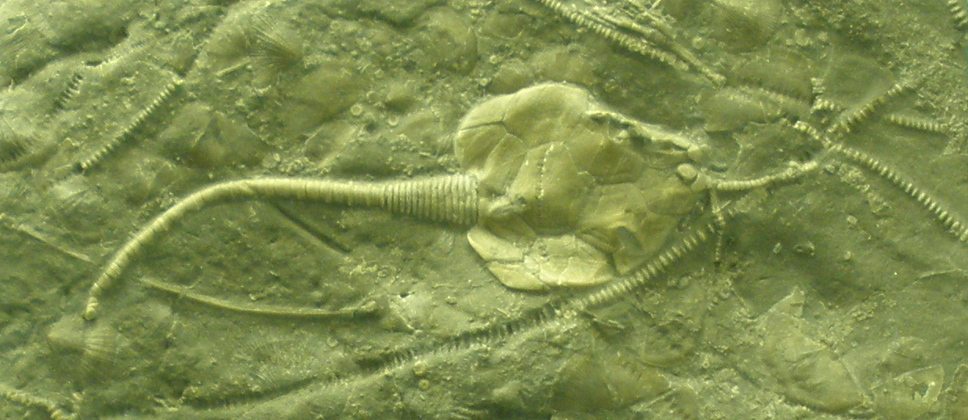
- Fossil of the Late Ordovician cystoid echinoderm Pleurocystites
  †Pleurocystites
  - †Pleurocystites squamosus
- †Polygammoceras
  - †Polygammoceras prestonense
- †Polygnathus
  - †Polygnathus curtigladius
  - †Polygnathus intermedius
  - †Polygnathus linguiformis
  - †Polygnathus parawebbi
- †Polygrammoceras
  - †Polygrammoceras prestonense
- †Polyplacognathus
  - †Polyplacognathus ramosus
- †Porocrinus
  - †Porocrinus elegans
  - †Porocrinus fayettensis
  - †Porocrinus pentagonius
  - †Porocrinus smithi – or unidentified related form
- †Praepleurocystis
- †Prasopora
  - †Prasopora insularis
- †Primitella
  - †Primitella constricta
  - †Primitella plattevillensis
- †Primitia
  - †Primitia cannonensis – type locality for species
  - †Primitia gibbera
  - †Primitia mammata
  - †Primitia spinata
  - †Primitia tumidula
- †Primitiella
  - †Primitiella bellevuensis
  - †Primitiella carlei
  - †Primitiella constricta
  - †Primitiella milleri
  - †Primitiella plattevillensis
- †Primitiopsis – tentative report
  - †Primitiopsis bella
- †Probillingsites
  - †Probillingsites milleri
  - †Probillingsites pronis
  - †Probillingsites welleri
- †Prolobella
- †Promopalaeaster
  - †Promopalaeaster wilsoni
- †Proplina
  - †Proplina convexum – type locality for species
  - †Proplina cornutaformis – type locality for species
  - †Proplina corpulentum – type locality for species
  - †Proplina extensum – type locality for species
- †Prosaukia
  - †Prosaukia ambigua
  - †Prosaukia misa
- †Proteroconus
  - †Proteroconus capuloides – type locality for species
- †Protopanderodus
  - †Protopanderodus liripipus
- †Pseudagnostus
  - †Pseudagnostus josephus
- †Pseudolingula
  - †Pseudolingula eva
  - †Pseudolingula iowensis
- †Pseudoprimitella
  - †Pseudoprimitella unicornis
- †Pseudulrichia
  - †Pseudulrichia simplex
- †Psuedulrichia
  - †Psuedulrichia simplex
- †Pterinea
- †Pterotheca
  - †Pterotheca attenuata
- †Pterygometopus
  - †Pterygometopus sclerops – or unidentified comparable form
- †Ptiloconus
- †Ptilodictya – tentative report
- †Ptychaspis
  - †Ptychaspis granulosa
  - †Ptychaspis miniscaensis
  - †Ptychaspis striata
  - †Ptychaspis tuberosa
- †Ptychocrinus
- †Punctaparchites
  - †Punctaparchites rugosus
  - †Punctaparchites splendens
- †Pycnocrinus
  - †Pycnocrinus gerki
  - †Pycnocrinus multibrachialis
  - †Pycnocrinus sardesoni
- †Pyrgocystis
  - †Pyrgocystis sardesoni –

== Q ==
- †Quasibollia –
  - †Quasibollia persulcata
  - †Quasibollia ridicula
- †Quienquecaudex
  - †Quienquecaudex springeri –

== R ==
- †Rafinesquina –
  - †Rafinesquina deltoidea
  - †Rafinesquina nitans
  - †Rafinesquina trentonensis
- †Raphistoma
  - †Raphistoma shakopeense – type locality for species
- †Raphistomina
  - †Raphistomina lapicida
  - †Raphistomina rugata
- †Raymondatia
  - †Raymondatia goniglypta
- †Redpathoceras – tentative report
- †Reedsoceras
  - †Reedsoceras macrostomum
- †Reteocrinus
  - †Reteocrinus rocktonensis
  - †Reteocrinus spinosus
- †Rhaphanocrinus
  - †Rhaphanocrinus buckleyi
- †Rhaphistomina
  - †Rhaphistomina rugata
- †Rhinidictya
- †Rhynchotrema
  - †Rhynchotrema ainsliei
  - †Rhynchotrema laticosta
  - †Rhynchotrema wisconsinense
- †Rhytimya
- †Richardsonoceras
  - †Richardsonoceras beloitense
  - †Richardsonoceras clarkei
  - †Richardsonoceras romingeri
  - †Richardsonoceras scofieldi
  - †Richardsonoceras simplex
- †Rigidella
  - †Rigidella cannonensis – type locality for species
- †Rioceras
  - †Rioceras consuetum – tentative report
- †Rosticellula
  - †Rosticellula colei
- Rostricellula
  - †Rostricellula minnesotensis –

== S ==
- †Saccelatia
  - †Saccelatia angularis
  - †Saccelatia arcuamuralis
  - †Saccelatia arrecta
  - †Saccelatia bullata
  - †Saccelatia cletifera
- †Saffordia
- †Salpingostoma
  - †Salpingostoma buelli
  - †Salpingostoma imbricata
  - †Salpingostoma sculptilis
- †Saratogia
  - †Saratogia hamula
- †Scaevogyra
  - †Scaevogyra swezeyi – type locality for species
- †Scalenocystites
  - †Scalenocystites strimplei
- †Scalites
  - †Scalites peracutum
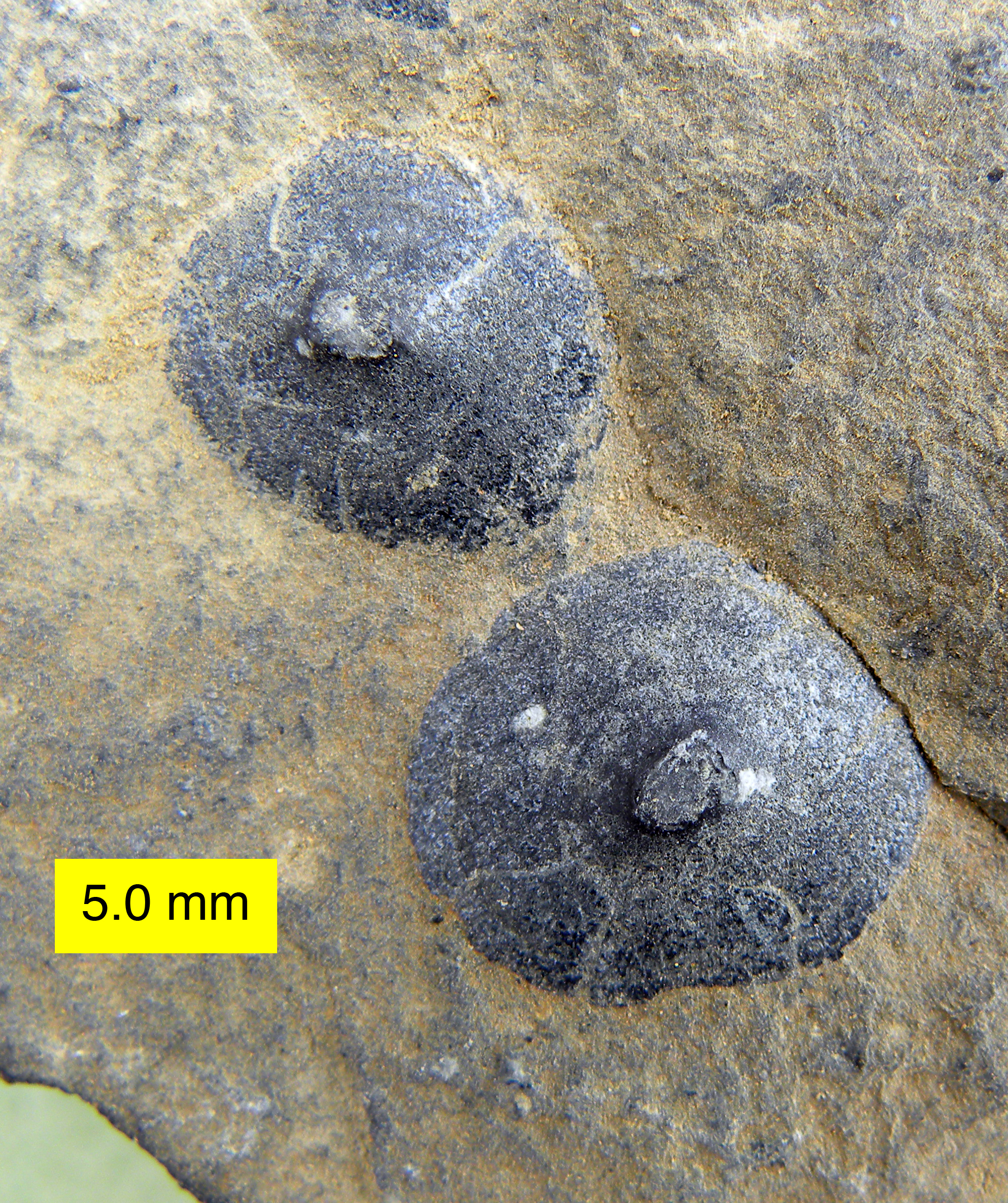
- Fossils of the Cambrian mollusc Scenella
  †Scenella
  - †Scenella compressa
  - †Scenella obtusa
- †Sceptaspis
  - †Sceptaspis lincolnensis
- †Schizambon
- †Schizocrania
  - †Schizocrania filosa
- †Schmidtella
  - †Schmidtella affinis
  - †Schmidtella brevis
  - †Schmidtella lacunosa
- †Schuchertia
- †Schuchertoceras
  - †Schuchertoceras thomasi
- †Scofieldia
  - †Scofieldia bilateralis
- †Scofieldoceras
  - †Scofieldoceras depressum
  - †Scofieldoceras shumardi
- †Scyphiodus
  - †Scyphiodus primus
- †Similodonta
- †Simulites
  - †Simulites concinnus
- †Sinuites
  - †Sinuites cancellatus
  - †Sinuites pervoluta
  - †Sinuites rectangularis
  - †Sinuites subcompressa – type locality for species
- †Sivertsia
- †Skenidioides
  - †Skenidioides anthonense
- †Sowerbyella
  - †Sowerbyella curdsvillensis
  - †Sowerbyella minnesotensis
- †Spatiopora
  - †Spatiopora lineata
- †Sphenolium
- †Sphenosphaera
  - †Sphenosphaera platystoma
  - †Sphenosphaera rogersensis
- †Spyroceras
  - †Spyroceras cylindratum
  - †Spyroceras lesueuri
  - †Spyroceras perroti – or unidentified comparable form
  - †Spyroceras scofieldi
- †Staufferella
  - †Staufferella falcata
- †Staufferoceras
  - †Staufferoceras featherstonhaughi
- †Stereoconus
  - †Stereoconus gracilis
- †Stictopora
  - †Stictopora dumosa
  - †Stictopora exigua
  - †Stictopora lita
  - †Stictopora minima
  - †Stictopora mutabilis
  - †Stictopora neglecta – or unidentified comparable form
  - †Stictopora paupera
- †Stictoporella
  - †Stictoporella angularis
  - †Stictoporella cribrosa
  - †Stictoporella frondifera
  - †Stictoporella gracilis
- †Stigmacephalus
  - †Stigmacephalus flexifrons
- †Stigmaspis
  - †Stigmaspis hudsonensis
- †Stigmatella
  - †Stigmatella claviformis
- †Strepsodiscus
  - †Strepsodiscus franconiensis – type locality for species
  - †Strepsodiscus strongi
- †Streptelasma
  - †Streptelasma corniculum
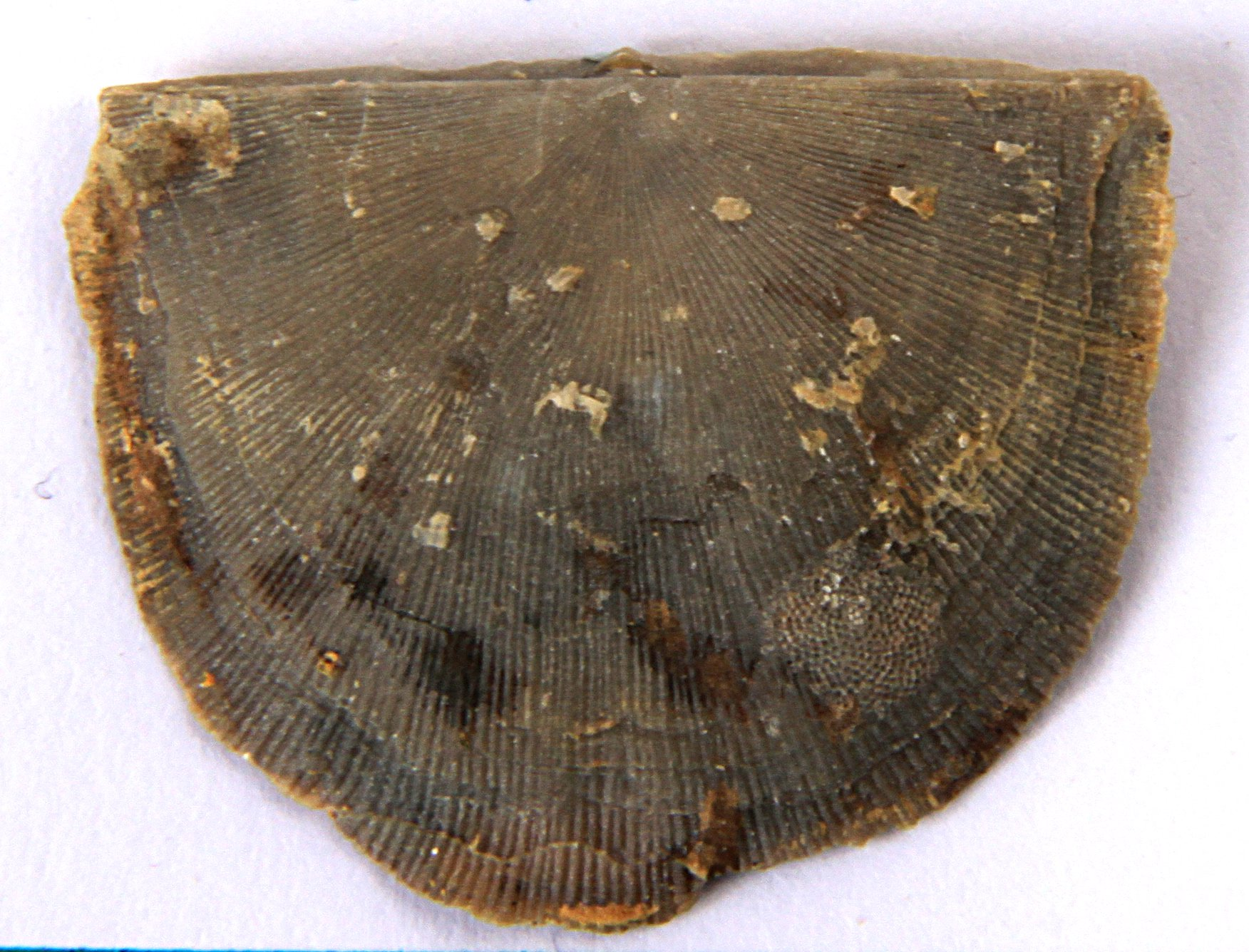
- Fossilized shell of the Ordovician-Silurian brachiopod Strophomena
  †Strophomena
  - †Strophomena billingsi
  - †Strophomena filitexta
  - †Strophomena incurvata
  - †Strophomena occidentalis
  - †Strophomena planodorsata
  - †Strophomena plattinensis – or unidentified comparable form
  - †Strophomena septata
  - †Strophomena trilobata
  - †Strophomena trilobita
- †Stylocyrtoceras
  - †Stylocyrtoceras tantillum – type locality for species
- †Subulites
  - †Subulites conradi
  - †Subulites dixonenesis
  - †Subulites elongatus
  - †Subulites pergracilis
  - †Subulites regularis
- †Sygcaulocrinus
  - †Sygcaulocrinus typus –

== T ==
- †Tanaocystis
- †Tancrediopsis
- †Technophorus
  - †Technophorus divaricatus
- †Teichertoceras
  - †Teichertoceras husseyi – or unidentified comparable form
- †Tetradella
  - †Tetradella ellipsilira
  - †Tetradella subquadrans
  - †Tetradella ulrichi
- †Tetranota
  - †Tetranota bidorsata
  - †Tetranota macra
  - †Tetranota obsoleta
  - †Tetranota sexcarinata
  - †Tetranota wisconsinensis
- †Tetraprioniodus
  - †Tetraprioniodus breviconus
- †Thaleops
  - †Thaleops ovata
- †Thomasatia
  - †Thomasatia falcicosta
- †Thuroholia
  - †Thuroholia cribriformis
  - †Thuroholia croneisi
- †Traskocrinus
  - †Traskocrinus mahlburgi
- †Trematis
  - †Trematis huronensis
- †Trematopora
  - †Trematopora primigenia
- †Trichinocrinus – or unidentified related form
- †Triconodella
  - †Triconodella flexa
- †Trigrammaria
  - †Trigrammaria winchelli
- †Tripteroceras
  - †Tripteroceras oweni
  - †Tripteroceras planoconvexum
  - †Tripteroceras scofieldi
- †Trochonema
  - †Trochonema altum
  - †Trochonema beachi
  - †Trochonema beloitense
  - †Trochonema fragile
  - †Trochonema retrorsum
  - †Trochonema rugosa
  - †Trochonema subcrassum
  - †Trochonema umbilicata
  - †Trochonema vagrans
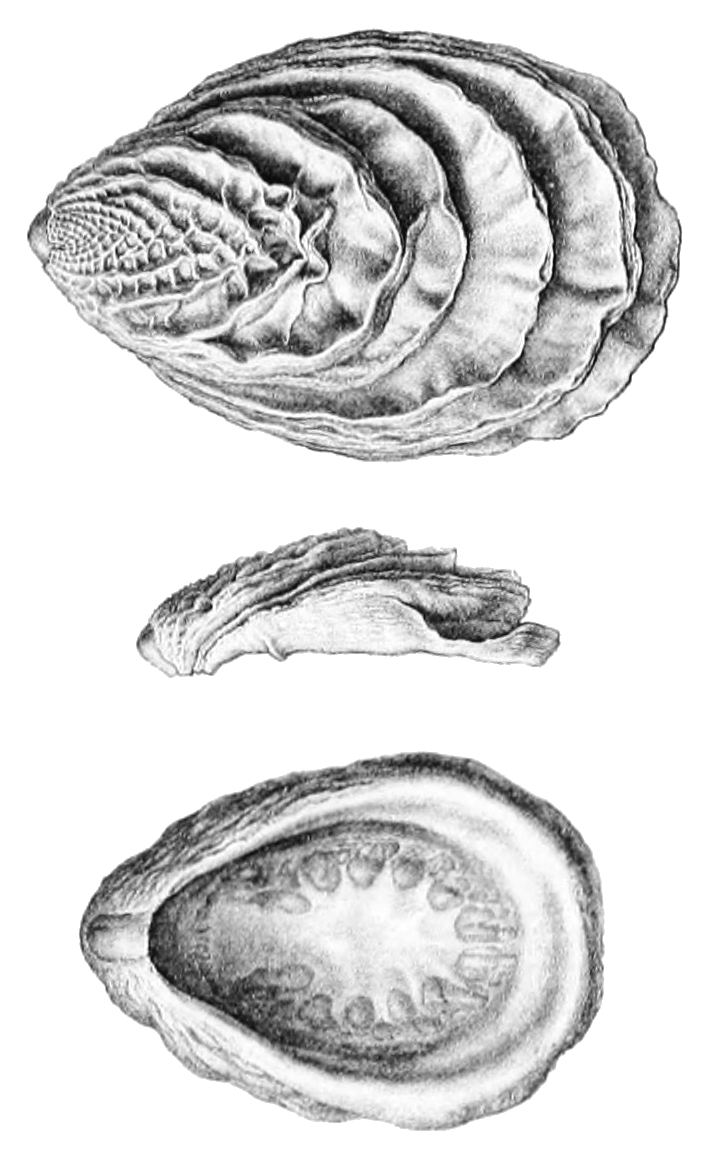
- Illustration of a fossilized shell in multiple views of the Silurian monoplacophoran mollusc Tryblidium reticulatum. Head region is to the left.
  †Tryblidium
  - †Tryblidium exserta –

== U ==
- †Ulrichaster –
  - †Ulrichaster ulrichi
- †Ulrichia
  - †Ulrichia saccula
- †Ulrichoceras
  - †Ulrichoceras beloitense
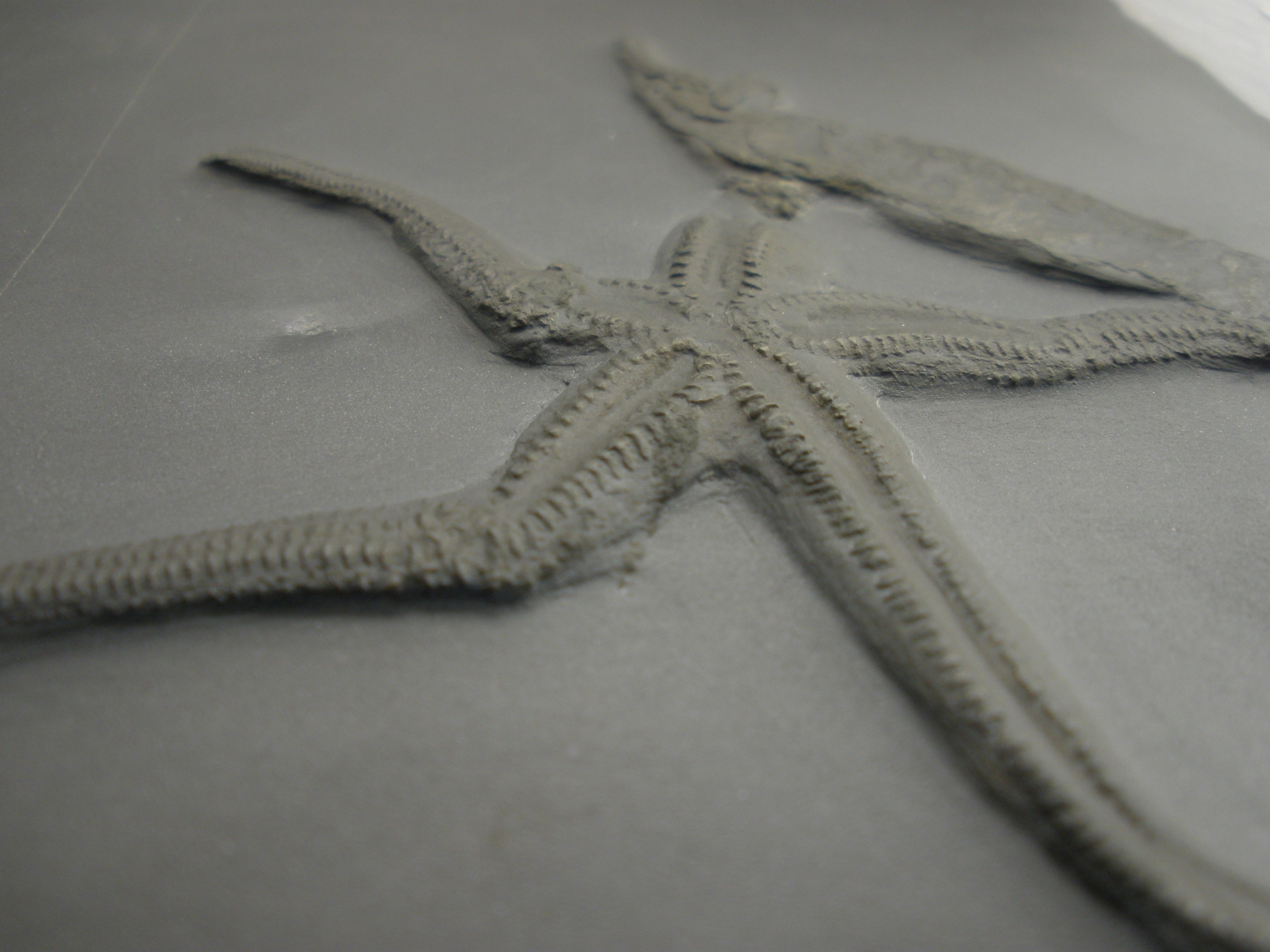
- Fossil of the Ordovician-Devonian sea star Urasterella
  †Urasterella
- †Valcouroceras
- †Vanuxemia
  - †Vanuxemia dixonensis
- †Vellamo
  - †Vellamo americana –

== W ==
- †Westonoceras
  - †Westonoceras iowense
  - †Westonoceras minnesotense
- †Whiteavesia
- †Whiteavesites
- †Whitfieldoceras
  - †Whitfieldoceras clarkei
  - †Whitfieldoceras exiguum – or unidentified comparable form
  - †Whitfieldoceras minimum
  - †Whitfieldoceras mumiaforme
- †Wilbernia
  - †Wilbernia pero
- †Willmanocystis
  - †Willmanocystis denticulatus
- †Winchellatia
  - †Winchellatia ceratopea – type locality for species
  - †Winchellatia lansingensis
  - †Winchellatia longispina
  - †Winchellatia minnesotensis
  - †Winchellatia minnsotensis –

== Z ==
- †Zittelloceras
  - †Zittelloceras beloitense
  - †Zittelloceras brevicurvatum
  - †Zittelloceras clarkeanum
  - †Zittelloceras percurvatum
  - †Zittelloceras scofieldi
  - †Zittelloceras tenuistriatum
- †Zygobolboides
  - †Zygobolboides calvini
  - †Zygobolboides grafensis
  - †Zygobolboides iowensis
  - †Zygobolboides thomasi
- †Zygospira
  - †Zygospira lebanonensis
  - †Zygospira modesta
  - †Zygospira plinthii – type locality for species
  - †Zygospira uphami
