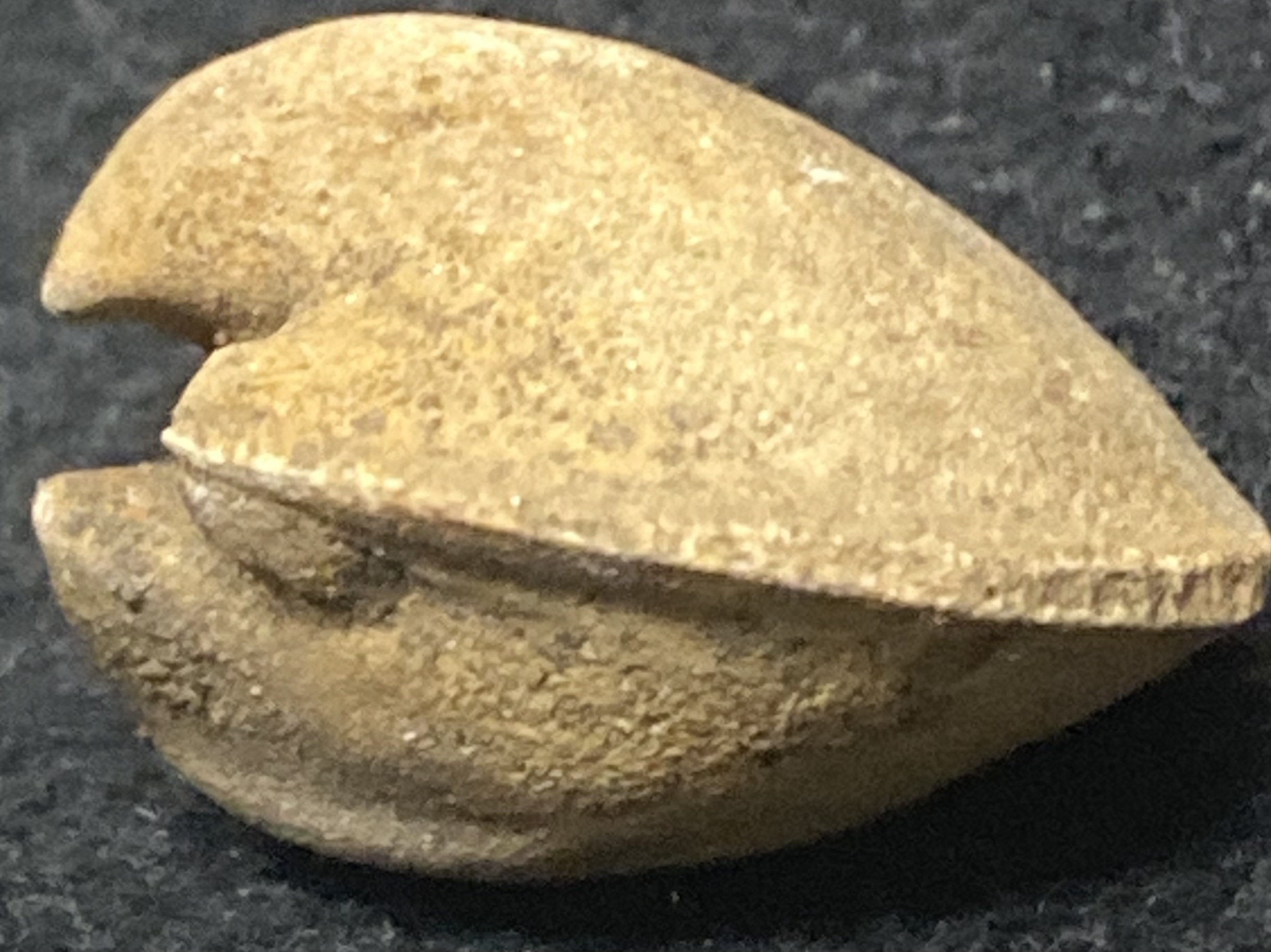
- Saffordia sp. from Mount Horeb, Wisconsin

Scientific classification
- Kingdom: Animalia
- Phylum: Mollusca
- Class: Bivalvia
- Subterclass: Euheterodonta
- Superorder: Imparidentia
- Order: †Modiomorphida; Newell 1969

Families
- †Modiomorphidae; †Myoconchidae

Synonyms
- Modiomorphoida

= Modiomorphida =

Extinct order of bivalves

Modiomorphida is an extinct order of fossil saltwater clams, marine bivalve molluscs.

== Genera ==
- †Ananterodonta
- †Brahcylyrodesma
- †Carminodonta
- †Celtoconcha
- †Cycloconchacea
- †Dulcineaia
- †Eurymya
- †Fortowensia
- †Goniophora
- †Junjagiana
- †Modiomorphoidea
- †Moridunia
- †Neofordilla
- †Plicatomorpha
- †Rimmyjmima
- †Saffordia
- †Tromelinodonta
- †Whiteavesia
