= Whiteavesia =

Whiteavesia Temporal range: Late Ordovician

Scientific classification
- Domain: Eukaryota
- Kingdom: Animalia
- Phylum: Mollusca
- Class: Bivalvia
- Order: †Modiomorphida
- Family: †Modiomorphidae
- Genus: †Whiteavesia; Ulrich, 1893

Extinct genus of bivalves

Whiteavesia is an extinct genus of fossil bivalve mollusks from the Late Ordovician of North and South America.
