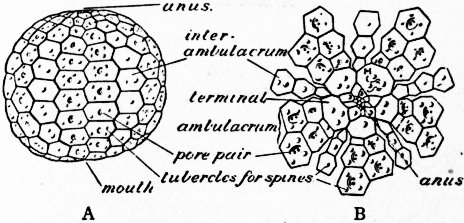
- Bothriocidaris globulus from the Encyclopædia Britannica, 1911. The short spines which were attached to the tubercles are not drawn.

Scientific classification
- Kingdom: Animalia
- Phylum: Echinodermata
- Class: Echinoidea
- Order: †Bothriocidaroida
- Family: †Bothriocidaridae
- Genus: †Bothriocidaris; Eichwald, 1860

= Bothriocidaris =

Bothriocidaris Temporal range: Ordovician

Extinct genus of sea urchins

Bothriocidaris is an extinct genus of echinoid from the Ordovician. It grew to 1.6 centimetres (0.63 in) in size and fed on plankton.
