= Goniophora =

Goniophora Temporal range: Ordovician–Permian

Scientific classification
- Kingdom: Animalia
- Phylum: Mollusca
- Class: Bivalvia
- Order: †Modiomorphida
- Family: †Modiomorphidae
- Subfamily: †Modiomorphinae
- Genus: †Goniophora; Phillips, 1848

Genus of molluscs (fossil)

Goniophora is an extinct genus of clams. It lived during the Ordovician to Permian periods.

== Description ==
Goniophora has a sharply angular, distinctive shell with a prominent ridge extending the length of the shell. The shell also has fine growth lines.
