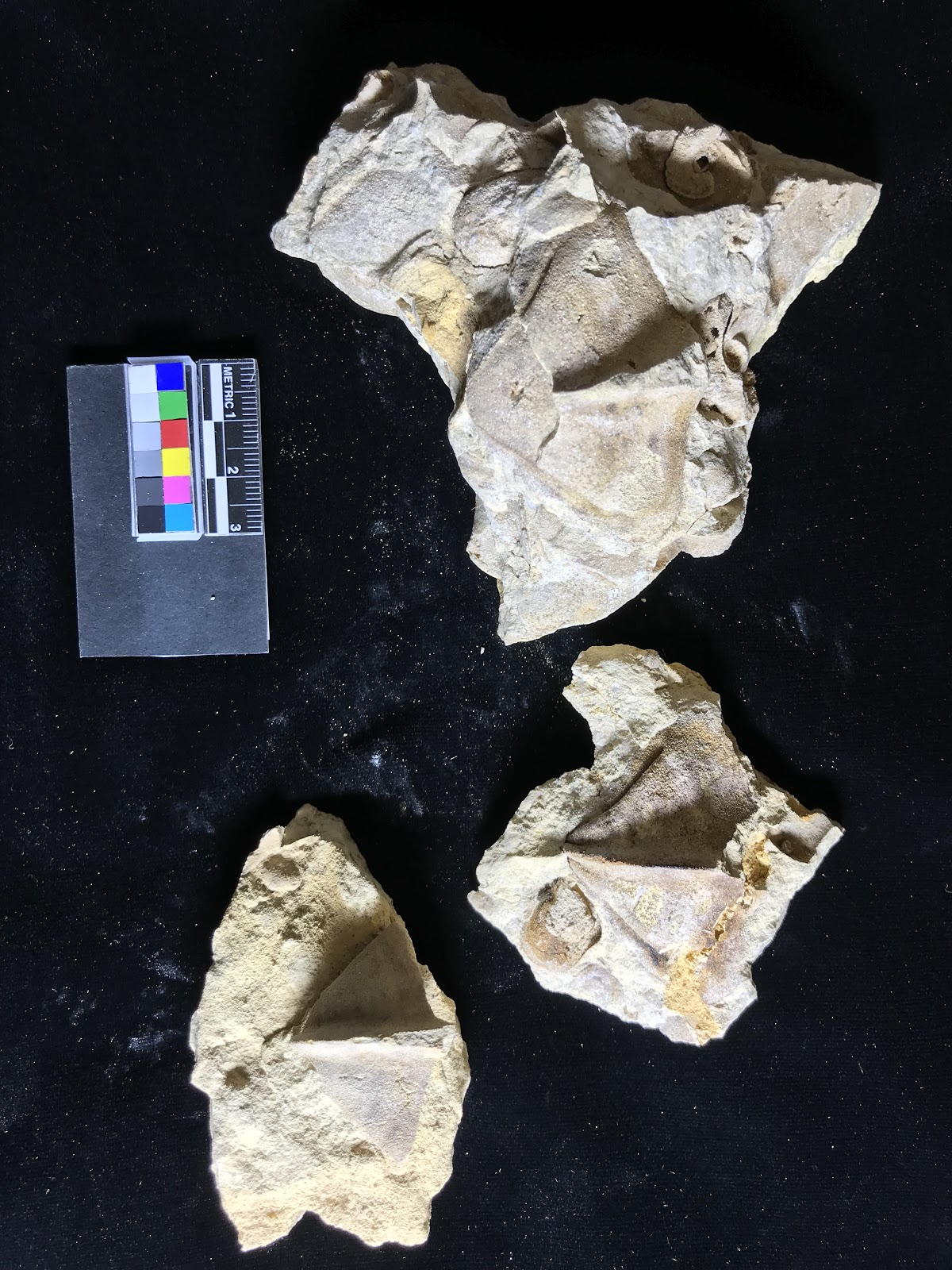
- Pterotheca attenuata from the Milwaukee Public Museum

Scientific classification
- Domain: Eukaryota
- Kingdom: Animalia
- Phylum: Mollusca
- Class: Monoplacophora
- Genus: †Pterotheca
- Species: †P. attenuata

Binomial name
- †Pterotheca attenuata (Ulrich 1895)

= Pterotheca attenuata =

Pterotheca attenuata Temporal range: Early-Late Ordovician ~480–450 Ma

Ordovician fossil

Pterotheca attenuata is a fossil species from the Ordovician upper Midwestern United States. It has been variously classified as a monoplacophoran, bellerophont, or another type of gastropod.

Remains of the animal were found in deposits laid down in shallow marine waters, as the Decorah Shale and Platteville Limestone of the United States Midwest. It is often misclassified in museum collections because of its unusual morphology and therefore documentation of its range and abundance is poor.

== Preservation and morphology ==
The shell is composed of two slightly concave sub-triangular layers that connect along the anterior most side. The dorsal layer has a ridge that extends perpendicularly from the rest of shell along the median plane. The underside of the ventral most layer is effaced and smooth, but the top of the ventral layer and the bottom of the dorsal layer both show a slight medial ridge.

P. attenuata is most often preserved in fine-grained sedimentary rock like shale and limestone, but its range likely extends outside of these facies. The shell is often found broken and the two layers separated. P. attenuata's unusual shape and the fragmentary nature of many of its fossils are both causes of its frequent misclassification as a brachiopod.
