= Dvorakia =

Scientific classification
- Kingdom: Plantae
- Clade: Tracheophytes
- Clade: Angiosperms
- Clade: Eudicots
- Clade: Rosids
- Order: Brassicales
- Family: Brassicaceae
- Tribe: Anchonieae
- Genus: Dvorakia; D.A.German

Species
- Dvorakia alaica (Korsh.) D.A.German; Dvorakia alyssifolia (DC.) D.A.German

Genus of flowering plants

Dvorakia is a genus of flowering plants in the family Brassicaceae. It includes two species native to Afghanistan, Central Asia, Iran, and Jordan.

- Dvorakia alaica (Korsh.) D.A.German – Kyrgyzstan and Uzbekistan
- Dvorakia alyssifolia (DC.) D.A.German – Afghanistan, Iran, Jordan, and Turkmenistan
