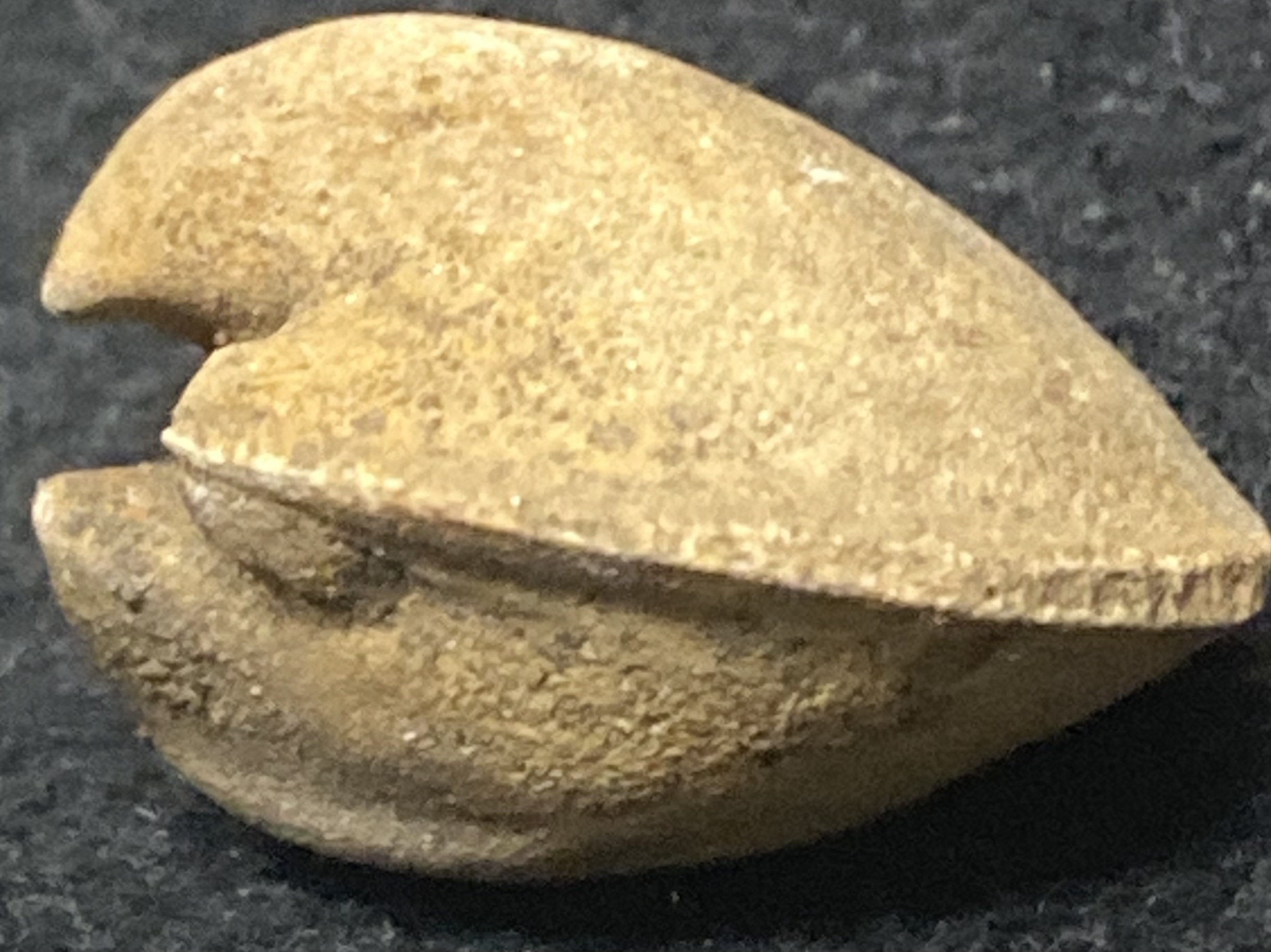
- Saffordia sp. from Mount Horeb, Wisconsin

Scientific classification
- Domain: Eukaryota
- Kingdom: Animalia
- Phylum: Mollusca
- Class: Bivalvia
- Order: †Modiomorphida
- Family: †Modiomorphidae
- Genus: †Saffordia; Ulrich, 1894
- Species: †S. ventralis

Binomial name
- †Saffordia ventralis Ulrich, 1894

= Saffordia =

Saffordia Temporal range: Darriwilian–Sandbian

Ordovician bivalve genus

Saffordia is an extinct genus of bivalve mollusc of the order Modiomorphida. It lived during the middle to late Ordovician. Based on other members of it family, this clam was a stationary epifaunal suspension feeder. Its only species is Saffordia ventralis, which features a prominent escutcheon and is similar to – possibly synonymous with – Heikea. The clam can be distinguished from others due to its parallel shell haves with noticeable notches at the end.
