= Maelonoceras =

Maelonoceras Temporal range: Ordovician - Silurian

Scientific classification
- Kingdom: Animalia
- Phylum: Mollusca
- Class: Cephalopoda
- Subclass: Nautiloidea
- Order: †Oncocerida
- Genus: †Maelonoceras; Hyatt 1884

Extinct genus of nautiloids

Maelonoceras is a Late Ordovician - early Silurian oncocerid found in Ontario.

== Description ==
The shell is a faintly gibbous exogastric cyrtocone with subparallel dorsal and ventral profiles but adorally converging sides. The aperture visored, pear-shaped. The Siphuncle small, ventral.

== Taxonomic relation ==
Maelonoceras is nautiloid cephalopod included in the Oncoceratidae along with such genera as Oncoceras, Belotoceras, Digenuoceras, and Maimoceras.
