= Blakeoceras =

Blakeoceras Temporal range: Silurian -M Devonian

Scientific classification
- Domain: Eukaryota
- Kingdom: Animalia
- Phylum: Mollusca
- Class: Cephalopoda
- Subclass: Nautiloidea
- Order: †Oncocerida
- Family: †Nothoceratidae
- Genus: †Blakeoceras; Foeste, 1926

Blakeoceras is a nautiloid cephalopod from the Oncocerida family Nothoceratidae with a curved shell that lived in shallow seas from the Silurian to the Middle Devonian in what has become Europe.

The shell of Blakeoceras is moderately curved (cyrtoconic) with the ventral side on the outer curvature (exogastric) Chambers in the phragmocone are short and wide, separated by straight, close spaced septa. Body chamber short. Siphuncle ventro-marginal, with internal, radial actinosiphonate deposits and concave segments.

Blakeocers is similar to Perimecoceras in general form, but is more broadly expanded and has a proportionally shorter body chamber. Conostichoceras is less strongly curved and widens more laterally. Turnoceras is more strongly curved and has a much greater expansion. Conostichoceras and Turnoceras are also more breviconic (shorter).

Blakeoceras is an early nothoceratid possibly derived from Perimecoceras which has its origin in the Oncoceratidae, and is the likely source for the other exogastric nothoceratids with more greatly expanded shells.

Blakeoceras was probably a bottom-feeder, based on its shell, that spent time, prowling, head down, over the sea floor.
