= Hipparionoceras =

Hipparionoceras Temporal range: Middle Devonian

Scientific classification
- Domain: Eukaryota
- Kingdom: Animalia
- Phylum: Mollusca
- Class: Cephalopoda
- Subclass: Nautiloidea
- Order: †Oncocerida
- Family: †Polyelasmoceratidae
- Genus: †Hipparionoceras; Flower, 1945

Extinct genus of molluscs

Hipparionoceras is a genus of oncocerids from the middle Devonian of Europe, North America, and China that lived around 395 million years ago.

The shell of Hipparionoceras is curved, rapidly expanding, flared toward the aperture. The curvature is endogastric with the ventral side somewhat concave in profile. The siphuncle is subventral, empty, with segments expanded into the short but broad chambers. Septa are close spaced, their curvature shallow.

Polyelasmoceras and Macrodomoceras are related genera, also from the Middle Devonian. Cadoceras from the Middle Silurian may be ancestral.
