= Osbornoceras =

Osbornoceras Temporal range: Lower Silurian

Scientific classification
- Kingdom: Animalia
- Phylum: Mollusca
- Class: Cephalopoda
- Subclass: Nautiloidea
- Order: †Oncocerida
- Family: †Karoceratidae
- Genus: †Osbornoceras; Foeste, 1936

Extinct genus of molluscs

Osbornoceras is a genus of Lower Silurian cyrtoconic nautiloid cephalopods known from Ohio and possibly Manitoba, one of five general currently included in the oncocerid family Karoceratidae.

== Diagnosis -morphology ==
Osbornoceras grew to be somewhat large and is characterized by a narrow, compressed, strongly curved, exograstric shell. The venter, on the outside curvature, is narrowly rounded while the dorsum, on the opposite inside curvature, is more broadly rounded. The body chamber narrows toward the aperture, which has a deep hypomomic sinus.

The siphuncle of Osbornoceras is ventral but not in contact with the ventral wall of the shell. Segments are empty and expanded ventrally but are virtually straight dorsally. Connecting rings are thin, septal necks cyrtochoanitic (outwardly flared).

== Similar genera ==
Karoceras, from Europe and Russia, which followed in the Middle Silurian, is similar in overall form but is actinosiphonate. Its siphuncle in contrast contains blade-like deposits which project radially inward. Also similar is the closely related Lower Devonian Ankyloceras and earlier Middle and/or Upper Ordovician oncoceratids such as Diagenoceras and Richardsonoceras.

== Paleoecology ==
Osbornoceras and similar oncocerids were probably benthic predators that lived on the seafloor oriented in life as to face forward with the body chamber parallel to the seafloor and curved phragmocone arched upward. Whether they were pursuit of ambush predators is unknown. Also unknown is the number of arms. Was it the primitive 8 or 10 or the derived 90 plus found in recent Nautilidae.
