= Perimecoceras =

Perimecoceras Temporal range: U Silurian

Scientific classification
- Domain: Eukaryota
- Kingdom: Animalia
- Phylum: Mollusca
- Class: Cephalopoda
- Subclass: Nautiloidea
- Order: †Oncocerida
- Family: †Nothoceratidae
- Genus: †Perimecoceras; Foeste, 1926

Extinct genus of molluscs

Perimecoceras is a genus of nothoceratids, nautilitoids in the order Oncocerida, with a slowly expanding, compressed, cyrtoconic shell, known from the Upper Silurian of central Europe.

Perimecoceras is similar in general form to the oncoceratid genus Oonoceras from which it may have been derived, but differs in having a longer body chamber in proportion and in having concave segments to its siphuncle. It as also the most likely ancestral nothoceratid, probably giving rise to Blakeoceras and other Nothoceratidae.

Perimecoceras probably lived on the sea floor, body chamber horizontal, phragmocone behind arched upward away from the bottom, using a combination of crawling and jet-swimming as it moved about.
