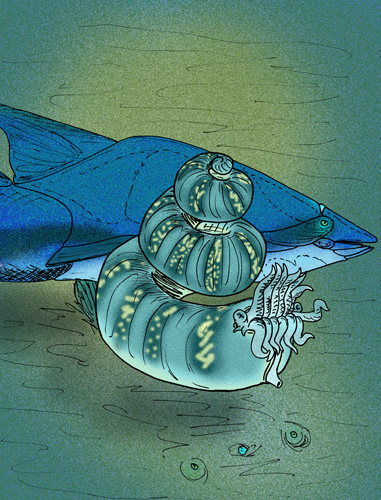
- Reconstruction of L. lorieri

Scientific classification
- Kingdom: Animalia
- Phylum: Mollusca
- Class: Cephalopoda
- Subclass: Nautiloidea
- Order: †Oncocerida
- Family: †Nothoceratidae
- Genus: †Lorieroceras; Foeste, 1926
- Species: †L. lorieri

Binomial name
- †Lorieroceras lorieri (Barrande, 1870)

Synonyms
- Trochoceras lorieri Barrande, 1870

= Lorieroceras =

Lorieroceras Temporal range: Lochkovian-Pragian

Extinct genus of cephalopods

Lorieroceras lorieri is an extinct oncocerid nautilitoidean cephalopod belonging to the family Nothoceratidae. Fossils are found in Lower Devonian marine strata of France. Its shell is unusual among nautiloids in that it is a loosely coiled, turban-shaped helix that is sinistrally coiled.
