= Laumontoceras =

Scientific classification
- Domain: Eukaryota
- Kingdom: Animalia
- Phylum: Mollusca
- Class: Cephalopoda
- Subclass: Nautiloidea
- Order: †Oncocerida
- Family: †Jovellaniidae
- Genus: †Laumontoceras; Foerste, 1926

Genus of nautiloids

Laumonttoceras is a genus in oncocerid family Jovellaniidae from the lower Devonian of Europe characterized by uncompressed, moderately expanding, orthocones with a central siphuncle composed of cylindrical segments that are slightly contracted at the septal openings and which contain discrete, discontinuous actinosiphonate deposits.

Laumontoceras differs from Jovellania, also from the lower Devonian of Europe, primarily in having a central rather than a subventral siphuncle, as in Jovellania.
