= Minganoceras =

Scientific classification
- Domain: Eukaryota
- Kingdom: Animalia
- Phylum: Mollusca
- Class: Cephalopoda
- Subclass: Nautiloidea
- Order: †Oncocerida
- Family: †Valcouroceratidae
- Genus: †Minganoceras; Foeste, 1938

Extinct genus of molluscs

Minganoceras is a genus in the oncocerid family, Valcouroceratidae, named by Foeste, 1938, from the Middle Ordovician of Quebec, found on Mingan Island.

The shell of Minganoceras is a slender depressed exogastric cyrtocone, curved so that the underside, the venter, is longitudinally convex and the opposite side, the dorsum, is longitudinally concave. The venter is more narrowly rounded in section than the dorsum, a common feature of exogastric forms, including Bassleroceras and developed to a greater extreme in Kindleoceras. The siphuncle is cyrochoanitic with simple actinosiphonate deposits.
