= Ankyloceras =

Ankyloceras Temporal range: Lower Devonian

Scientific classification
- Kingdom: Animalia
- Phylum: Mollusca
- Class: Cephalopoda
- Subclass: Nautiloidea
- Order: Nautilida
- Genus: †Ankyloceras; Zhuravleva, 1974

Extinct genus of molluscs

Ankyloceras is a genus of Early Devonian cephalopods included in the oncocerid family Karoceratidae. The type species, Ankyloceras nesnayamiense named by Zhuravleva, 1974, comes from Nova Zemlya in Russia. Other species have been found in Japan, Morocco, and Russia.

== Morphology ==
The shell of Ankyloceras is cyrtoconic, exogastrically curved with a compressed to slightly depressed elliptical cross section more narrowly rounded ventrally than dorsally. Sutures form broad lateral lobes. The Siphuncle is marginal to the convex (ventral) side of shell. Septal necks in the type species are loxochoanitic, (inwardly slanting to the siphuncle) on marginal side, short recumbent on side facing interior. Connecting rings are expanded ventrally at the adapical end of each segment and dorsally at the adoral end.

== Similar and related genera ==
Ankyloceras is similar in overall form to the earlier Osbornoceras from North America, except for the details of the siphuncle. Similar too are the oncoceratid Diagenoceras and Dunleithoceras, among others, from the latter part of the Ordovician.
