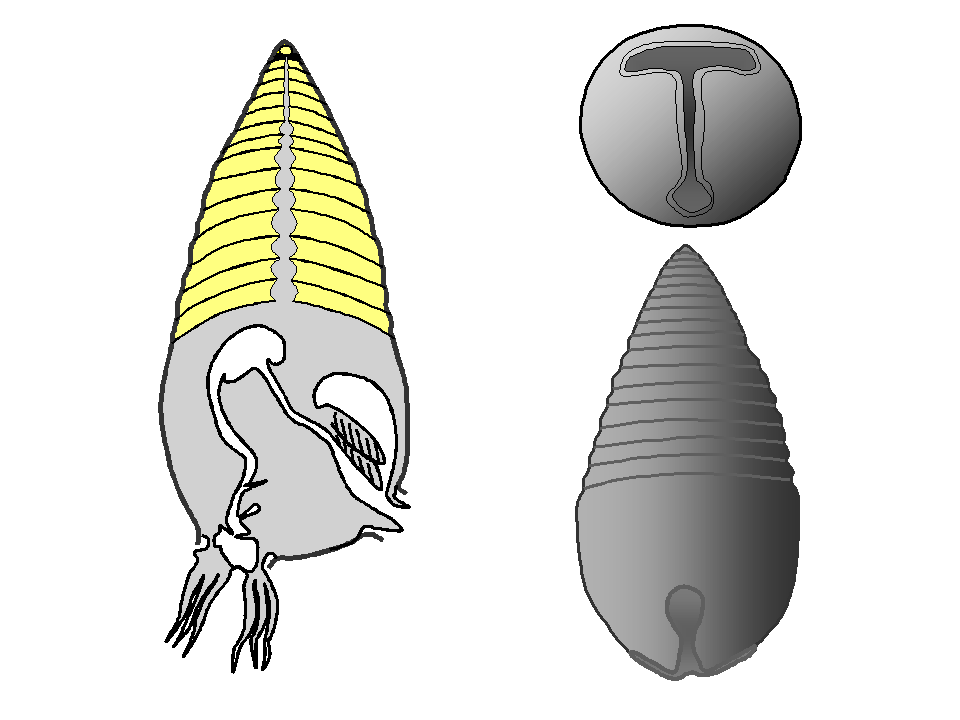

Scientific classification
- Kingdom: Animalia
- Phylum: Mollusca
- Class: Cephalopoda
- Subclass: Nautiloidea
- Order: †Oncocerida
- Genus: †Gomphoceras; Sowerby, 1839

= Gomphoceras =

Gomphoceras Temporal range: Middle Silurian

Gomphoceras is a questionable nautiloid cephalopod genus assigned to the Oncocerida. The family to which it might belong is undetermined.

Gomphoceras, named by Sowerby in 1839, is generally short but rapidly expanding, straight to slightly endogastric, with a gibbous body chamber such that all sides are convex. The aperture as vertically transverse, with a hyponomic sinus on a low spout-like process and a larger rounded dorsal sinus connetected above.

Tetrameroceras and Trimeroceras, both oncocerids, are similar in general form, but have more complex apertures.
