= Hexameroceras =

Hexameroceras Temporal range: Late Silurian

Scientific classification
- Kingdom: Animalia
- Phylum: Mollusca
- Class: Cephalopoda
- Subclass: Nautiloidea
- Order: †Oncocerida
- Family: †Hemiphragmoceratidae
- Genus: †Hexameroceras; Hyatt, 1884

Species
- See text

Extinct genus of molluscs

Hexameroceras is a genus of nautiloid cephalopods belonging to the order Oncocerida that lived during the middle and late Silurian. Its fossils have been found in North America in Indiana, New York, Ohio, and Wisconsin, and in Europe in the Czech Republic (Czech Republik according to TUREK, 2009).

Hexameroceras is similar to Tetrameroceras but has 3 pairs of dorsolateral sinuses (lateral embayments in the aperture) and narrow mid-dorsal projection or salient. The shell, as for the family, is breviconic, i.e. short, curved toward the apex, straight toward the aperture. The siphuncle is ventral, nummuloidal and contains inwardly radial actinosiphonate deposits.
