= Valcouroceras =

Scientific classification
- Domain: Eukaryota
- Kingdom: Animalia
- Phylum: Mollusca
- Class: Cephalopoda
- Subclass: Nautiloidea
- Order: †Oncocerida
- Family: †Valcouroceratidae
- Genus: †Valcouroceras; Flower, 1843

Genus of molluscs

Valcouroceras is the type genus for the Valcouroceratidae, a family in the nautiloid order Oncocerida named by Rousseau Flower, 1943, named for Valcour Island in Lake Champlain, between New York state and Vermont, where it was first discovered.

The shell of Valcouroceras is strongly curved, more so than in Minganoceras, with the lower or ventral side on the outside curve. The body, or living, chamber is gibbous, broader near the middle than at the ends. The early growth stage is laterally compressed, higher than wide, then dorsally flattened, and finally depressed, wider than high. Septal necks of the siphuncle are straight, suborthochoanitic, nearly reaching he previous septa. Connecting rings start off thin but thicken in the later growth stages, which have well-developed, internal radial, actinosiphonate deposits.
