= Codoceras =

Codoceras Temporal range: Middle Silurian

Scientific classification
- Kingdom: Animalia
- Phylum: Mollusca
- Class: Cephalopoda
- Subclass: Nautiloidea
- Order: †Oncocerida
- Family: †Polyelasmoceratidae
- Genus: †Codoceras; Hyatt in Zittel, 1900

Extinct genus of molluscs

Codoceras is a genus of nautiloids belonging to the Polyelasmoceratidae, an Oncocerida family.

Codoceras, known from the Silurian of Europe, has a compressed, rapidly enlarging shell, curved endogastrically such that the presumed ventral side is concave and the opposite dorsal side is convex. The siphuncle is displaced from the center slightly toward the venter. Early segments are cylindrical. Later ones are nummuloidal and broader.

The type species is Cyrtoceras indominum Barrande 1866. Danaoceras is closely related and its most likely ancestor.
