= Lawrenceoceras =

Lawrenceoceras Temporal range: Early Ordovician

Scientific classification
- Kingdom: Animalia
- Phylum: Mollusca
- Class: Cephalopoda
- Subclass: Nautiloidea
- Order: †Ellesmerocerida
- Family: †Bassleroceratidae
- Genus: †Lawrenceoceras; Ulrich et al., 1944

Extinct genus of molluscs

Lawrenceoceras is a genus of moderately curved, gently expanding bassleroceratids (Nautiloidia, Ellesmerocerida) from the Lower Ordovician of eastern North America. Septa dividing the chambers are close spaced; sutures straight, transverse; the siphuncle narrow, submarginal.

Lawrenceoceras is closely related to nautiloids such as Bassleroceras that gave rise to the Tarphycerida although it specifically may not be ancestral.
