= Projovellania =

Projovellania Temporal range: M Silurian

Scientific classification
- Domain: Eukaryota
- Kingdom: Animalia
- Phylum: Mollusca
- Class: Cephalopoda
- Subclass: Nautiloidea
- Order: †Oncocerida
- Family: †Jovellaniidae
- Genus: †Projovellania; Hyatt in Zillel, 1900

Extinct genus of nautiloids

Projovellania is an extinct nautiloid cephalopod belonging to the oncocerid family Jovellaniidae found in mid Silurian sediments in Europe. The shell is a longiconic cyrtocone, like that of Jovellania or Mixosiphonoceras, except for being compressed rather than depressed.
