= Danaoceras =

Danaoceras Temporal range: Middle Silurian

Scientific classification
- Domain: Eukaryota
- Kingdom: Animalia
- Phylum: Mollusca
- Class: Cephalopoda
- Subclass: Nautiloidea
- Order: †Oncocerida
- Family: †Polyelasmoceratidae
- Genus: †Danaoceras; Foerste, 1926

Genus of molluscs

Danaoceras is a nautiloid cephalopod from the middle Silurian of central Europe included in the oncocerid family Polyelasmoceratidae. Similar specimens from the middle Devonian of North America may belong.

Danaoceras has a laterally compressed shell curved such that the ventral or siphuncular side is longitudinally concave, i.e. is endogastric. The siphuncle, which is ventrally submarginal, contains laminar actinosiphonate deposits.

Danaoceras is the ancestral genus of the Polyelasmoceratidae and is possibly derived from either Oonoceras or Oocerina of the Oncoceratidae based on similarities of the siphuncle
