= Poterioceratidae =

Poterioceratidae Temporal range: LDevonian - L Carb (Miss)

Scientific classification
- Domain: Eukaryota
- Kingdom: Animalia
- Phylum: Mollusca
- Class: Cephalopoda
- Subclass: Nautiloidea
- Order: †Oncocerida
- Family: †Poterioceratidae; Foord, 1888

Genera
- Poterioceras; Argocheilus; Cyrtogomphus; Lysagoroceras; Mecynoceras; Welleroceras; Xenoceras

Extinct family of nautiloids

Poterioceratidae is a family of nautiloid cephalopods included in the Oncocerida that lived during the period from the Early Devonian to the Early Carboniferous (Mississippian). Members of the Poterioceratidae are distinguished by a subcircular to compressed exogastric shell (curved upwardly so as the lower side, the venter, is convex viewed from the side) that has no hyponomic sinus and a central to subcentral siphuncle composed of subquadrate to nummuloidal segments in which the septal necks are more strongly curved on the upper, or dorsal side. This is opposite from the Karoceratidae in which siphuncle segments are inflated ventrally but straight dorsally. Some poterioceratid genera have actinosiphonate structures or annular deposits within the siphuncle. In others it is empty.

The origin of the Poterioceratidae is undetermined but may have their origin in some Silurian member of the Acleistoceratidae or perhaps even in some Ordovician oncoceratid through an unknown Silurian genus.
