= Conostichoceras =

Scientific classification
- Domain: Eukaryota
- Kingdom: Animalia
- Phylum: Mollusca
- Class: Cephalopoda
- Subclass: Nautiloidea
- Order: †Oncocerida
- Family: †Nothoceratidae
- Genus: †Conostichoceras; Foerste, 1926

Extinct genus of molluscs

Conostichoceras is a genus of exogastric, breviconic oncocerids included in the family Nothoceratidae, known from the Middle Devonian of central Europe and Upper Devonian of Australia. It probably lived on and swum above the sea floor.

== Morphology ==
Conostichoceras, named by Foeste, 1926, produced a depressed exogastric breviconic shell with short, wide chambers and large living chamber, similar to Blakeoceras and Turnoceras but differing details especially of the siphuncle. The siphuncle is ventral; nummuloidal in the adapical half of the phragmocone but with concave profiles in the adoral half, and is actinosiphonate. The sides of the living chamber in the adult converge slightly on the aperture.

== Taxonomy ==
In its broader taxonomy Conostichoceras belongs to a group of nautiloid cephalopods known as the Nautilitoidea, a superorder that includes the orders Oncocerida, Tarphycerida, and Nautilida. The family Nothoceratidae to which it belongs is one of 16 included in the Oncocerida.

== See also ==
Barskov, I. S.; Boiko, M. S.; Konovalova, V. A.; Leonova, T. B.; Nikolaeva, S. V. (2008). "Cephalopods in the marine ecosystems of the Paleozoic". Paleontological Journal. 42 (11): 1167. Bibcode:2008PalJ...42.1167B. doi:10.1134/S0031030108110014. (includes limited images of fossil material)
