= Actinomorpha =

Actinomorpha Temporal range: Middle Ordovician

Scientific classification
- Domain: Eukaryota
- Kingdom: Animalia
- Phylum: Mollusca
- Class: Cephalopoda
- Subclass: Nautiloidea
- Order: †Oncocerida
- Family: †Valcouroceratidae
- Genus: †Actinomorpha; Flower, 1943
- Species: †A. pupa

Binomial name
- †Actinomorpha pupa Flower, 1943

Genus of valcouroceratids

Actinomorpha is a genus of valcouroceratid, order Oncocerida, from the Middle Ordovician of central North America (Minnesota, Wisconsin), named by Rousseau Flower, 1943. The shell is breviconic, short and laterally compressed; the venter more narrowly rounded than the dorsum, having the effect of a modest keel in horizontal orientation. The shell is gibbous adorally, such that the body chamber is widest well behind the aperture. The siphuncle is ventral, which could also be indicative of a horizontal orientation in life, with broad, slightly inflated segments and continuous, radial, actinosiphonate, deposits.

While Actinomorpha is a member of the Oncocerida; Actinoceras with its somewhat similar name belongs to the Actinocerida.
