= Macrodomoceras =

Macrodomoceras Temporal range: Middle Devonian

Scientific classification
- Kingdom: Animalia
- Phylum: Mollusca
- Class: Cephalopoda
- Subclass: Nautiloidea
- Order: †Oncocerida
- Family: †Polyelasmoceratidae
- Genus: †Macrodomoceras; Teichert & Glenister, 1952

Extinct genus of molluscs

Macrodomoceras is a genus of oncocerids, family Polyelasmoceratidae, from the Middle Devonian of Australia.

The shell of Macrodomoceras is a compressed, endogastric cyrtocone, i.e. section higher than wide and curved with the ventral side concave, with a subtriangular cross section. The siphuncle is ventral, marginal, with continuous actinosiphonate lamellae.

Macrodomoceras resembles Danaoceras in its subtriangular cross section, but its sutures have bluntly pointed ventral saddles.
