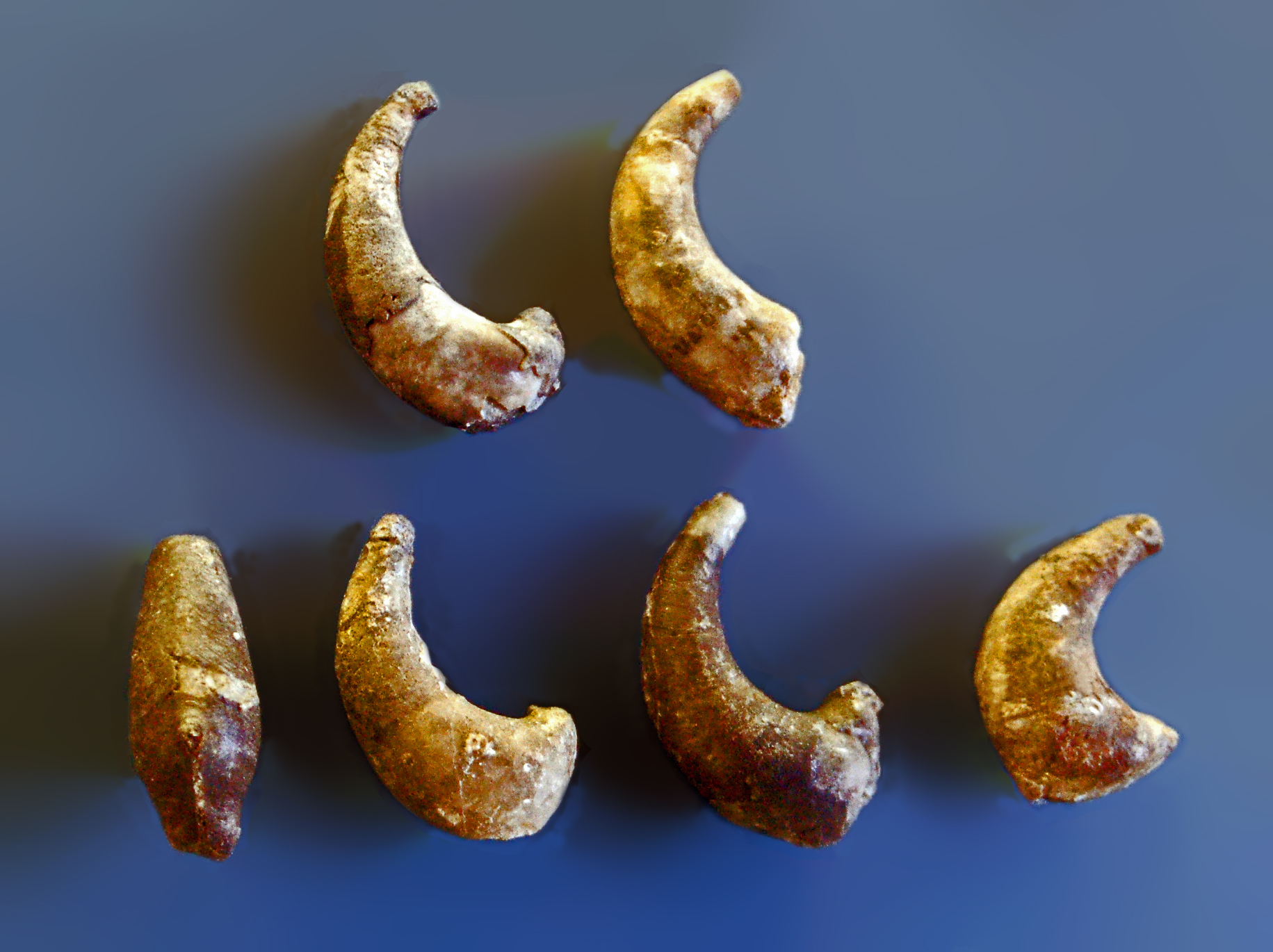
- Inversoceras perversum, Barrande from Prague Zadní Kopanina (Czech Republic) at the National Museum (Prague)

Scientific classification
- Kingdom: Animalia
- Phylum: Mollusca
- Class: Cephalopoda
- Subclass: Nautiloidea
- Order: †Oncocerida
- Family: †Trimeroceratidae
- Genus: †Inversoceras; Hedstroem 1917

= Inversoceras =

Inversoceras Temporal range: Silurian

Extinct genus of molluscs

Inversoceras is a genus of cephalopods in the order Oncocerida and the family Trimeroceratidae. These mollusks were fast-moving nektobenthic carnivores. They lived in the Silurian period, from the Lower Wenlock age (428.2 ± 1.5 to 422.9 ± 2.8 mya) to the Ludlow age (422.9 ± 1.5 to 418.7 ± 2.8 mya).

== Distribution ==
Silurian of Sweden, United States (Wisconsin).

== Species ==
- Inversoceras falciformis (Barrande 1865)
- Inversoceras percurvatum Foerste 1926
  - Inversoceras perversum eoperversum Stridsberg 1988
  - Inversoceras perversum falciformis (Barrande 1865)
  - Inversoceras perversum perversum (Barrande 1865)

== See also ==
- List of nautiloids
