= Graciloceratidae =

Graciloceratidae Temporal range: M-U Ordovician

Scientific classification
- Kingdom: Animalia
- Phylum: Mollusca
- Class: Cephalopoda
- Subclass: Nautiloidea
- Order: †Oncocerida
- Family: †Graciloceratidae; Flower 1950

Extinct family of molluscs

The Graciloceratidae is a family of nautiloid cephalopods from the Middle and Upper Ordovician belonging to the Oncocerida, characterized by exogastric cyrtocones that expand slightly or moderately and have thin walled, orthochoanitic marginal or subventral, tubular siphuncles (Sweet 1964).

The Graciloceratidae was proposed by Rousseau Flower in 1950 and at that time placed in the Basslerocerida which has since been abandoned. It is now assigned to the Oncocerida (Sweet 1964).

== Phylogeny ==
The Graciloceratidae are most likely derived from the Bassleroceratidae (Flower 1950) from which they differ primarily in having thin rather than thick connecting rings. They are also the most likely source for the Oncoceratidae, Tripteroceratidae, and Valcouroceratidae (Flower 1950).

== Included genera ==
The Graciloceratidae contains five known genera, four of which are briefly described in the Treatise Part K, Nautiloidea-Oncocerida. The fifth and last listed was named in 2009. They are as follows with their originators:

Graciloceras Flower 1943: slender, compressed, regularly expanding, body chamber much longer than phragmocone; septa very close spaced, siphuncle small, subventral; M-U Ord, NAm. (Sweet K383)

Eorizoceras Flower 1943: rapidly expanding, apically curved, adorally straight, faintly compressed with ovoid cross section; sutures straight, slightly oblique; exterior with transverse bands and fine longitudinal markings; no hyponomic sinus; siphuncle small, ventral. M Ord NAm. (Sweet K383)

Piersaloceras Teichert 1930: like Graciloceras but larger, not distinctly compressed, siphuncle well removed from venter, surface with weak longitudinal ribs crossed by thick, ripple-shaped fluttings. U Ord E Eur. (Sweet K383)

Ringoceras Strand 1934: small, strongly curved, depressed; surface with longitudinal ribs and fine, transverse striae; siphuncle subventral; U Ord N Eur. (Sweet K383)&

Kundoceras Kröger 2009: a graciloceratid from the Middle Ordovician of the Baltic region (Kröger, Zhang, and Isakar. 2009)
