= Jovellaniidae =

Jovellaniidae Temporal range: Wenlock–Upper Devonian

Scientific classification
- Kingdom: Animalia
- Phylum: Mollusca
- Class: Cephalopoda
- Subclass: Nautiloidea
- Order: †Oncocerida
- Family: †Jovellaniidae; Foord, 1888

Genera
- Bohemojovellania; Hadoceras; Herkimeroceras; Jovellania; Laumontoceras; Mixosiphonoceras; Projovellania; Rhytidoceras; Xyloceras

Extinct family of molluscs

Jovellaniidae was established as a family within the Oncocerida to include genera characterized by longiconic orthocones and cyrtocones with a subtriangular to depressed cross-section in which the ventral (siphuncular) side is typically angular or more acutely rounded than the dorsal (antisiphuncular) side, and in which the siphuncle is generally large, ventral, and with lamellar actinosiphonate deposits (Flower 1950, Sweet 1964)

Jovelaniids have a range that extends from the Middle Silurian to the Upper Ordovician and are known from North America Europe. (Sweet 1964) They are thought to be derived from the Valcouroceratidae.

Jovellaniidae was given its name by Foord in 1888; its type is the genus Jovellania
