= Clathroceras =

Clathroceras Temporal range: Silurian

Scientific classification
- Domain: Eukaryota
- Kingdom: Animalia
- Phylum: Mollusca
- Class: Cephalopoda
- Subclass: Nautiloidea
- Order: †Oncocerida
- Family: †Trimeroceratidae
- Genus: †Clathroceras; Foerste, 1926

Species
- Clathroceras plicatum Stridsberg, 1985; Clathroceras sulcatum (Barrande, 1865)

Genus of fossil molluscs

Clathroceras is an extinct genus of straight oncocerid belonging to the family Trimeroceratidae. It comprises several species, including Clathroceras plicatum and C. sulcatum.

C. plicatum was discovered in Gotland, Sweden, and C. sulcatum in the Czech Republic. The latter was originally classified as part of the distantly-related oncocerid genus Phragmoceras.
