= Turnoceras =

Turnoceras Temporal range: Devonian

Scientific classification
- Kingdom: Animalia
- Phylum: Mollusca
- Class: Cephalopoda
- Subclass: Nautiloidea
- Order: †Oncocerida
- Family: †Nothoceratidae
- Genus: †Turnoceras; Foeste, 1926

Extinct genus of molluscs

Turnoceras is a genus of Devonian cephalopods belonging to the oncocerid family Nothoceratidae. Its shell is broadly expanding and exogastrically curved such that the flattened dorsum is on longitudinally concave side. Aperture unconstricted with no hyponomic sinus for the water jet funnel. siphuncle along the outer, ventral, side, with radial, plate-like actinosiphonate deposits occupying the interior.

Conostichoceras is similar externally, but has a siphuncle with a trapezoidal aspect to its siphuncle segments. Perimecoceras has similar concave siphuncle segments but is tubular in form.
