= Fayettoceras =

Fayettoceras Temporal range: Late Ordovician

Scientific classification
- Domain: Eukaryota
- Kingdom: Animalia
- Phylum: Mollusca
- Class: Cephalopoda
- Subclass: Nautiloidea
- Order: †Oncocerida
- Family: †Valcouroceratidae
- Genus: †Fayettoceras; Foeste, 1932

Species
- See text

Extinct genus of molluscs

Fayettoceras is a genus in the nautiloid family Valcouroceratidae, part of the order Oncocerida, Fayettoceras has a shell which is a depressed cyrtocone with a ventral cyrtochoanitic siphuncle of elongated ovoid segments strongly contracted at the septal necks. The internal structure is unknown.

Fayettoceras was named by Foeste in 1932. Its fossils have been found in the Upper Ordovician of Indiana and ?Wisconsin in the United States.
