= Octamerella =

Octamerella Temporal range: M Silurian

Scientific classification
- Domain: Eukaryota
- Kingdom: Animalia
- Phylum: Mollusca
- Class: Cephalopoda
- Subclass: Nautiloidea
- Order: †Oncocerida
- Family: †Hemiphragmoceratidae
- Genus: †Octamerella; Teichert and Sweet (1962)

Octamerella is an extinct genus of prehistoric nautiloids from the oncocerid family Hemiphragmoceratidae that lived in what is now Europe and North America during the Middle Silurian.

Octamerella has a breviconic shell and a mature aperture that is contracted so as to have four pairs of dorsolateral sinuses, four on each side, and a narrow mid-dorsal salient. The two ventral-most sinus pairs are typically the largest, while the dorsal-most pair is short and wide, forming a circular opening.
