= Shuranoceras =

Scientific classification
- Domain: Eukaryota
- Kingdom: Animalia
- Phylum: Mollusca
- Class: Cephalopoda
- Subclass: Nautiloidea
- Order: †Oncocerida
- Family: †Karoceratidae
- Genus: †Shuranoceras; Barskov, 1959

Genus of molluscs

Shuranoceras is a genus in the extinct oncocerid family Karoceratidae that plied the shallow sea floor from the Early Silurian to the Early Devonian. Shuranoceras is characterized by a smooth, compressed, slowly enlarging orthoconic shell with a ventral submarginal siphuncle composed of complex segments. Shuranoceras was found in middle Silurian strata in Ferghana, central Asia.

Oncocerids (Order Oncocerida) were nautiloid cephalopods that lived during the early part of the Paleozoic Era. They are closely related to the Nautilids that include the living Nautilus, but on a different evolutionary branch.

== See also ==
- Nautiloid
  - List of nautiloids
