= Pentameroceras =

Pentameroceras Temporal range: M Silurian

Scientific classification
- Domain: Eukaryota
- Kingdom: Animalia
- Phylum: Mollusca
- Class: Cephalopoda
- Subclass: Nautiloidea
- Order: †Oncocerida
- Family: †Trimeroceratidae
- Genus: †Pentameroceras; Hyatt, 1884

Genus of nautiloids

Pentameroceras is a straight to slightly exogastric breviconic oncocerid from the middle Silurian of North America and Europe belonging to the Trimeroceratidae.

This nautiloid cephalopod produced a straight to slightly exogastric shell with a variable cross section that is generally circular, in which septa are close spaced and transverse, the body chamber is inflated. The aperture, which is constricted, consists of a narrow, vertical slit-like opening extending from the ventral hyponomic sinus to a dorsal sinus and two pairs of lateral sinuses that diverge in the upper portion. Siphuncles in the Trimeroceratidae are slender and empty.
