= Augustoceras =

Augustoceras Temporal range: Mid to Late Ordovician

Scientific classification
- Kingdom: Animalia
- Phylum: Mollusca
- Class: Cephalopoda
- Subclass: Nautiloidea
- Order: †Oncocerida
- Family: †Valcouroceratidae
- Genus: †Augustoceras; Flower, 1944

Extinct genus of molluscs

Augustoceras is a genus of nautiloid cephalopods included in the order Oncocerida and family Valcouroceratidae. It is known from the Middle and Upper Ordovician of Kentucky and Ohio in the United States.

Shells of Augustocers are slender, upwardly curved, fusiform, exogastric cyrtocones with subtriangular cross-sections, short chambers, oblique sutures, and subventral siphuncles with simple internal radial actinosiphonate deposits. Kindleoceras from the Upper Ordovician of Ontario differs in having a more triangular cross-section and more numerous actinosiphonate rays in its siphuncle.
