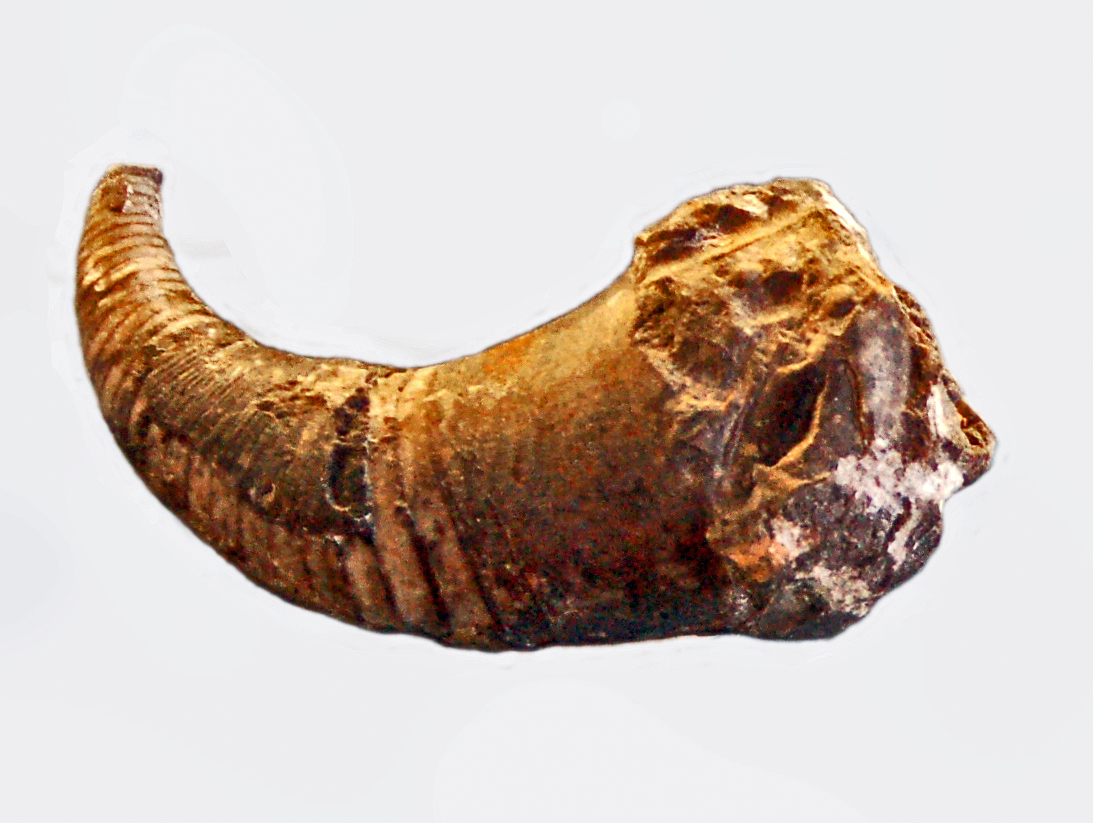
- Oonocerina plebeia, Barrande from Slivenec, Prague, (Czech Republic) at the National Museum (Prague)

Scientific classification
- Kingdom: Animalia
- Phylum: Mollusca
- Class: Cephalopoda
- Subclass: Nautiloidea
- Order: †Oncocerida
- Family: †Oncoceratidae
- Genus: †Oocerina; Foerste, 1926

= Oocerina =

Oocerina Temporal range: Silurian

Genus of molluscs

Oocerina is an extinct genus of nautiloid cephalopods that lived during the Late Silurian of Europe, Russia, and North America.

Oocerina, included in the oncoerid family Oncoceratidae and arbitrarily within the slender Oncoceratidae, is characterized by a moderately slender, elongate shell with an exogastric curvature, such that the lower side with the siphuncle is convex in profile and the opposite, upper, side is concave in profile. Shells are laterally compressed, curvature is gentle to almost straight. Chambers are short, septa close spaced, sutures typically straight. The siphuncle is nummuloidal, containing actinosiphonate deposits within.

Oonoceras is similar except for having a generally stronger curvature and a simpler, non-actinosiphonate siphuncle.

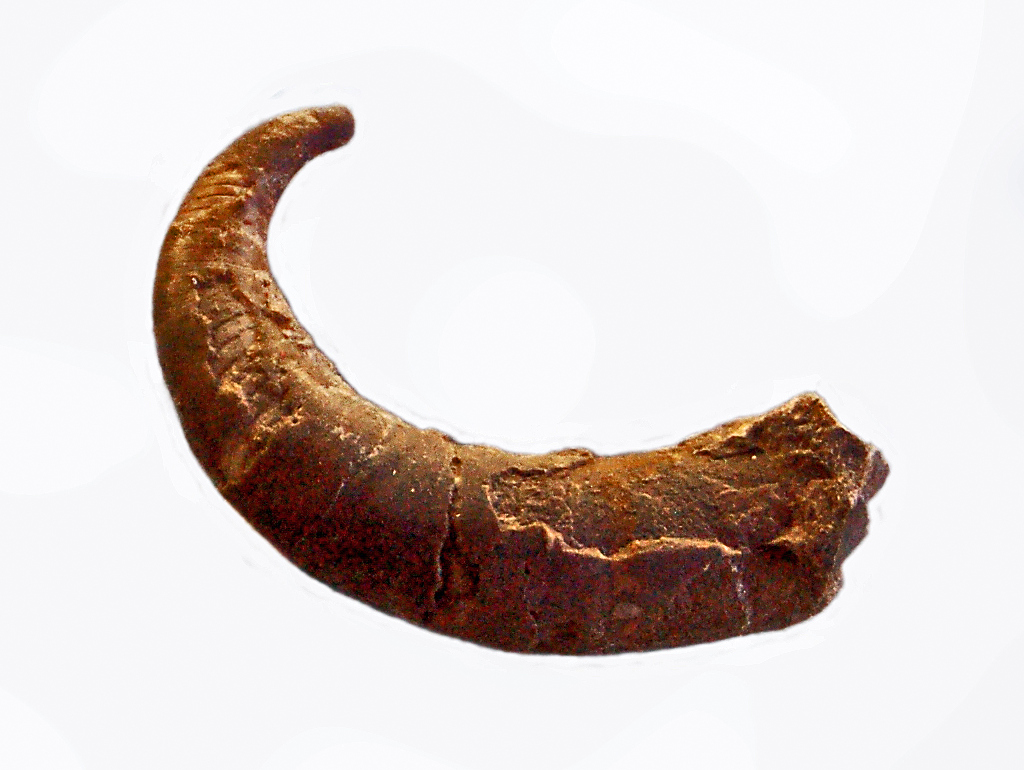
Oonocerina plebeia, Barrande from Slivenec, Prague, (Czech Republic) at the National Museum (Prague)

== Bibliography ==
- Dinosaurs to Dodos: An Encyclopedia of Extinct Animals by Don Lessem and Jan Sovak
- Walter C.Sweet, Nautiloidea-Oncocerida, in the Treatise on Invertebrate Paleontology, Part K, Teichert C and Moore R.C Eds, Geological Society of America and University of Kansas press, 1964 (K283-K290)
