= Tripteroceratidae =

Tripteroceratidae Temporal range: M-U Ordovician

Scientific classification
- Domain: Eukaryota
- Kingdom: Animalia
- Phylum: Mollusca
- Class: Cephalopoda
- Subclass: Nautiloidea
- Order: †Oncocerida
- Family: †Tripteroceratidae; Flower (1941)

Genera
- See text

Extinct family of molluscs

The Tripteroceratidae is a family of depressed, straight to slightly curved nautiloid cephalopods from the middle and upper Ordovician with generally flattened venters and empty siphuncles with straight to inflated segments included in the Oncocerida (Sweet, 1964).

The Tripteroceratidae appeared almost simultaneously with the Oncoceratidae and Valcouroceratidae early in the Middle Ordovician, and are most likely derived from the Graciloceratidae.

== Genera ==
The Tripteroceratdae includes five known genera, as briefly described.

Tripteroceras, the type genus, named by Hyatt (1884) is characterized by a small, straight or slightly exogastric shell with a broad, depressed triangular cross section. The venter, underneath, is flat, the dorsum, above, broadly rounded with a median ridge or keel and lateral angles acute. (Sweet 1964). The siphuncle is small, ventral, and with segments that are only slightly expanded, and thought to be empty. Tripteroceras is known from North America and possibly Norway.

Allumettoceras, from the Middle and Upper Ordovician of North America and northern Europe, is similar to Tripteroceras except the siphuncle which starts off suborthochoanitic becomes cyrtochoanitic with subspherical segments in the later growth stages. Allumettoceras was named by Foerste in 1926

Hadoceras, named by Strand in 1934, is a tripteroceratid with a broadly arched under side and more highly arched upper, respectively venter and dorsum. The siphuncle, located between the center and ventral margin, is cyrtochoanitic; segments are expanded within the chambers and have faint annulosiphonate deposits lining the septal openings. Hadoceras is known from the Upper Ordovician of Norway.

Rasmussenoceras, named by Foerste (1932); a tripteroceratid from the middle and upper Ordovician of North America and Greenland with a broadly lenticular section and sharp lateral angles, in which the ventral siphuncle is suborthochoantitic to orthochoantitic with segments only slightly expanded into the chambers.

Tripterocerina, like Tripteroceras except that the dorsum is fluted as well as keeled. Tripterocerina, named by Foerste (1935) comes from the Upper Ordovician of North America (Wyoming)
