= Wadeoceras =

Wadeoceras Temporal range: Middle Silurian - Late Devonian

Scientific classification
- Kingdom: Animalia
- Phylum: Mollusca
- Class: Cephalopoda
- Subclass: Nautiloidea
- Order: †Oncocerida
- Family: †Polyelasmoceratidae
- Genus: †Wadeoceras; Teichert, 1939

Extinct genus of molluscs

Wadeoceras is a genus of nautiloids included in the Polyelasmoceratidae, a family of oncocerids living from the Middle Silurian to the Late Devonian.

The phragmocone of Wadeoceras is cyrtoconic (curved) and the living chamber, more orthoconic (straight).
