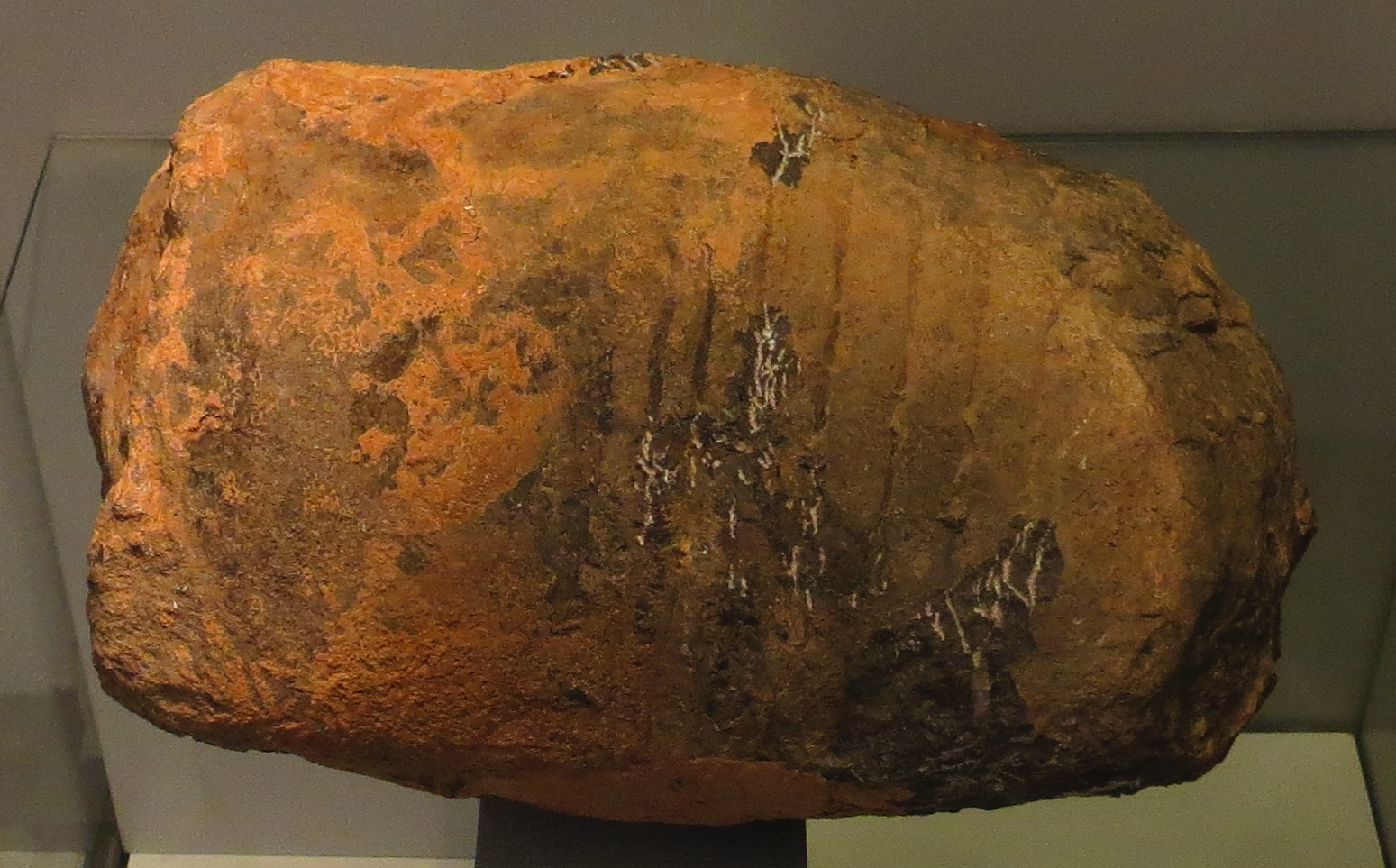

Scientific classification
- Domain: Eukaryota
- Kingdom: Animalia
- Phylum: Mollusca
- Class: Cephalopoda
- Subclass: Nautiloidea
- Order: †Oncocerida
- Family: †Poterioceratidae
- Genus: †Mecynoceras; Foerste, 1926

= Mecynoceras =

Mecynoceras Temporal range: Late Devonian

Extinct genus of molluscs

Mecynoceras is a genus of Late Devonian oncocerids included in the Poterioceratidae, a family of subcircular to compressed exogastric cyrtocones without a hyponomic sinus.

Mecynoceras has a compressed, gibbous cyrtoconic shell. The venter, especially of the chambered phragmocone is convex in profile; the body chamber long and tubular. Septa are transverse, close spaced; the siphuncle large, subcentral, with actinosiphonate deposits.

Cyrtogomphus, Lysagoroceras, and Poterioceras are among related genera.
