= Danoceras =

Danoceras Temporal range: ?M - Late Ordovician

Scientific classification
- Domain: Eukaryota
- Kingdom: Animalia
- Phylum: Mollusca
- Class: Cephalopoda
- Subclass: Nautiloidea
- Order: †Oncocerida
- Family: †Diestoceratidae
- Genus: †Danoceras; Troedsson, 1926

Extinct genus of nautiloids

Danoceras is an essentially straight shelled oncocerid named by Troedsson in 1926, and included in the Diestoceratidae. It has been found in the upper, and possibly middle, Ordovician of Europe, (Estonia), Greenland, and Russia, (Taimyr Peninsula). Named species include Danoceras ravni, type, D. inutile, D. scandinavicum, and D. skalbergensis.

The Danoceras shell is oval in section, laterally compressed with broadly rounded sides and narrowly rounded dorsum and venter. Chambers are short, septa close spaced, sutures straight and transverse. The siphuncle is subventral, close to but not touching the ventral margin. In form, cyrtochoanitic, necks recumbent.

Related genera include Diestoceras, Dowlingoceras, Lychholmoceras, and Suttonoceras.
