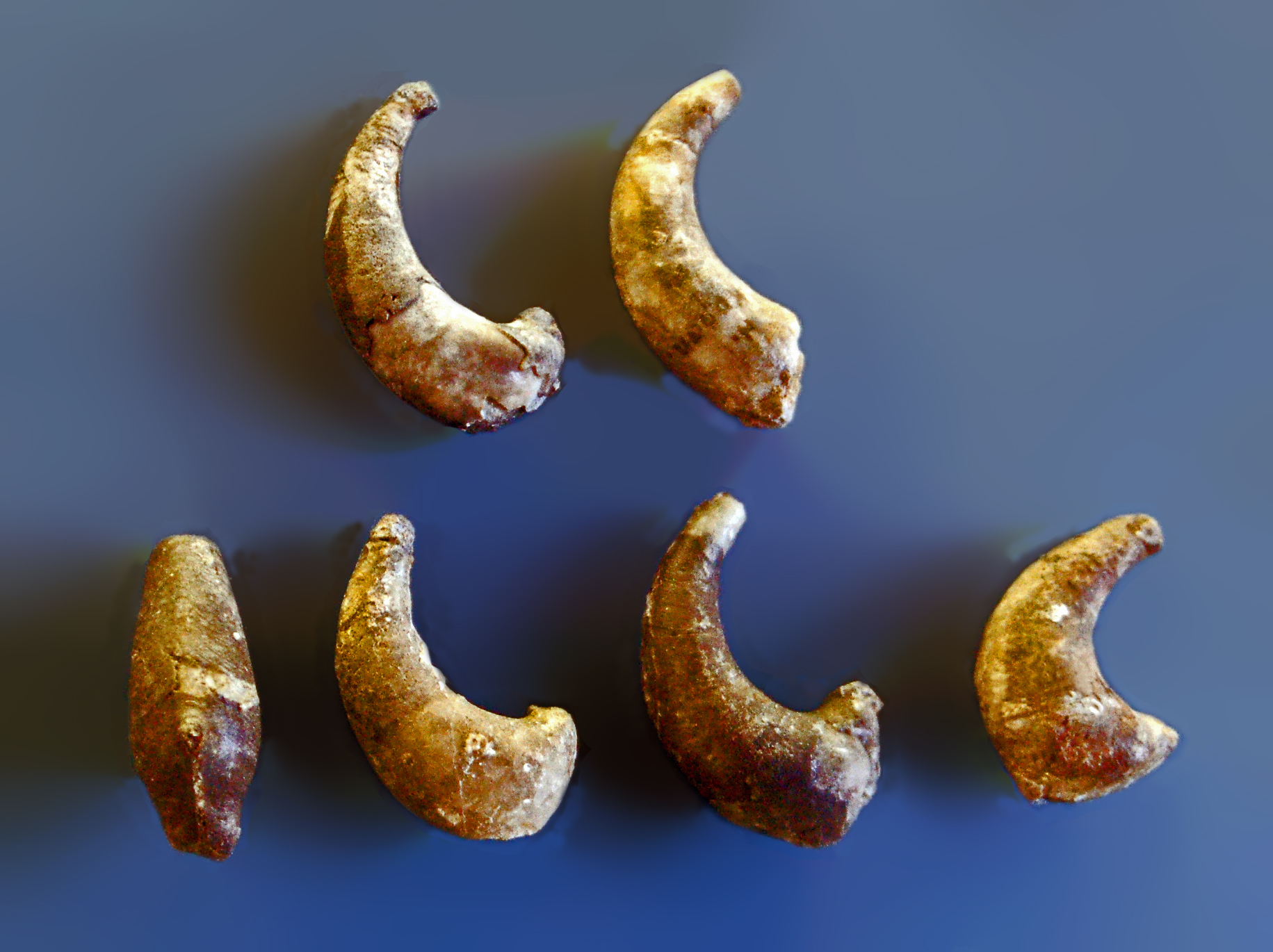
- Inversoceras perversum, Barrande from Prague Zadní Kopanina (Czech Republic) at the National Museum (Prague)

Scientific classification
- Kingdom: Animalia
- Phylum: Mollusca
- Class: Cephalopoda
- Subclass: Nautiloidea
- Order: †Oncocerida
- Family: †Trimeroceratidae; Hyatt and Zittel 1900

= Trimeroceratidae =

Trimeroceratidae Temporal range: Silurian

Extinct family of molluscs

Trimeroceratidae is a family of molluscs in the order Oncocerida. These molluscs were fast-moving nektobenthic carnivores. They lived in the Silurian period.

== Distribution ==
Species have been found in Silurian-era strata of Canada (Québec), China, Czechia, Italy, Russia, Sweden, and the United States (Indiana, Wisconsin).

== Genus ==
- Clathroceras
- Eotrimeroceras
- Inversoceras
- Jeppssonoceras
- Patagiumoceras
- Pentameroceras
- Plemeroceras
- Simonssoceras
- Stenogomphoceras
- Trimeroceras

== See also ==
- List of nautiloids
