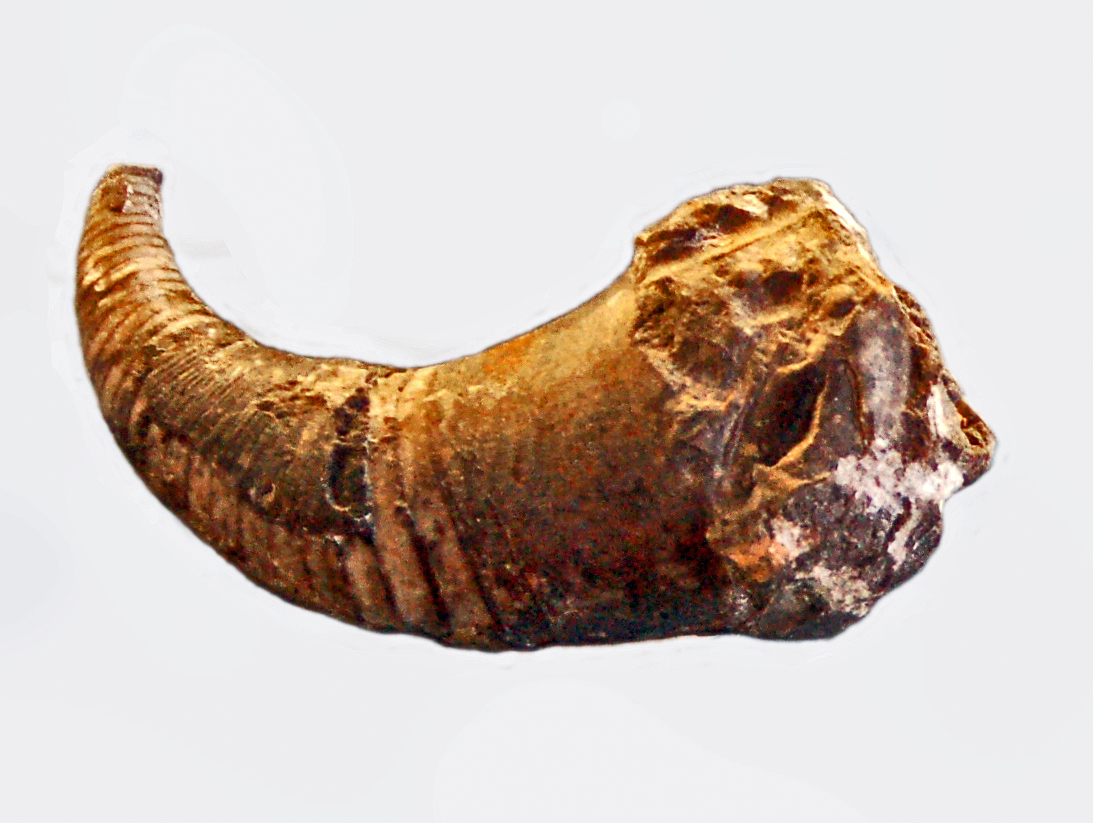
- Oonocerina plebeia, Barrande from Slivenec, Prague, (Czech Republic) at the National Museum (Prague)

Scientific classification
- Kingdom: Animalia
- Phylum: Mollusca
- Class: Cephalopoda
- Subclass: Nautiloidea
- Order: †Oncocerida
- Family: †Oncoceratidae

Genera
- Dunleithoceras; Ehlersoceras; Loganoceras; Oocerina; Oonoceras; Paroocerina; Richardsonoceras; Romingoceras

= Slender Oncoceratidae =

Slender Oncoceratidae Temporal range: M Ord- U Sil

Group of nautiloids

Slender Oncoceratidae are those in the family Oncoceratidae, (Nautiloidea, Oncocerida) which have slender, commonly curved, shells. Some like Oocerina are gently curved, almost straight, and with only slight expansion. Others like Dunleithoceras are strongly curved with a more notable rate of expansion. Inclusion in this somewhat arbitrary category is based on illustrations in the Treatise Part K, 1964.

== Included genera ==
Loganoceras and Romingoceras from the Middle Ordovician of North America have strongly curved shells. Loganoceras, named by Foerste in 1921, (K284) has a circular cross section and an empty siphuncle ventral of the center. The genotype, L. regulare, comes from Ontario. Romingoceras, also named by Foerste in 1932, differs in having a depressed, ovoid, cross section. Romingoceras expands slowly and like Loganoceras is strongly curved, may even be gyroconic (openly coiled). The ventral siphuncle is small, with oblong segments. The genotype, R. josephianum also comes from Ontario.

Also from the Middle Ordovician of North America is the long, slightly curved Ehlersoceras (K284), named by Foerste, 1932. Ehlersoceras has a small subventral siphuncle, depressed cross section and almost no expansion. As with Longanoceras and Romingoceras, the genotype of Ehlersoceras, E. huronense comes from Ontario. Ehlersoceras differs from Longanoceras and Romingoceras in having a much gentler exogastric curvature.

Richardsonoceras (K288), named also by Foerste in 1932, and Dunleithoceras (K284), named by him in 1924, come from both the Middle and Upper Ordovician of North America. Both are strongly curved with a notable rate of expansion; ventral sides, as with the previous genera, are on the outside, convex curvature, making them, again, exogastric.

Dunleithoceras has a subcircular cross sections with a rounded longitudinal ridge on the venter. Richardsonoceras, has a sharply rounded, keel-like, venter. Richardsonoceras is less rapidly expanding and not as strongly curved as Dunleithoceras. The genotype of Dunleithoceras, D. dunleithense, comes from the Middle Ordovician of Illinois, that of Richardsonoceras, R. simplex, is from the Middle Ordovician of Ontario.

Oonoceras (K288), from the Middle Ordovician to Middle Silurian of Europe and North America named by Hyatt in 1884, has a slender compressed exogastrically curved shell with a gradual expansion. The genotype, O. acinaces, is from Middle Silurian of central Europe. The sutures in Oonoceras form lateral lobes. The camerae (chambers) and body chamber are short. The siphuncle, which is close to the venter, is cyrtochoanitic, empty, with expanded segments. Oocerina (K288), named by Foerste, 1926, is a slender, exogastric genus, like Oonoceras, from the Upper Silurian of Europe, Russia and possibly North America. Oocerina differs primarily in having an actinosiphonate siphuncle composed of numuloidal (beaded) segments. Paroocerina (K288), named by Zhurevleva in 1961, is a slender oncoceratid from the Middle and Upper Silurian of eastern Europe and ex-USSR (Russia), similar to Oocerina, but with a hyponomic sinus. The genotypes of Oocerina and Paroocerina, respectively O.lentigratum and P. podolskensis, are from the Upper Silurian of central Europe and Russia

== Relationships ==
A close relationship can be inferred between Loganoceras and Romingoceras and between Dunleithoceras and Richardsonoceras from the Middle and Upper Ordovician of North America as they are respectively from the same area from the same time. Ehlersoceras seems to stand more alone. A close relationship may also be inferred between the primarily Silurian genera from Europe, including Russia; Oonoceras, Oocerina and Paroocerina, which are very similar in overall form.

The slender type oncoceratids give way to the strongly compressed Digenuoceras with sharply acute dorsum and venter, and to the more conical Miamiceras and Rizoceras.
