= Nothoceratidae =

Nothoceratidae Temporal range: Silurian–Upper Devonian

Scientific classification
- Domain: Eukaryota
- Kingdom: Animalia
- Phylum: Mollusca
- Class: Cephalopoda
- Subclass: Nautiloidea
- Order: †Oncocerida
- Family: †Nothoceratidae; Fischer, 1882

Extinct family of molluscs

Nothoceratidae is a family of nautiloid cephalopods in the orthoceratoid order Oncocerida in which shells are exogastrically or endogastrically breviconic, planospiral, or torticonic; often with a constricted or visored aperture; and a siphuncle commonly composed of concave segments and occupied by actinosiphonate deposits. Some ten genera have been described which lived during the time between the Early Silurian and Late Devonian. The ancestral form is probably Perimecoceras which is known from the Upper Silurian of central Europe and which is similar in external form the Oonoceras from the Oncoceratidae.

== Genera ==
- Blakeoceras
- Bolloceras
- Conostichoceras
- Cyrthoceratites
- Lorieroceras
- Metaphragmoceras
- Mutoblakeoceras
- Nothoceras
- Paraconradoceras
- Perimecoceras
- Tafilaltoceras
- Turnoceras
