= Trimeroceras =

Trimeroceras Temporal range: Telychian–Ludlow

Scientific classification
- Kingdom: Animalia
- Phylum: Mollusca
- Class: Cephalopoda
- Subclass: Nautiloidea
- Order: †Oncocerida
- Family: †Trimeroceratidae
- Genus: †Trimeroceras; Hyatt, 1884

Type species
- Gomphoceras staurostoma (Barrande 1865)

Species
- Trimeroceras bulbosum Stridsberg, 1985; Trimeroceras cylindricum (Barrande, 1865); Trimeroceras ellipticum (M'Coy, 1855); Trimeroceras gilberti (Kindle & Breger, 1904); Trimeroceras staurostoma (Barrande, 1865)

Extinct genus of molluscs

Trimeroceras is a genus of straight oncocerid (Nautilodea, Cephalopoda) from the Silurian (Telychian to Ludlow) of Europe, China, and North America. Originally classified as a part of Gomphoceras, it is now type for the Trimeroceratidae.

It comprises at least five species. Trimeroceras bulbosum and T. cylindricum are found across Eurasia, while T. ellipticum is restricted to Scotland and Wales, and T. gilberti is only known from two specimens from Indiana. Fossils of the former two have been found in Sichuan, China, as well as in Gotland, Sweden and in several localities across the Czech Republic. Another related species, Gomphoceras alphaeus, has been suggested to also belong to Trimeroceras.

== Description and behavior ==
Like other related oncocerids, the shell of Trimeroceras is straight and of equal width and height up to the septum of truncation and bearing horizontal markings, with a later curved apical part. It is often found lacking its apical part past the septum of truncation.

Trimeroceras had a restricted slit-like aperture which, on top of the hyponomic sinus acting as water-jet funnel, allowed only a small number of tentacles to exist which would have been much smaller than that of modern Nautilus. These tentacles were most importantly used for gathering food, but it is unlikely that they were used for prey capture as large prey would not be able to fit through the narrow sinus. The numerous retractor muscles arranged uniformly through the body instead suggests a microphagous feeding habit. It likely suspended itself vertically above the benthos, face-down, and filtered the water column. It is assumed that Trimeroceras did not inhabit shallow waters in reefs, as environments with strong currents would have caused it distress. It instead probably spent its life at great depths.

Based on the structure of Trimeroceras's connecting rings and the mass distribution of mature oncocerid shells in carbonate facies, it is possible that they used modified body chambers to brood eggs internally before spawning in shallow water environments.

=== Mobility ===
Like other brevicones, Trimeroceras had lost the ability to swim effectively but had retained the hyponome as part of the respiratory apparatus. However, as the hyponomic sinus was located close to the anterior end, any sudden use of jet propulsion would only cause the animal to swing forwards, followed by a backwards swing when breathing again. While still useful for slow movement, it would thus not be a useful way to escape predators, with a more likely possibility being for Trimeroceras to retract its protruding soft parts in its shell.

=== Size dimorphism ===
T. cylindricum and T. bulbosum both exhibit size dimorphism which may be linked with sex. This is largely reflected in the shells, with some specimens (macroconchs) being distinctly larger in size than the others (microconchs). In the case of T. cylindricum, microconch shells range between 18–21 mm of height and width, while those of macroconchs are found to be in a 22–26 mm range.

Though it isn't known with certainty to which sex the larger shell size belonged, it has been hypothesized that the extra space in the shell may have been taken up by an organ analogous to the spadix and antispadix of Nautilus. This would make the macroconchs representative of males.
