= Manitoulinoceras =

Manitoulinoceras Temporal range: Late Ordovician

Scientific classification
- Domain: Eukaryota
- Kingdom: Animalia
- Phylum: Mollusca
- Class: Cephalopoda
- Subclass: Nautiloidea
- Order: †Oncocerida
- Family: †Valcouroceratidae
- Genus: †Manitoulinoceras; Foeste, 1924

Extinct genus of molluscs

Manitoulinoceras is a genus of Late Ordovician oncocerid nautiloid cephalopods, found in North America (Kentucky, Ohio, Indiana, and Ontario). The shell is cyrtoconic, exogastric, more strongly curved than in Kindleoceras. The cross-section is somewhat wider than high, with a somewhat flattened upper side, known as the dorsum. Actinosiphonate deposits in the siphuncle are confined to the early part of the phragmocone.

Staufferoceras, a valcuouroceratid from the Middle and Upper Ordovician of Minnesota and Ohio named by Foeste, 1932, is much like Manitoulinoceras but with a living chamber that is swollen in the middle, narrowing toward the aperture.
