= Hemiphragmoceratidae =

Hemiphragmoceratidae Temporal range: Mid Silurian -?Mid Devonian

Scientific classification
- Kingdom: Animalia
- Phylum: Mollusca
- Class: Cephalopoda
- Subclass: Nautiloidea
- Order: †Oncocerida
- Family: †Hemiphragmoceratidae; Foeste (1926)

Genera
- Hemiphragmoceras; Conradoceras; Hexameroceras; Octamerella; Tetrameroceras

Extinct family of molluscs

Hemiphragmoceratidae is a family of endogastrically brevconic oncocerids characterized by elaborately visored apertures in which the hyponomic sinus in mature specimens is on a spout-like process and there may be lateral and dorsal salients. (Sweet 1964, Flower 1950). Shells are compressed with the apical portion curved and the anterior straight. Siphucles are nummuloideal with expanded spheroidal segments and continuously actinosiphonate interiors.

The Hemiphragmoceratidae are probably descended from the Oncoceratidae and are known from the middle and upper Silurian but may range into the middle Devonian (Sweet 1964). They are similar with regard to their constricted and ornate apertures to the middle Silurian exogastric Trimeroceratidae and the Siluro-devonian discosorid Phragmoceratidae (Teichert 1964)

Some five genera have been described; Hemiphragmoceras, Conradoceras, Hexameroceras, Octamerella, and Tetrameroceras.
