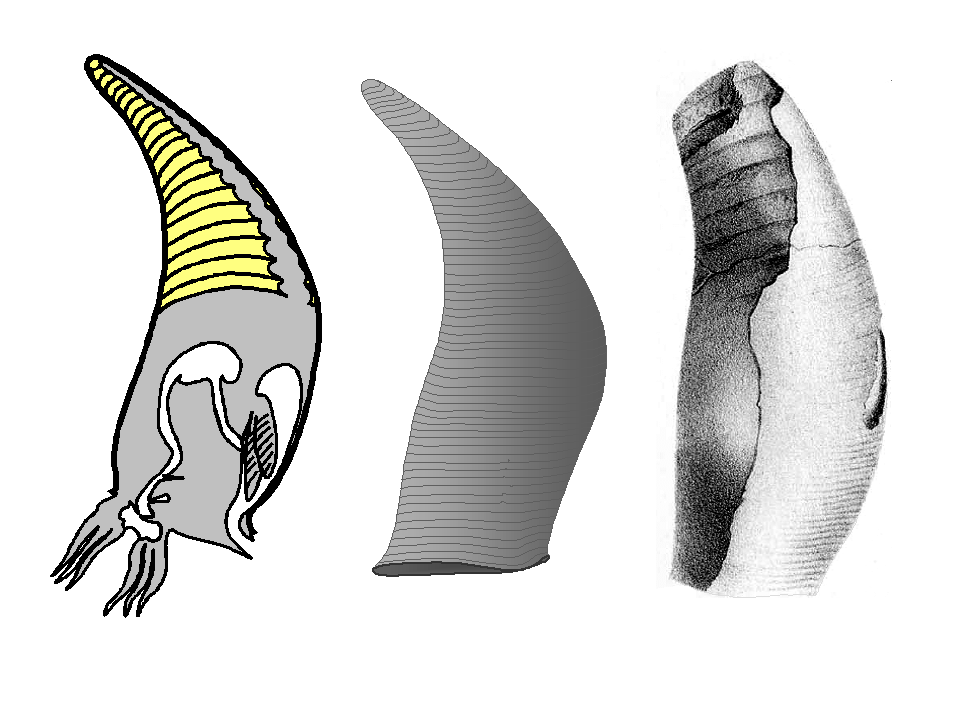
- Oncoceras semirubella

Scientific classification
- Domain: Eukaryota
- Kingdom: Animalia
- Phylum: Mollusca
- Class: Cephalopoda
- Subclass: Nautiloidea
- Order: †Oncocerida
- Family: †Oncoceratidae
- Genus: †Oncoceras; Hall,1847

= Oncoceras =

Oncoceras Temporal range: Mid -Late Ordovician

Extinct genus of molluscs

Oncoceras is a genus of oncocerids, family Oncoceratidae from the middle and upper Ordovician of North America and Europe.

The shell, or conch, of Oncoceras is relatively short, a curved, compressed brevicone with a maximum width in the phragmocone just behind the body chamber, narrowing toward the aperture. The siphuncle is small, necks recurved.
