= Kindleoceras =

Kindleoceras Temporal range: Middle and Late Ordivician

Scientific classification
- Domain: Eukaryota
- Kingdom: Animalia
- Phylum: Mollusca
- Class: Cephalopoda
- Subclass: Nautiloidea
- Order: †Oncocerida
- Family: †Valcouroceratidae
- Genus: †Kindleoceras; Foeste, 1924

Extinct genus of molluscs

Kindleoceras is a genus of oncocerids belonging to the Valcouroceratidae, extinct nautiloid cephalopods that lived during the Middle and Late Ordovician.

Kindleoceras is characterized by a gently curved or virtually straight shell, the cross section of which is triangular with flattened dorsum and subangular venter. The siphuncle is small, ventral, cyrtochoanitic with outwardly flared necks, thickened rings, and well developed radial internal actinosiphonate deposits.

In general form Kindleoceras is similar to Manitoulinoceras except for its triangular cross section. Augustoceras, another valcouroceratid, differs in that the rays in its actinosiphonate deposits are longer but less numerous.

Kindleoceras, named by Foeste, has been found in the Middle and Upper Ordovician of Ontario in Canada.
