= Oonoceras =

Oonoceras Temporal range: Middle Ordovician - Middle Silurian

Scientific classification
- Kingdom: Animalia
- Phylum: Mollusca
- Class: Cephalopoda
- Subclass: Nautiloidea
- Order: †Oncocerida
- Family: †Oncoceratidae
- Genus: †Oonoceras; Hyatt, 1884

Extinct genus of nautiloids

Oonoceras is an extinct genus of fossil cephalopods included in the nautiloid order Oncocerida and the family Oncoceratidae from the Middle Ordovician to Middle Silurian of North America and Europe, arbitrarily included in the slender Oncoceratidae.

Shells of this genus are generally slender, gradually expanding, exograstric cyrtocones with an ovoid cross section more narrowly rounded ventrally than dorsally as in (e.g.) Bassleroceras. Curvature is generally greater than that in Oocerina but less than that of Richardonoceras or Dunleithoceras.

The siphuncle of Oonoceras is cyrtochoanitic. Septal necks flare outwardly and unlike Oocerina, are empty. Segments are either slightly or broadly expanded into the chambers.
