= Karoceras =

Scientific classification
- Domain: Eukaryota
- Kingdom: Animalia
- Phylum: Mollusca
- Class: Cephalopoda
- Subclass: Nautiloidea
- Order: †Oncocerida
- Family: †Karoceratidae
- Genus: †Karoceras; Roussanoff, 1909

Extinct genus of molluscs

Karoceras is a genus of oncocerid nautiloids that lived during the Silurian and possibly Early Devonian, type genus for the Karoceratidae. The shell is a compressed, exogastric cyrtocone, section sub ovoid. The siphuncle is ventral, near the outer, externally convex curvature. Septal necks flair outwardly, segments are inflated ventrally and are straight dorsally, a character of the family.

Karoceras is the only member of the Karoceratidae that is actinosiphonate, a character produced by lamellae projecting radially inward toward the middle of the siphuncle from the connecting rings.

This genus has been found in central Europe in the region of the Czech Republic and on Novaya Zemlya.
