= Basslerocerida =

Basslerocerida Temporal range: Ordovician

Scientific classification
- Kingdom: Animalia
- Phylum: Mollusca
- Class: Cephalopoda
- Subclass: Nautiloidea
- Order: †Basslerocerida; Flower & Kummel, 1950

Order of nautiloids

Basslerocerida is an order of nautiloid cephalopods from the Ordovician comprising exogastric longiconic cyrtocones, that is no longer in common use.

== Taxonomy ==
The Order Basslerocerida was established by Flower and Kummel (1950) for forms intermediary between the ancestral Ellesmerocerida and the more advanced Tarphycerida and Oncocerida. The order, as originally defined, contains two families, the Bassleroceratidae with thick-walled siphuncles which gave rise to the Tarphycerida, and the Graciloceratidae, derived from the former, with thin-walled siphuncles which gave rise to the Onocerida. The speculation in Flower and Kummel (1950), that the Basslerocerida, through the Graciloceratidae, might have given rise to the Barrandeocerida may account for the inclusion of the Barradeocerina in the Basslerocerida in some classifications and the extension of the order to the Devonian. The derivation of barrandeoceroids from within the Tarphycerida is, however, well established.

Basslerocerida has fallen into general disuse, the taxa now being included in either the Ellesmerocerida or in the derived Tarphycerida and Oncocerida, although Sheverev (2006) continued to recognize the order. Furnish and Glenister (1964) included the Bassleroceratidae in the Ellesmerocerida while Sweet (1964) included its derivative, the Graciloceratidae, in the Oncocerida. Flower (e.g. 1976) instead, included the Bassleroceritidae in the Tarphycerida.

== Morphology ==
Nothing is known about the basslerocerid soft part anatomy, although they may be surmised to have had somewhat squid-like bodies with perhaps 8 or 10 arms.

Shells are rather small, reaching lengths of about 12 –15 cm (5 –6 in); elongate with an upward, exogastric, curvature -like a rocker -and subcircular to laterally compressed cross-section. The venter on the outer curvature is commonly more sharply rounded, giving it a keel-like form, than the dorsum on the inner curvature. Septa are close spaced, the siphuncle ventral.

The siphuncle in the Bassleroceratidae is composed of thick connecting rings, as found in the ancestral Ellesmerocerida and in primitive Tarphycerida. Connecting rings in the derived Graciloceratidae are thin, as found in the Oncocerida.
