= Polyelasmoceras =

Polyelasmoceras Temporal range: Early Devonian

Scientific classification
- Domain: Eukaryota
- Kingdom: Animalia
- Phylum: Mollusca
- Class: Cephalopoda
- Subclass: Nautiloidea
- Order: †Oncocerida
- Family: †Polyelasmoceratidae
- Genus: †Polyelasmoceras; Teichert and Glenister. 1952

Extinct genus of molluscs

Polyelasmoceras is an extinct genus of nautiloid from the Early Devonian, between 408 and 393 million years ago. The holotype specimen is held by Museums Victoria and was collected near Murrindal in Victoria.

There is a single species, Polyelasmoceras aduncum.
