= Diestoceratidae =

Scientific classification
- Domain: Eukaryota
- Kingdom: Animalia
- Phylum: Mollusca
- Class: Cephalopoda
- Subclass: Nautiloidea
- Order: †Oncocerida
- Family: †Diestoceratidae; Foeste, 1926

Genera
- See text

Extinct family of nautiloids

Diestoceratidae is a family in the nautiloid cephalopod order Oncocerida with compressed, straight to faintly endogastric breviconic shells with a marginal siphuncle that contains discrete, irregular actinosiphonate deposits.

The Diestoceratidae contains five known genera. They are:

- Diestoceras
- Danoceras
- Dowlingoceras
- Lyckholmoceras
- Suttonoceras
