= Nautilitoidea =

Nautilitoidea Temporal range: L Ordovician - Recent

Scientific classification
- Kingdom: Animalia
- Phylum: Mollusca
- Class: Cephalopoda
- Subclass: Nautiloidea
- Superorder: Nautilitoidea; Wade, 1988

Orders
- Nautilida; Oncocerida; Tarphycerida

Superorder of nautiloids

The Nautilitoidea is a superorder within the subclass Nautiloidea, comprising the phylogenetically related Nautilida, Oncocerida, and Tarphycerida.

The superorder has its roots in the Bassleroceratidae, the ancestral family of the Tarphycerida, sometimes included in the Ellesmerocerida. The Bassleroceratidae also gave rise to the Granciloceratidae, the ancestral family of the Oncocerida, which in turn gave rise to the Nautilida, which includes the Nautilidae which includes the living Nautilus.

By having the ancestral Bassleroceratidae in the Tarphycerida, the Nautilitoidea becomes monophyletic. With the Bassleroceratidae in the Ellesmerocerida, the Tarphycerida becomes distinct from the oncocerid-nautilid lineage, making the Nautilitoidea polyphyletic.
