= Jovellania =

Jovellania Temporal range: Lower Devonian

Scientific classification
- Domain: Eukaryota
- Kingdom: Animalia
- Phylum: Mollusca
- Class: Cephalopoda
- Subclass: Nautiloidea
- Order: †Oncocerida
- Family: †Jovellaniidae
- Genus: †Jovellania; Bayle, 1879

Extinct genus of molluscs

Jovellania is a genus of extinct prehistoric nautiloids from the order Oncocerida known from the Lower Devonian of Europe (France, Germany). Nautiloids form a broad group of shelled cephalopods that were once diverse and numerous but are now represented by only a handful of species in two genera.

Jovellania was named by Bayle (1879) and is type genus for the Jovellaniidae, a family assigned to the Oncocerida by Flower (1950)

== Morphology ==
Jovellania can be described as having a slowly widening, straight or slightly cytoconic shell with faint undulations and nearly circular or slightly depressed cross-section The ventrolateral sides are flattened causing the prosiphuncular (ventral) side to be slightly angular. Septa are closely spaced and sutures are transverse. The siphuncle is positioned between the center and the ventral margin and closer to the margin; segments are expanded into the chambers; actinosiphonate deposits consist of longitudinal lamellae.
