= Tetrameroceras =

Tetrameroceras Temporal range: Middle -Late Silurian

Scientific classification
- Kingdom: Animalia
- Phylum: Mollusca
- Class: Cephalopoda
- Subclass: Nautiloidea
- Order: †Oncocerida
- Family: †Hemiphragmoceratidae
- Genus: †Tetrameroceras; Hyatt, 1884

Extinct genus of molluscs

Tetrameroceras is a genus of short, essentially straight, breviconic, nautiloid cephalopods from the middle and Upper Silurian of Europe and North America included in the oncocerid family Hemiphragmoceraidae.

The body chamber is inflated, dorsal and ventral profiles both convex. Aperture contracted and visored with a long ventral hyponomic sinus, 2 pairs of shorter dorsolateral sinuses, and a short dorsal salient branching from the peristome. The siphuncle has continuous actinosiphonate deposits.
