= Karoceratidae =

Karoceratidae Temporal range: Early Silurian - ?Early Devonian

Scientific classification
- Domain: Eukaryota
- Kingdom: Animalia
- Phylum: Mollusca
- Class: Cephalopoda
- Subclass: Nautiloidea
- Order: †Oncocerida
- Family: †Karoceratidae; Teichert, 1939

Extinct family of molluscs

Karoceratidae is a family of nautiloids within the order Oncocerida, characterized by straight or curved, laterally narrow, shells and slender, ventral siphuncles that are empty except in Karoceras. Siphuncle segments are inflated ventrally but straight dorsally. Septal necks are cyrtochoanitic, outwardly curved; connecting rings are thin.

Genera include Karoceras, Osbornoceras, and possibly Shuranoceras, which have been found in sediments ranging from the Lower Silurian to possibly as young as the Lower Devonian.
