= Polyelasmoceratidae =

Polyelasmoceratidae Temporal range: Middle Silurian- Middle Devonian

Scientific classification
- Domain: Eukaryota
- Kingdom: Animalia
- Phylum: Mollusca
- Class: Cephalopoda
- Subclass: Nautiloidea
- Order: †Oncocerida
- Family: †Polyelasmoceratidae; Shimanskiy, 1956

Genera
- Codoceras; Coelocyrtoceras; Cyrtocheilus; Danaoceras; Evlanoceras; Hipparionoceras; Macrodomoceras; Polyelasmoceras; Turoceras; Wadeoceras

Extinct family of nautiloids

Polyelasmoceratidae is a family of oncocerid nautiloids characterized by rapidly expanding endogastrically curved shells, curved such that the ventral side is longitudinally concave. In cross section shells are typically tear-drop in shape to subtriangular. The siphuncle is typically nummuloidal, like a string of beads, with outwardly flared septal necks, and located between the center and the venter. Most contain radially lamellar actinosiphonate deposits.

The Middle Silurian Danaoceras is probably the ancestral genus, which give rise to the contemporary Codoceras and ultimately the subsequent Devonian genera.
