= Bassleroceratidae =

Bassleroceratidae Temporal range: Lower Ordovician

Scientific classification
- Domain: Eukaryota
- Kingdom: Animalia
- Phylum: Mollusca
- Class: Cephalopoda
- Subclass: Nautiloidea
- Order: †Ellesmerocerida
- Family: †Bassleroceratidae; Ulrich, Foerste, Miller & Furnish, 1944

Extinct family of molluscs

The Bassleroceratidae is a family of gradually expanding, smooth ellesmerocerids with a slight to moderate exogastric curvature, subcircular to strongly compressed cross section, and ventral orthochaonitc siphuncle. The ventral side is typically more sharply rounded than the dorsal side and septa are close spaced. Connecting rings are thick and slightly expanded into the siphuncle, making the segments slightly concave; characteristic of the Ellesmerocerida.

Basslerocerids are limited to the Lower Ordovician and first appeared sometime in the Gasconadian, (Tremedocian) They gave rise, possibly through Bassleroceras, by evolving and ever tightened curvature to the Tarphycerida and by a thinning of the connecting rings to the Graciloceratidae which are ancestral Oncocerida. Furthermore, they may have given rise through some form like Bassleroceras or Lawrenceoceras to directly to the Oncoceratid genus Richardsonoceras.

The Bassleroceratidae was named by Ulrich et al., 1944 and assigned to the Basslerocerida, an order proposed by Flower (1950) intermediary between the Ellesmerocerida and the Tarphycerida, which also included the Graciloceratidae. Flower later abandoned the Basslerocerida and added the Bassleroceratidae to its descendant group, the Tarphycerida. Furnish and Glenister on the other hand included the Bassleroceratidae in with its ancestral group, the Ellesmerocerida, where it is generally assigned.
