= Bassleroceras =

Bassleroceras Temporal range: L Ordovician

Scientific classification
- Kingdom: Animalia
- Phylum: Mollusca
- Class: Cephalopoda
- Subclass: Nautiloidea
- Order: †Ellesmerocerida
- Family: †Bassleroceratidae
- Genus: †Bassleroceras; Ulrich & Foeste, 1936

Genus of molluscs

Bassleroceras is an elongate upwardly curved, exogastric, genus of mollusks with the venter on the under side more sharply rounded than the dorsum on the upper. The siphuncle is ventral, composed of thick-walled tubular segments in which connection rings thicken in towardly as in both the Ellesmerocerida and primitive Tarphycerida.

Bassleroceras is the type genus of the Bassleroceratidae which Furnish and Glenister (1964) included in the Ellesmerocerida, but which Flower (1967) placed in the Tarphycerida. Bassleroceras gave rise to the Tarphycerida (sensu Furnish and Glenister, 1964) by evolving genera with tighter and tighter curvatures until becoming gyroconic, a character of the Estonioceratidae, a family of early tarphycerids.

Bassleroceras is found widespread in North America, e.g. New Mexico and New York, and in W. Australia.
