= Valcouroceratidae =

Valcouroceratidae Temporal range: M-U Ordovician

Scientific classification
- Kingdom: Animalia
- Phylum: Mollusca
- Class: Cephalopoda
- Subclass: Nautiloidea
- Order: †Oncocerida
- Family: †Valcouroceratidae; Flower, 1945

Genera
- See text

Extinct family of molluscs

The Valcouroceratidae is a family within the Oncocerida, nautiloid cephalopods from the middle and upper Ordovician, established by Rousseau Flower in 1945.

== Diagnosis ==
Valcouroceratids are characterized by exogastric cyrtocones and brevicones that change during the life span from compressed to depressed or subtriangular in cross section, and which have ventral siphuncles that are cyrtochoanitic and which contain lamellar actinosiphonate fillings. The actinosiphonate fillings, commonly referred to as deposits, are radially inward projections of the connecting rings that extend longitudinally along the inner wall of the siphuncle and project forward as blades into the siphuncle interior from the septal foramina.(Sweet 1964, Flower 1950)

== Distribution ==
Most valcouroceratids come from North America but Valcouroceras has been found in northern Europe (Norway) as well. (Sweet 1964)

== Genera ==
The Valcouroceratidae includes 8 genera:

- Valcouroceras
- Actinomorpha
- Augustoceras
- Fayettoceras
- Kindleoceras
- Manitoulinoceras
- Minganoceras
- Staufferoceras

The Valcouroceratidae comprises eight genera, three of which, Valcouroceras, Augustoceras, and Actinomorpha, were named by Flower in 1943 and 1946 and five of which, Fayettoceras, Kindleoceras, Manitoulinoceras, Minganoceras, and Staufferoceras, were named previously by Foeste between 1924 and 1938. Flower established the family Valcouroceratidae in 1945, based on Valcouroceras, which he named in 1943. All eight genera were included as late as 1950 where they rest today.
