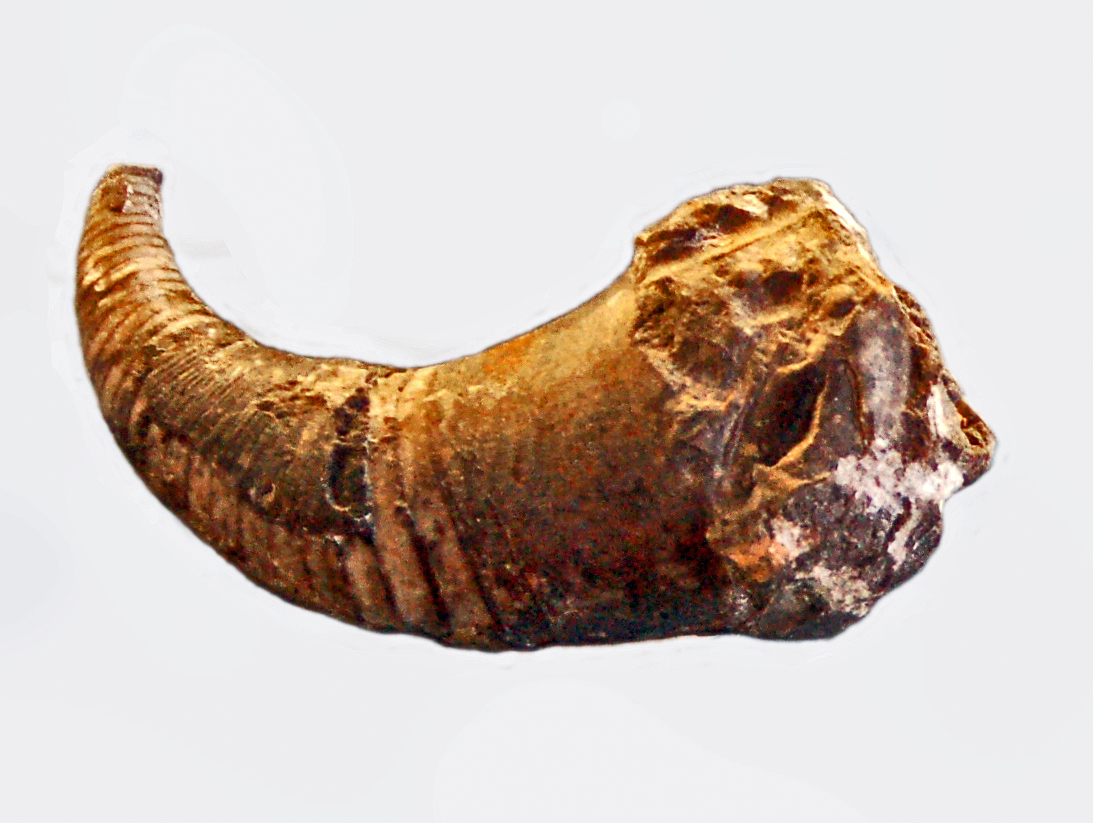
- Oonocerina plebeia, Barrande from Slivenec, Prague, Czech Republic at the National Museum (Prague)

Scientific classification
- Kingdom: Animalia
- Phylum: Mollusca
- Class: Cephalopoda
- Subclass: Nautiloidea
- Order: †Oncocerida
- Family: †Oncoceratidae; Hyatt, 1884

= Oncoceratidae =

Oncoceratidae Temporal range: M Ord- U Sil

Extinct family of nautiloids

Oncoceratidae is a family of nautiloid cephalopods in the order Oncocerida established by Hyatt, 1884, that range from the Middle Ordovician to the Upper Silurian.

== Diagnosis ==
Oncoceratidae are characterized by generally compressed, cyrtoconic, and breviconic shells with an exogastric curvature such that the ventral profile is convex or more so than dorsal, and in which the siphuncle is generally empty and located ventral of the center. In primitive forms, the siphuncle in early growth stages is composed of tubular segments with almost straight suborthochoanitic septal necks, but becomes cyrtochoanitic with expanded segments in the later growth stages, and is expanded and cyrtochoanitic throughout in advanced forms. In a few advanced forms, the siphuncle is actinosiphonate. (Flower 1950, Sweet 1964)

== Evolution ==
The Oncoceratidae first appeared early in the Middle Ordovician (Sweet 1964) simultaneously with the Graciloceratidae, Tripteroceratidae, and Valcouroceratidae, derived from the Graciloceratidae.(Flower 1950, 1976)

Some Middle Ordovician oncoceratids such as Richardsonoceras and Oonoceras are, however, externally more similar to Bassleroceras than to Graciloceras. Moreover, Richardsonoceras has been reported from the upper Lower Ordovician (Arenigian) of China, bringing its first appearance before the earliest known graciloceratids. Other oncoceratids such as Rhizoceras and Miamoceras show a greater affinity to the Graciloceratidae.

The Oncoceratidae through Oncoceras is thought to be the most likely source for the slightly endogastric Ordovician Diestoceratidae (Sweet 1964) and through the Early Silurian Amphycertoceras, for the Acleistoceratidae. The Oncoceratidae also gave rise to the dominantly Devonian Brevicoceratidae and Siluro-devonian Nothoceratidae through Oonoceras and to the largely Devonian Polyelasmoceratidae through either Oonoceras or Oocerina.(Sweet 1964)

== Subgroups ==
The Oncoceratidae can be subdivided into arbitrary and convenient subgroups based on morphologic similarity, based on illustrations in the Treatise K 1964 (figs 200–203, pp K285-K288). One comprising elongate slender forms is referred to as the slender Oncoceratidae. The other, comprising generally short, breviconic forms is referred to as the Breviconic Oncoceratidae .

== Breviconic Oncoceratidae ==
Breviconic Oncoceratidae comprise genera included in the family Oncoceratidae known from generally short, i.e. breviconic and often exogastrically curved shells. They are considered oncoceratids (nautiloid order Oncocerida) on the basis of having typically empty siphuncles ventral of the center that may be suborthochoanitic and tubular in the early growth stage and cyrtochoanitic with expanded segments in later growth stages or entirely. Connecting rings are thin. Breviconic oncoceratids differ from slender oncoeratids only in the matter of relative length. Inclusion is based on descriptions and illustrations in Sweet 1964 on the Oncerida in the Treatise on Invertebrate Paleontology, Park K.

=== Included genera ===
Breviconic oncoceratid genera include:

Oncoceras; compressed, curved brevicones, M-U Ord, N Am., Eu.
Beloitoceras; compressed, curved brevicones, like Oncoceras, M-U Ord, N Am., Eu.
Metarizoceras; slightly curved, compressed, rapidly expanding brevicons, M Sil. N Am.
Neumatoceras; compressed brevicones with maximum height behind posterior end of body chamber, M-U Ord., N Am., Eu.
?Vaupella; depressed, cyrtoconic brevicones with large ventral cytrochoanitic siphuncle, otherwise with characters of the family.
