= Oncocerida =

Oncocerida Temporal range: Middle Ordovician–Lower Carboniferous

Scientific classification
- Kingdom: Animalia
- Phylum: Mollusca
- Class: Cephalopoda
- Subclass: Nautiloidea
- Order: †Oncocerida; Flower, 1950

Extinct order of nautiloids

The Oncocerida comprise a diverse group of generally small nautiloid cephalopods known from the Middle Ordovician to the Mississippian (early Carboniferous; one possible member is known from the Early Permian), in which the connecting rings are thin and siphuncle segments are variably expanded (Flower, 1950). At present the order consists of some 16 families, a few of which, such as the Oncoceratidae, Brevicoceratidae, and Acleistoceratidae contain a fair number of genera each while others like the Trimeroceratidae and Archiacoceratidae are represented by only two or three (Sweet, 1964).

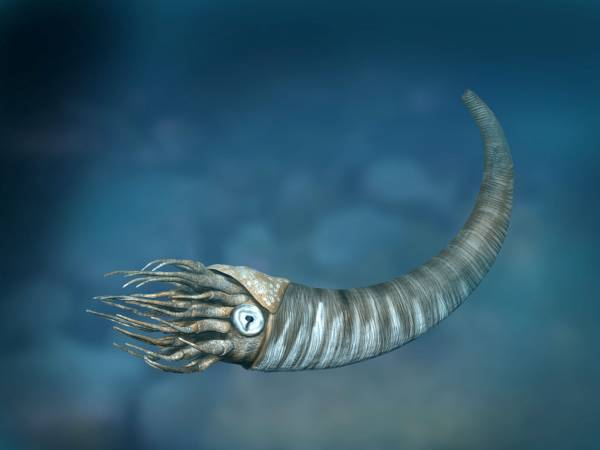
Life reconstruction of Cyrtoceras sp

== Physical characteristics ==
The shells of oncocerids are primarily somewhat compressed cyrtoconic brevicones. More advanced forms include gyrocones, serpenticones, torticones, and elongate orthocones and cyrtocones, reflective of the different families and genera (Flower, 1950; Sweet, 1964).

The siphuncle in the Oncocerida is commonly located at or near the ventral margin. Connecting rings are most commonly thin and structureless but in certain derived forms may become actinosiphonate with inwardly projecting radial lamellae. The juvenile segments in early genera are straight and tubular, with short orthochoanitic septal necks inherited from the Bassleroceratidae. Later in the mature stages of early forms and throughout in the more advanced the connecting rings are inflated with cyrtochoanitic septal necks, giving what can be described as a "beaded" or "ellipsoidal" appearance (Sweet, 1964).

== Evolution and diversity ==
The Oncocerida are thought to be derived from the Bassleroceratidae through Graciloceras as a result of a thinning of the connecting rings in the siphuncle (Flower, 1976).

Oncocerids reached their greatest generic diversity in the Middle Silurian with some 43 genera representing nine families (Sweet, 1964), the most at any time. Of these 43 or so genera, about 38 were new, a recovery from a precipitous decline in the Late Ordovician and Early Silurian. A second period of greater diversity occurred in the Middle Devonian with eight families represented by some 37 genera, following a second decline after the Middle Silurian. After this the order declined until its extinction in the Early Carboniferous (Mississippian).

Near the beginning of the Devonian and well before its end, the Oncocerida gave rise to the Rutoceratidae (Flower, 1976; Kümmel, 1964), which form the root stock of the Nautilida, which among its members includes the modern Nautilus and Allonautilus.

== Distribution and range ==
Oncocerids are well known as fossils from the later Ordovician, Silurian, and Devonian in North America, Europe, and Australia, and to a lesser extent from parts of Asia, after which the order declined into the Mississippian and reached its end by the Pennsylvanian (late Carboniferous) (Flower, 1976; Sweet, 1964).

== Taxonomy ==
Families in the Oncocerida, according to the Treatise on Invertebrate Paleontology, follow with the number of genera in each shown in parentheses, along with the stratigraphic range.

- Graciloceratidae (4) M-U Ord
- Tripteroceratidae (5) M-U Ord
- Valcouroceratidae (8) M-U Ord
- Diestoceratidae (5) M-U Ord
- Oncoceratidae (24) M Ord - U Sil
- Jovellaniidae (5) ? U Ord, M Sil - L Dev.
- Nothoceratidae (10) L Sil - U Dev
- Karoceratidae (3) L - M Sil, ?L Dev
- Hemiphragmoceratidae (5) M-U Sil, ?M Dev
- Acleistoceratidae (22) M Sil - M Dev
- Polyelasmoceratidae (13) M Sil - U Dev
- Brevicoceratidae (17) M Sil - U Dev
- Poterioceratidae (7) L Dev - L Carb
- Tripleuroceratidae (2) ?L Dev, M Dev - L Carb
- Archiacoceratidae (3) M Dev/

== Descendants ==
According to more current thinking, e.g. Flower, Teichert, and Kümmel, the Oncocerida gave rise to the Rutoceratidae which form the root stock of the Nautilida, which after a number of iterations, ends up with the modern Nautilus and Allonautilus.
