= Adeloceras =

Adeloceras Temporal range: Mississippian - Early Permian

Scientific classification
- Kingdom: Animalia
- Phylum: Mollusca
- Class: Cephalopoda
- Subclass: Nautiloidea
- Order: Nautilida
- Superfamily: Aipoceratoidea
- Genus: Adeloceras Zhuravleva, 1974

Extinct genus of molluscs

Adeloceras is a genus of Mississippian to Lower Permian nautiloid cephalopods included in the nautilid superfamily Aipoceratoidea along with genera like Aipoceras, Asymptoceras, and Solenochilus.
