= Permonautilus =

Permonautilus Temporal range: U Permian

Scientific classification
- Kingdom: Animalia
- Phylum: Mollusca
- Class: Cephalopoda
- Subclass: Nautiloidea
- Order: Nautilida
- Family: †Liroceratidae
- Genus: †Permonautilus; Kruglov, 1933

Extinct genus of nautilids

Permonautilus is an extinct genus of nautilids from the Upper Permian of Russia, named and described by Kruglov in 1933. Permonautilus is an involute, globular, spinose member of the Liroceratidae which are included in the Clydonautiloidea. Whorl sections are broad, with a rounded venter. The umbilicus in the middle of the shell is deep, from which spine-like processes extend laterally in the mature portion near the aperture. The siphuncle in Permonautilus is subcentral, the suture, slightly sinuous.

Externally, Permonautilus closely resembles the Pennsylvanian – Lower Permian Solenochilus and the Upper Mississippian Acanthonautilus, both which belong to the superfamily Aipoceratoidea: Permonautilus differs from the latter two genera in the anatomy of the subcentral siphuncle.
