= Librovitschiceras =

Librovitschiceras Temporal range: Late Carboniferous

Scientific classification
- Kingdom: Animalia
- Phylum: Mollusca
- Class: Cephalopoda
- Subclass: Nautiloidea
- Order: Nautilida
- Family: †Aipoceratidae
- Genus: †Librovitschiceras; Shimanskiy, 1957

Extinct genus of molluscs

Librovitschiceras is a genus of nautilids, in the subclass Nautiloidea, with a triangular cross section, included in the family Aipoceratidae. Its exact relationship with other aipoceratids is uncertain. Whorls are in contact, the siphuncle is slightly removed from the venter, which has a deep sinus.

Librovitschiceras lived during the Late Carboniferous in what is now western Russia. Aipoceras and Asymptoceras are possibly related.
