= Nassauoceras =

Nassauoceras Temporal range: Middle Devonian

Scientific classification
- Domain: Eukaryota
- Kingdom: Animalia
- Phylum: Mollusca
- Class: Cephalopoda
- Subclass: Nautiloidea
- Order: Nautilida
- Family: †Tetragonoceratidae
- Genus: †Nassauoceras; Miller, 1932

Genus of nautiloids

Nassauoceras is a tetragonoceratid nautiloid from the Middle Devonian of Europe, the shell of which is evolute with a wide, deep umbilicus, slight dorsal impression, low arched venter, rounded ventral shoulders, and flanks that converge dorsally so as to produce a subtrigonal whorl section. Nodes are present on the ventral shoulders. Sutures have shallow ventral and lateral lobes. The siphuncle is near the ventral margin.

Nassauoceras differs from Tetragonoceras in that the latter is gyroconic with a subquadrate whorl section and angular ventral shoulders, but is somewhat similar to Wellsoceras in which whorls are in contact in the early growth stages and shoulders are also rounded.
