= Lophoceras =

Lophoceras Temporal range: L Carboniferous (Miss)

Scientific classification
- Domain: Eukaryota
- Kingdom: Animalia
- Phylum: Mollusca
- Class: Cephalopoda
- Subclass: Nautiloidea
- Order: Nautilida
- Family: †Koninckioceratidae
- Genus: †Lophoceras; Hyatt, 1893

Extinct genus of molluscs

Lophoceras is a genus of Nautilids belonging to the tainoceratoidean family, Koninckioceratidae, found in Lower Carboniferous sediments in Europe, and named by Hyatt, 1893. The shell of Lophoceras is evolute, large, with a slight impressed zone on the inner rim. In early volutions whorl sections are rounded, but later develop an obtusely angular ventral area and venter that disappears toward the front of the mature body chamber. The suture has an angular ventral saddle, broad shallow lateral lobe, and a dorsal lobe. Except for growth line, the shell is smooth.
