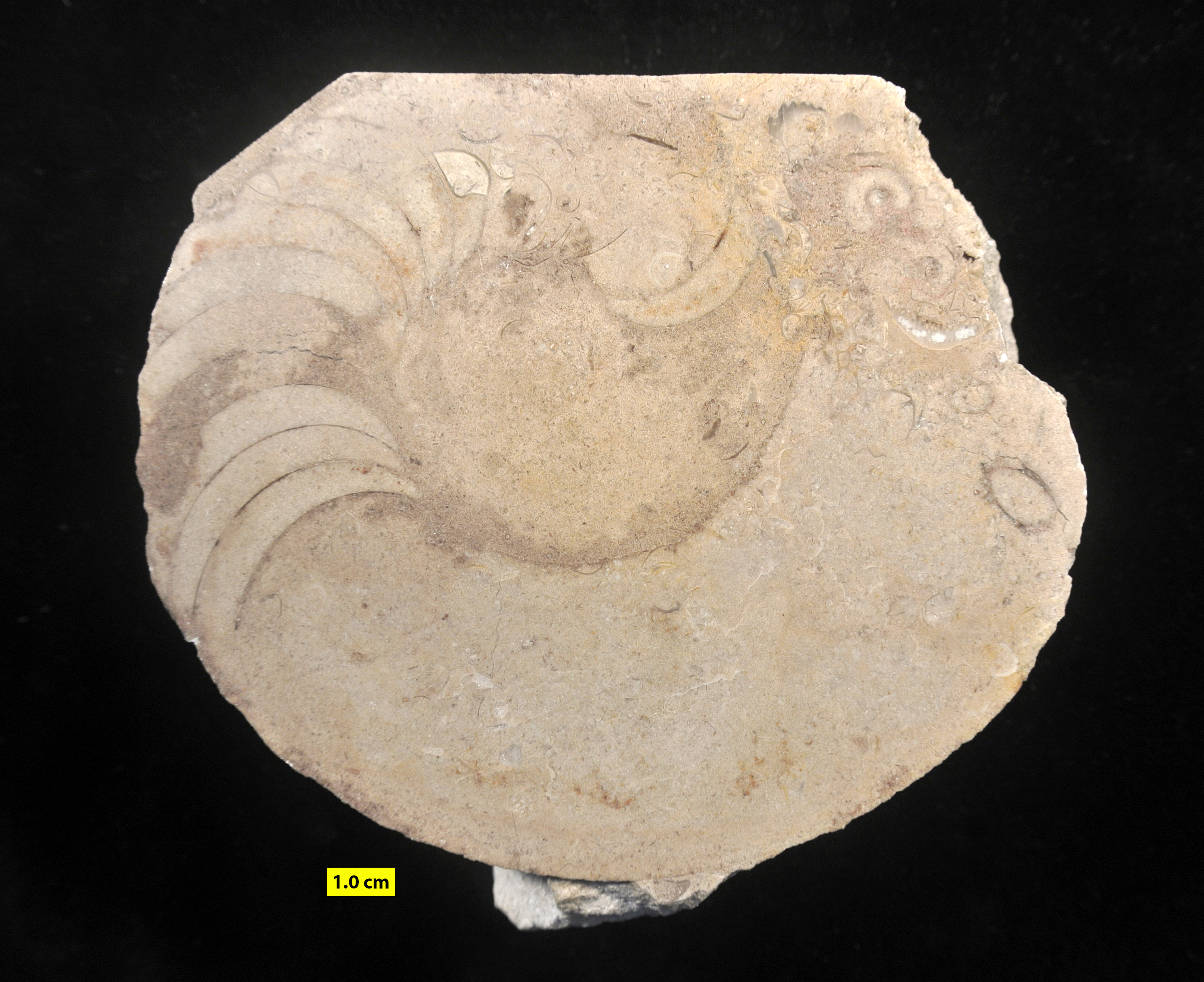
- Goldringia cyclops from the Middle Devonian of Ohio.
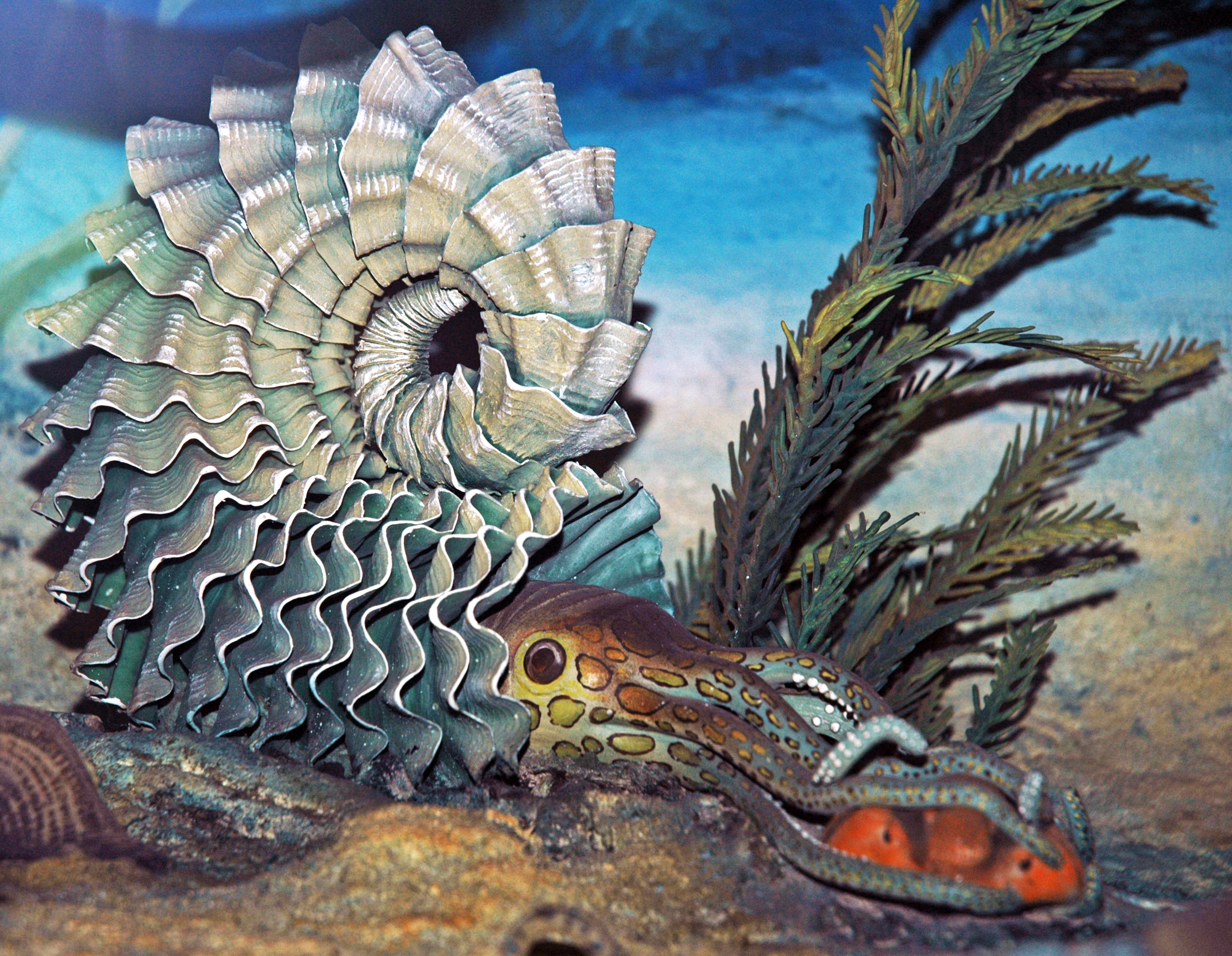
- Model of Goldringia eating a trilobite, Carnegie Museum of Natural History

Scientific classification
- Domain: Eukaryota
- Kingdom: Animalia
- Phylum: Mollusca
- Class: Cephalopoda
- Subclass: Nautiloidea
- Order: Nautilida
- Family: †Rutoceratidae
- Genus: †Goldringia; Flower, 1945

Synonyms
- Gyroceras -Hall, 1861

= Goldringia =

Goldringia Temporal range: Middle Devonian

Genus of nautiloids

Goldringia is an extinct nautilid of the Rutoceratidae family that lived during the Middle Devonian. It is known from New York, Ohio, and Indiana in the United States.

Goldringia, named by Rousseau Flower in 1945, has a gyroconic shell, coiled so as whorls do not touch. The cross section is slightly broader than high; the dorsum on the inside curvature is flatter than venter on the outside curvature. The siphuncle is ventral, tubular and free of organic deposits. The shell is encircled periodically by crenulate frills, each of which is bent apically so as for form a well defined hyponomic sinus, but are without spoutlike or spinose projections.

Halloceras, from the Lower Devonian, is a similar, gyroconiform rutoceratid.
