= Endolobus =

Endolobus Temporal range: Upper Mississippian - Lower Permian

Scientific classification
- Domain: Eukaryota
- Kingdom: Animalia
- Phylum: Mollusca
- Class: Cephalopoda
- Subclass: Nautiloidea
- Order: Nautilida
- Family: †Koninckioceratidae
- Genus: †Endolobus; Meek & Worthen, 1865

Extinct genus of nautiloids

Endolobus is an extinct genus from the nautiloid order, Nautilida. Nautiloids are a subclass of shelled cephalopods that were once diverse and numerous but are now represented by only a handful of species, including Nautilus. Endolubus is included in the family Koninckioceratidae which is part of the superfamily Tainoceratoidea (Kümmel, 1964. K424).

The shell of Endolobus is an evolute spiral with whorl sections subelliptical; broadly rounded ventrally, narrowly rounded laterally, and slightly impressed dorsally (Kümmel, 1964. K424). There are low nodes on the flanks and the suture is slightly sinuous but with a prominent dorsal lobe. The siphuncle is small, subcentral, and orthochoanitic.

Endolobus has a range from the Lower Carboniferous (U Miss) to the Lower Permian and has been found in different locations in North America and eastern Europe.
