= Homoadelphoceras =

Homoadelphoceras Temporal range: Middle Devonian

Scientific classification
- Kingdom: Animalia
- Phylum: Mollusca
- Class: Cephalopoda
- Subclass: Nautiloidea
- Order: Nautilida
- Family: †Rutoceratidae
- Genus: †Homoadelphoceras; Foerste, 1926

Extinct genus of molluscs

Homoadelphoceras is a genus of gyroconic rutoceratid Nautiloid from the Middle Devonian of central Europe. Whorls not in contact, venter and dorsum, (outer and inner rims), broadly rounded. Dorso-lateral and ventro-lateral flanks more or less flat, meet at an angle.

Homoadelphoceras resembles Adelphoceras which differs in that its whorls are in contact, producing an impressed zone on the inner rim, or dorsum.

Both are close to their oncocerid ancestors in that their siphuncles contain laminar actinosiphonate deposits.
