= Valhallites =

Scientific classification
- Domain: Eukaryota
- Kingdom: Animalia
- Phylum: Mollusca
- Class: Cephalopoda
- Subclass: Nautiloidea
- Order: Nautilida
- Family: †Koninckioceratidae
- Genus: †Valhallites; Shimansky, 1959

Valhallites is an extinct genus in the nautiloid order Nautilida which includes the living Nautilus found in the tropical western Pacific Ocean. Valhalites belongs to the Koninckioceratidae, a family in the Tainoceratoidea, a nautilid superfamily. (Kummel, 1964 K427)

Valhalites, which is given a range from the Lower Carboniferous (Mississippian) to the Lower Permian, has been found in North America (Arkansas) and Siberia. Its shell is evolute, rapidly expanding, with a depressed, elliptical whorl section. The venter is broadly rounded, the sides acute. The suture is with shallow ventral, lateral, and dorsal lobes. The shell itself bears short radial ribs, sinuous growth lines, and prominent longitudinal striae. The siphuncle is slightly ventral of the center. (Kummel, 1964 K427)

The nautiloids are a subclass of shelled cephalopods that were once diverse and numerous but are now represented by only a handful of species.

== See also ==
- Nautiloid
- List of nautiloids
