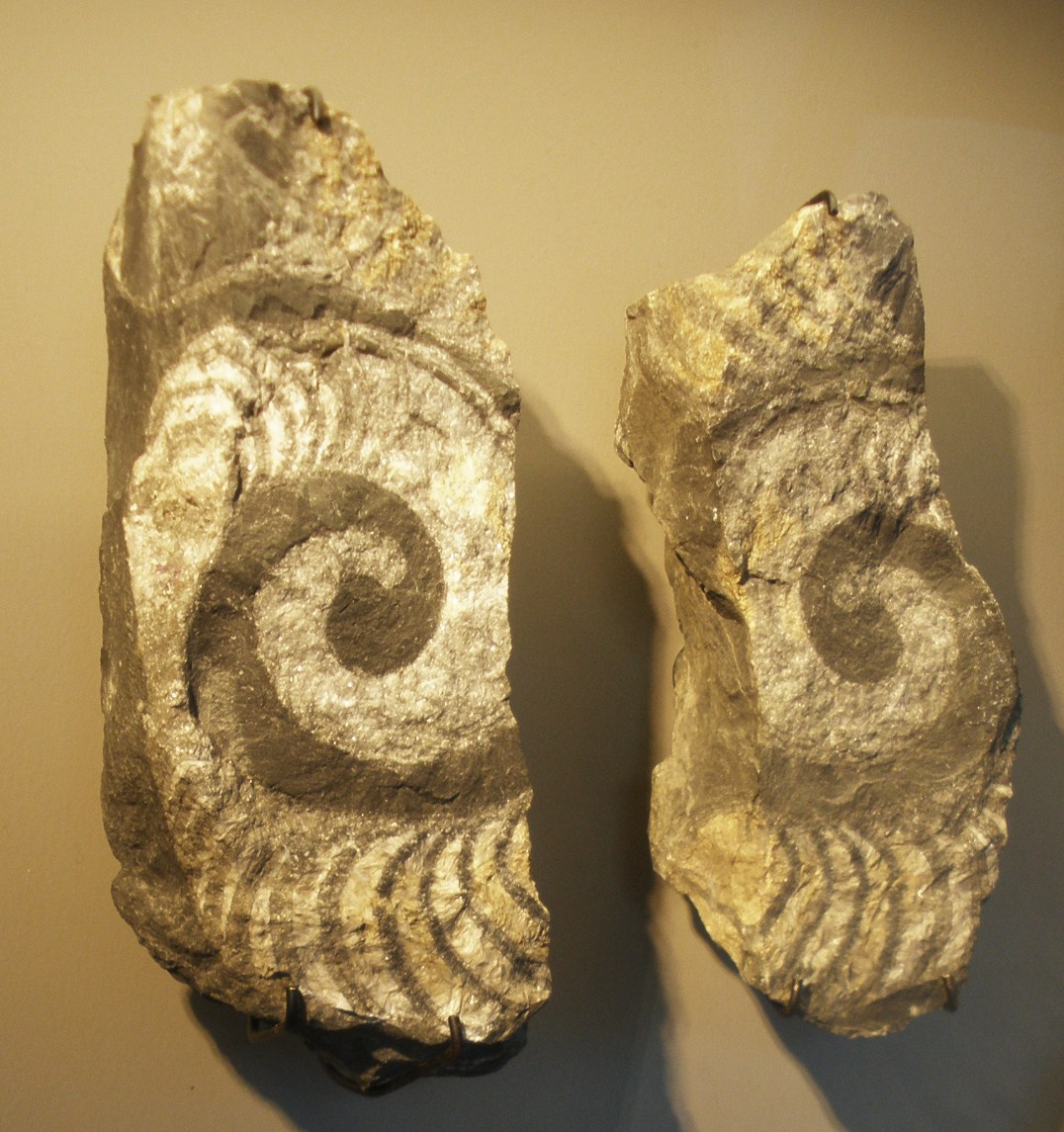
- Fossil of Hindeoceras located in the Musee d'Histoire Naturelle, Brussels.

Scientific classification
- Kingdom: Animalia
- Phylum: Mollusca
- Class: Cephalopoda
- Subclass: Nautiloidea
- Order: Nautilida
- Family: †Rutoceratidae
- Genus: †Hindeoceras; Flower, 1945

= Hindeoceras =

Hindeoceras Temporal range: Middle Devonian

Extinct genus of molluscs

Hindeoceras is a genus of nautilids belonging to the family Rutoceratidae that lived in North America during the middle Devonian period.

== Description ==
The shell of Hindioceras is described as large, gyroconic, with about 2 volutions, whorls being barely in contact. The inner margin or dorsum is broadly flattened to slightly concave, sides well rounded, the outer margin or venter arched. The surface is covered with nodes or spines in a regular rhythmic pattern. the siphuncle is near the venter, tubular, without organic deposits. There is a well developed hyponomic sinus for the hydro-jet or hyponome on ventral side of the aperture.
