= Tylodiscoceras =

Tylodiscoceras Temporal range: Mississippian

Scientific classification
- Kingdom: Animalia
- Phylum: Mollusca
- Class: Cephalopoda
- Subclass: Nautiloidea
- Order: Nautilida
- Family: †Koninckioceratidae
- Genus: †Tylodiscoceras; Miller & Collinson, 1950

Genus of molluscs

Tylodicoceras is a genus of the Koninckioceratidae (Cephalopoda, Nautiloid) from the Devonian through Mississippian of North America with a large, slightly involute, discoidal shell that is rounded laterally and concave ventrally. Their sides bear a single row with large rounded nodes.
