= Sholakoceras =

Sholakoceras Temporal range: L Permian

Scientific classification
- Kingdom: Animalia
- Phylum: Mollusca
- Class: Cephalopoda
- Subclass: Nautiloidea
- Order: Nautilida
- Family: †Rhiphaeoceratidae
- Genus: †Sholakoceras; Ruuzhentsev & Shimanskiy, 1954

Sholakoceras is an extinct genus of nautiloid cephalopods from the Lower Permian of southern Russia, included in the Tainoceratacean family Rhiphaeoceratidae, (order Nautilida). The shell of Shalakoceras is evolute with a perforate (see through) umbilicus. Whorl sections are subquadrate with the ventral and lateral sides flattened and ventral and umbilical shoulders rounded. Lateral areas bear short, slightly oblique ribs. sutures form broad ventral saddles with a slight, shallow lobe, very shallow lateral lobes, and a deep funnel-shaped dorsal lobe.

== See also ==
- List of nautiloids
