= Edaphoceras =

Edaphoceras Temporal range: Mississippian

Scientific classification
- Domain: Eukaryota
- Kingdom: Animalia
- Phylum: Mollusca
- Class: Cephalopoda
- Subclass: Nautiloidea
- Order: Nautilida
- Family: †Koninckioceratidae
- Genus: †Edaphoceras; Hyatt, 1884

Extinct genus of molluscs

Edaphoceras is a genus of koninckioceratid nautilids from the Mississippian of North America, named by Hyatt, 1884, with depressed whorls just in contact. The shell, as typical for the family, is evolute; whorl section is fusiform with broadly rounded venter and dorsum meeting at a narrow angle on either side. Its suture has a distinct ventral and dorsal lobe and an angular lateral saddle. The siphuncle is small and near central.
