= Subvestinautilus =

Subvestinautilus Temporal range: L Carboniferous (Miss)

Scientific classification
- Domain: Eukaryota
- Kingdom: Animalia
- Phylum: Mollusca
- Class: Cephalopoda
- Subclass: Nautiloidea
- Order: Nautilida
- Family: †Koninckioceratidae
- Genus: †Subvestinautilus; Turner, 1954

Extinct genus of molluscs

Subvestinautilus is a genus of evolute koninckioceratids, in the order Nautilida, with a depressed, trapezoidal whorl section. The venter is broadly rounded, ventrolateral shoulders sharply rounded, flanks flattened and converging toward a narrow rounded dorsum. In early growth stages a keel forms on the umbilical shoulder which becomes rounded or marked by a longitudinal rib at maturity . The suture has a broadly rounded ventral lobe and a deeper lateral lobe.

Subvestinautilus, named by Turner, 1954, has been found in the Lower Carboniferous of Ireland and the Isle of Man.
