= Rhiphaeoceratidae =

Rhiphaeoceratidae Temporal range: Late Permian

Scientific classification
- Domain: Eukaryota
- Kingdom: Animalia
- Phylum: Mollusca
- Class: Cephalopoda
- Subclass: Nautiloidea
- Order: Nautilida
- Superfamily: †Tainoceratoidea
- Family: †Rhiphaeoceratidae; Ruzhencev & Shimansky, 1954

Genera
- Pararhiphaeoceras; Rhiphaeoceras; Rhiphaeonautilus; Sholakoceras

Family of nautilids

The Rhiphaeoceratidae are a small family of nautilids included in the superfamily Tainoceratoidea that comprises four very similar genera. These genera are characterized by a perforate umbilicus and little more than a single evolute coil. Whorl sections are oval, subquadrate, or subtrapezoidal. Sutures bend forward on the outer rim, forming wide shallow ventral saddles and dip strongly to the rear on the inner rim, forming deep dorsal lobes.

Rhiphaeoceratidae was named by Ruzhencev and Shimansky in 1954 are, according to Kümmel (1964), derived from the Tainoceratidae, although no genus stands out as possible ancestor. They date from the Early Permian to Late Permian in age and are found in parts of Eurasia, south Urals: Azerbaijan, Kazakhstan, Tajikistan, and Italy.

Genera included, also named by Ruzhencev and Shimansky, 1954 are:

- Rhiphaeoceras: a riphaeoceritid first found the south Urals (L Perm) with an oval whorl section; flanks with faint, narrow radial ribs; suture with broad ventral saddle and deep dorsal lobe.
- Pararhiphaeoceras: a riphaeoceratid with a subtrapezoidal whorl section, widest across the venter, narrowing to the dorsum; flanks with short oblique ribs; suture as for Rhiphaeoceras. Found in L Permian in Azerbaijan and Tajikistan.
- Rhiphaeonautilus: a riphaeoceratid like Pararhiphaeoceras, with a subtrapezoidal whorl section, but with short inflated ribs on the lateral areas and with a shallow lobe modifying the ventral saddle. Also first found in the south Urals, as with Rhiphaeoceras.
- Sholakoceras: a riphaeoceratid with a subquadrate whorl section, venter and sides flattened, lateral areas bearing slightly oblique ribs. The suture is similar to that of Rhiphaeonautilus, with a broad ventral saddle modified by a shallow lobe.

== See also ==
- List of nautiloids
