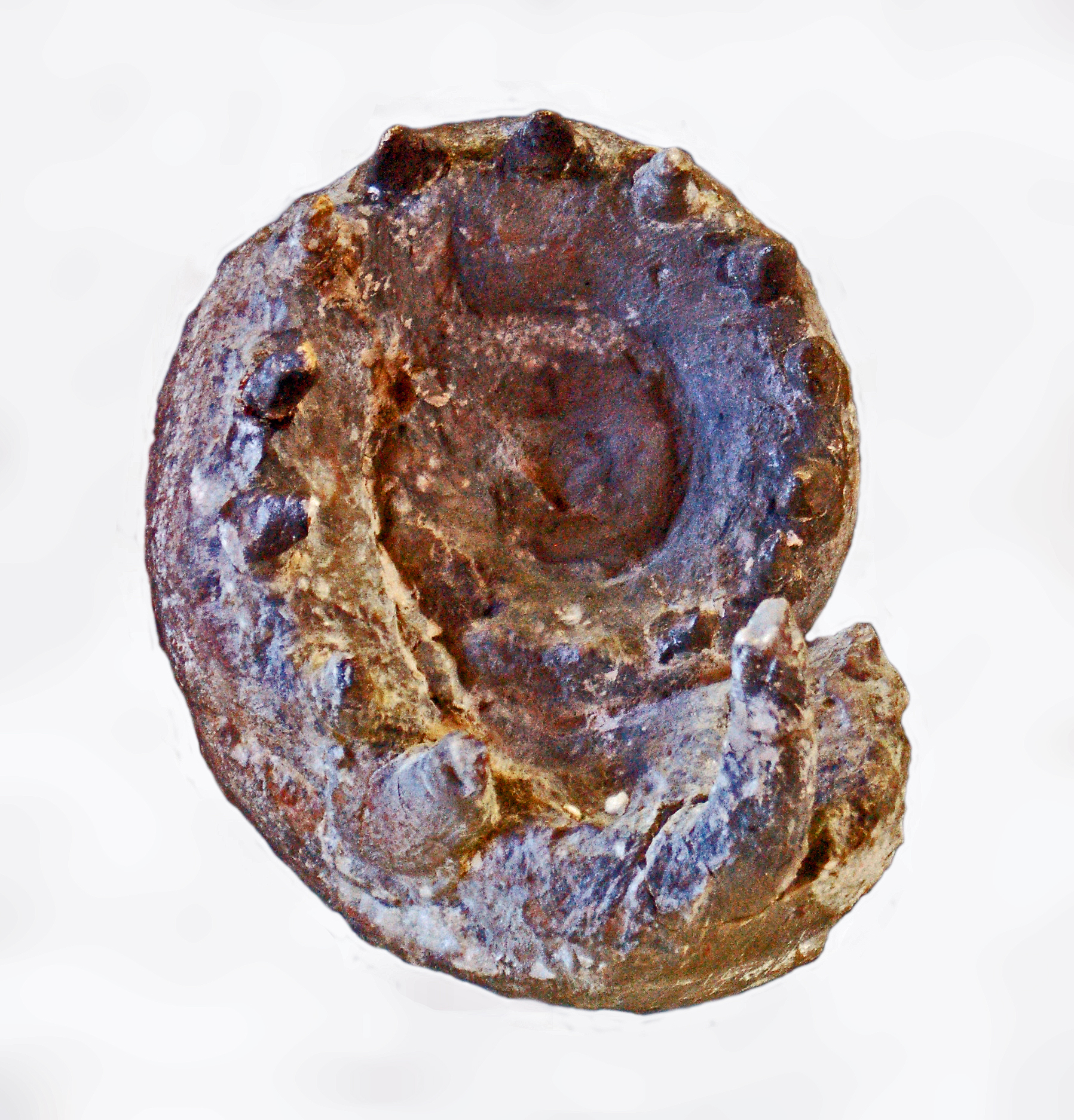
- Hercoceras mirus, Middle Devonian, Prague Basin, Czech Republic, at the National Museum (Prague)

Scientific classification
- Kingdom: Animalia
- Phylum: Mollusca
- Class: Cephalopoda
- Subclass: Nautiloidea
- Order: Nautilida
- Family: †Rutoceratidae
- Genus: †Hercoceras; Barrande, 1865

= Hercoceras =

Extinct genus of molluscs

Hercoceras is a genus of trochoidally coiled nautiloid cephalopods placed in the nautilid family Rutoceratidae. These cephalopod lived i in the Eifelian age of the middle Devonian Period, which occurred 398-391 million years ago. Their shells have prominent lateral outgrowths in the form of spines and a high intraspecific variability.

== Systematic ==
The Paleobiology database places Hercoceras in the family Rutoceratidae in the order Nautilida, but according to some authors it should not be considered an early nautilid. They place this genus in the family Hercoceratidae in the superfamily Rutoceratoidea in the order Oncocerida.

== Species ==
- Hercoceras mirum Barrande
- Hercoceras transiens Barrande
