= Rutocerina =

Rutocerina Temporal range: Devonian - L Permian

Scientific classification
- Kingdom: Animalia
- Phylum: Mollusca
- Class: Cephalopoda
- Subclass: Nautiloidea
- Order: Nautilida
- Suborder: †Rutocerina (Shinskiy 1957)

Suborder of nautiloids

The Rutocertina is one of only three suborders in Shimankiy's (1957) classification of the Nautilida, the other two being the Lirocerina and Nautilina. Genera in the Rutocerina are redistributed (Kümmel 1964) in the Rutoceratina, Tainoceratina, and Centroceratina. The Lirocerina is redefined as the Liroceratina, and Nautilina.remains as is. In general terms these are similar to the simpler classification proposed by Kümmel 1964, wherein the Nautilida is divided into five superfamilies, the Tainocerataceae, Trigonocerataceae, Clydonautilacea, Aipocerataceae, and Nautilaceae. Shimanskiy's classification involves 34 families, Kümmel's only twenty-seven.

The Rutoceratina (Shmanskiy 1957) is divided into two unequal superfamilies which do not correspond with the superfamilies of Kümmel, 1964. They are the Rutoceratacea and the Solenochilaceae.

The Rutoceratacea is essentially the Rutoceratidae of Kümmel 1964, elevated and expanded to contain two families, the Rutoceratidae in the Devonian, and the Neptunoceratidae in the late Carboniferous.

The Solenochilaceae is more or less equivalent to Kümmel's Aipocerataceae

== Description ==
Based on descriptions of the Rutoceratidae and Aipocerataceae in Kümmel 1964, the Rutoceratina are characterized as having longiconic, curved, and coiled shells which develop solid, hollow, and spoutlike wings, frills, and spines; the siphuncle being ventral, mostly orthochoanitic and empty, but in some the septal necks may be long ventrally and recumbent dorsally.

== Range ==
The Rutoceratina lived during the Devonian, Carboniferous, and early Permian, derived from the Oncocerida. They gave rise (Shimanskiy) through the Rutoceratidae in the Devonian to the Tainoceratina and the Centroceratina and through a family of the Solenochilaceae at the end of the Devonian to the Liroceratina.

== Taxonomy ==
- Nautilida (Nautiloidea, Cephalopoda)
  - Rutoceratina
    - Rutocerataceae
      - Rutoceratidae
      - Neptunoceratidae
    - Solenochilaceae
      - Solenochilidae
      - Litogyroceratidae
      - Scyphoceratidae
      - Dentoceratidae
