= Homaloceras =

Homaloceras Temporal range: M Devonian

Scientific classification
- Domain: Eukaryota
- Kingdom: Animalia
- Phylum: Mollusca
- Class: Cephalopoda
- Subclass: Nautiloidea
- Order: Nautilida
- Family: †Centroceratidae
- Genus: †Homaloceras; Whiteavus (1891)

Extinct genus of nautiloids

Homaloceras is an extinct nautiloid cephalopod from the Middle Devonian with a strongly curved shell, included in the nautilid family Centroceratidae.

Homaloceras is characterized by a smooth, exogastrically curved and laterally compressed, cyrtoconic to gyroconic, shell with the ventral margin the outer rim. The venter is narrow and concave with a groove running down the middle; the dorsum on the inner rim, rounded; the sides broadly convex and convergent. The suture is only slightly sinuous, the siphuncle tubular and near the venter. (Kummel 1964)

Homaloceras, named by Whiteavus in 1891, and found in North America, in Canada, is the most primitive and one of the earliest genera assigned to the Centroceratidae. (Kummel 1964)

The Nautiloidea, in which Homaloceras is included, is a subclass of once diverse and numerous shelled cephalopods characterized by a retrochoantic siphuncle in which the septal necks point back toward the apex.

== See also ==
- List of nautiloids
