= Tetragonoceras =

Tetragonoceras Temporal range: Middle Devonian

Scientific classification
- Domain: Eukaryota
- Kingdom: Animalia
- Phylum: Mollusca
- Class: Cephalopoda
- Subclass: Nautiloidea
- Order: Nautilida
- Family: †Tetragonoceratidae
- Genus: †Tetragonoceras; Whiteaves, 1891

Extinct genus of nautiloids

Tetragonoceras is an extinct prehistoric nautiloid genus from the nautilid family Tetragonoceratidae that lived during the Middle Devonian, found in Canada.

Tetragonoceras has an openly spiralled, gyroconic shell with an almost square cross section, but with the venter on the outer rim broader than the dorsum on the inner. The sides are flattish and converge slightly on the dorsum and the ventro-lateral shoulders are angular. The suture of Tetragonoceras has slight lateral and ventral lobes separated by subangular saddles. The siphuncle is ventral and tubular. (Kummel 1964.). A member of the Tetragonoceratidae, Tetragonoceras is also a component of the superfamily Tainocerataceae.
