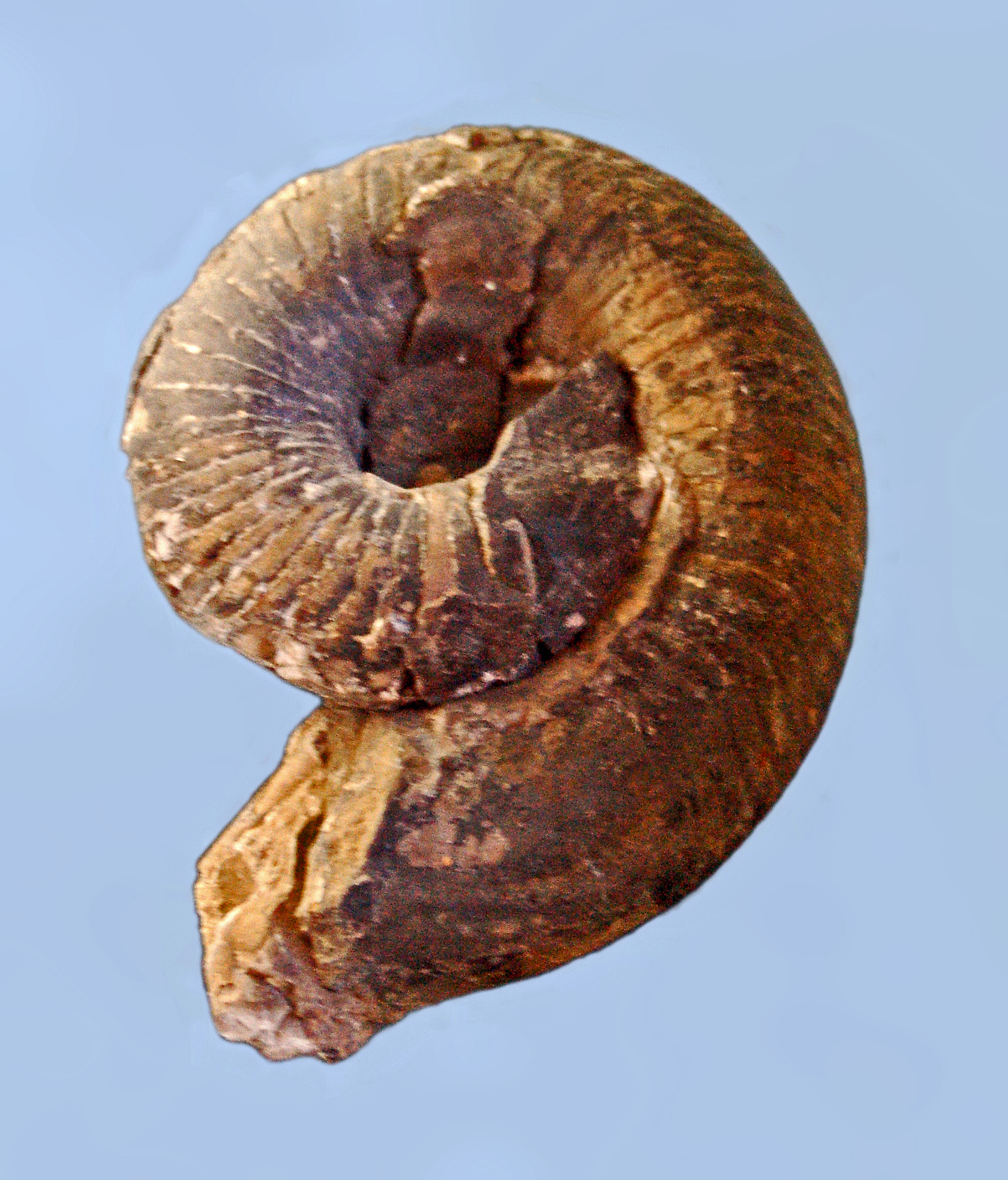
- Trochoceras regale, from Lochkov, Czech Republic, at National Museum (Prague)

Scientific classification
- Kingdom: Animalia
- Phylum: Mollusca
- Class: Cephalopoda
- Subclass: Nautiloidea
- Order: Nautilida
- Family: †Rutoceratidae
- Genus: †Trochoceras; Barrande, 1848

= Trochoceras =

Extinct genus of molluscs

Trochoceras is a genus of trochoidally coiled nautiloid cephalopods placed in the nautilid family Rutoceratidae that lived during the Middle and Late Devonian in what is now central Europe.

The Trochoceras shell is a narrow, smooth, offset gyrocone consisting of little more than a single whorl, trochoidally grown in the sense of left hand screw. The phragmocone, with chambers, is ovate in cross section; the body or living chamber, quadrangular, with two pairs of winglike processes, one at the aperture and one at its base. The siphuncle is ventral, segments fusiform.

Trochoceras resembles the rutoceratid Ptenoceras except the latter has a planar gyroconic shell with narrow projections extending laterally from the body chamber.

== Species ==
- Trochoceras regale Barrande, 1848
- Trochoceras davidsoni Barrande
- Trochoceras baeri
- Trochoceras mccharlesi
