= Grypoceratoidea =

Grypoceratoidea Temporal range: Early Carboniferous - Late Permian (Viséan - Changhsingian)

Scientific classification
- Kingdom: Animalia
- Phylum: Mollusca
- Class: Cephalopoda
- Subclass: Nautiloidea
- Order: Nautilida
- Suborder: †Domatoceratina
- Superfamily: †Grypoceratoidea; Hyatt, 1900

Families
- See text

Extinct superfamily of cephalopods

Grypoceratoidea is an extinct superfamily of cephalopod molluscs in the suborder Domatoceratina. Members are known from the Early Carboniferous to the Late Permian.

== Families ==
- †Domatoceratidae Miller and Youngquist, 1949
- †Ocunautilidae Korn and Hairapetian, 2025
- †Stenopoceratidae Korn, 2025
