= Tainoceratina =

Tainoceratina Temporal range: U Dev-U Trias

Scientific classification
- Kingdom: Animalia
- Phylum: Mollusca
- Class: Cephalopoda
- Subclass: Nautiloidea
- Order: Nautilida
- Suborder: †Tainoceratina; Shimanskiy in Kummel 1964

Suborder of nautiloids

For a further discussion of this group as in use today, see the superfamily Tainocerataceae

The Tainoceratina is a suborder within the Nautilida (Kümmel 1964) created by Shimanskiy on the assumption that the initial, or embryonic, whorl was the critical phylogenetic indicator, which resulted in combining otherwise unrelated and separating obviously related forms. The Tainoceratina rearranges the precedented Tainocerataceae while excluding the ancestral Rutoceratidae.

Three families, the Tainoceratidae, Tetragonoceratidae, and Rhiphaeoceratidae are in common with the Tainocerataeae, but with somewhat different meaning and content. Six additional families used in the Tainoceratina, the Actubonautilidae, Encoiloceratidae, Gzheloceratidae, Mosquoceratidae, Pleuronautilidae, and Temnocheilidae result from mixing genera from this family and that and redefining established families. None of these latter six are in common usage today.

The Encoiloceratidae, Gzheloceratidae, Mosquoceratidae, and Pleuronautilidae are found in the Tainoceratidae; the Temnocheilidae in the Koninckioceratidae, and the Actubonautilidae in the Rhiphaeoceratidae. According to Kümmel (1964) the Pleuronautilidae might be considered a subfamily within the Tainoceratidae, which would include, Encoiloceras, the only genus in the Encoiloceratidae.

The Tainoceratina differs conceptually from the Tainocerataceae in that the Tetragonoceratidae is the ancestral family, derived from the Rutocerida rather than being an offshoot from the Rutoceratidae and that the various families included within are combined in unique superfamilies.
