= Strophiceras =

Strophiceras Temporal range: M Devonian

Scientific classification
- Domain: Eukaryota
- Kingdom: Animalia
- Phylum: Mollusca
- Class: Cephalopoda
- Subclass: Nautiloidea
- Order: Nautilida
- Family: †Centroceratidae
- Genus: †Strophiceras; Hyatt (1844)

Extinct genus of molluscs

Strophiceras is an extinct genus of cephalopods from the Order Nautilida, which includes, in a separate family, Nautilus and Allonautilus.

Strophioceras, a gyrogonic form that comes from the Middle Devonian of Europe and named by Hyatt in 1844 is part of the Trigonoceratacean family Centroceratidae which was extant from the Devonian to the Early Permian. (Kummel 1954. Flower 1950)

== See also ==
- Nautiloidea
- Nautilida
  - List of nautiloids
