= Diademoceras =

Diademoceras Temporal range: Middle Devonian

Scientific classification
- Kingdom: Animalia
- Phylum: Mollusca
- Class: Cephalopoda
- Subclass: Nautiloidea
- Order: Nautilida
- Family: †Rutoceratidae
- Genus: †Diademoceras; Flower, 1945

Extinct genus of molluscs

Diademoceras is a genus of nautiloid cephalopods from the middle Devonian of North America, named by Rousseau Flower in 1945. The genus is a tainoceratacean included in the nautilid family Rutoceratidae.

The shell of Diademoceras is gyroconic, of no more than two whorls, coiled such that whorls do not touch. Whorls are broad, section depressed, sides converge ventrally meeting at a well developed keel. Ornamentation consists of a series of spines on either side as well as transverse striae which form a well developed hyponomic sinus (for the funnel) on the venter. Sutures are straight across the venter, but form a broad shallow lobe on the dorsum. The siphuncle is close to the venter, composed of straight and empty segments, i.e. orthochoanitic.
