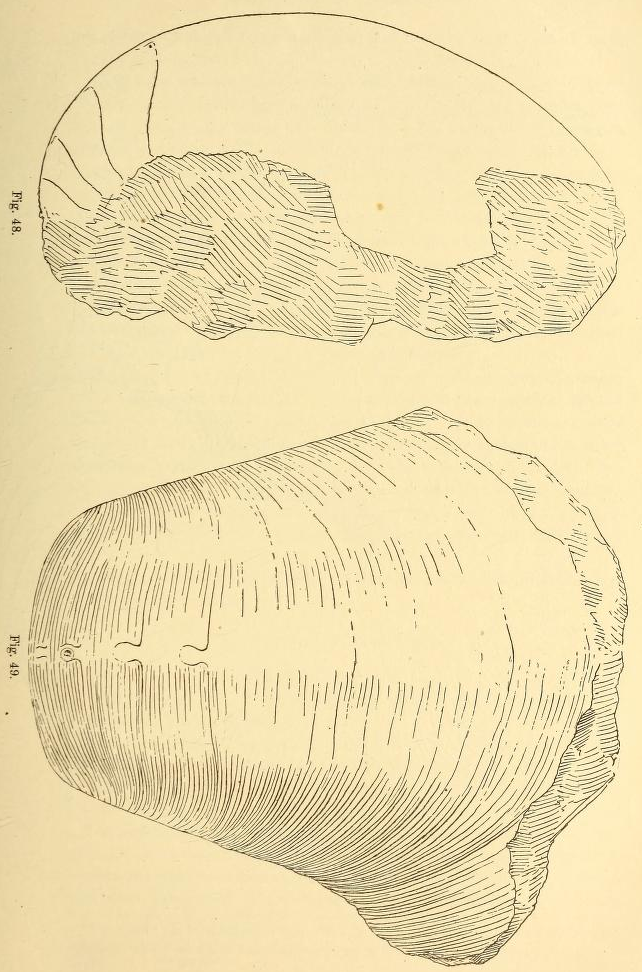
- Asymptoceras newloni

Scientific classification
- Kingdom: Animalia
- Phylum: Mollusca
- Class: Cephalopoda
- Subclass: Nautiloidea
- Order: Nautilida
- Superfamily: †Aipoceratoidea
- Family: †Aipoceratidae; Hyatt 1883

= Aipoceratidae =

Aipoceratidae Temporal range: Carboniferous

Extinct family of molluscs

The Aipoceratidae are a small family of Carboniferous nautilids which have smooth shells and loosely coiled to faintly impressed whorls and in which the aperture may be modified at maturity. The Aipoceratidae include the Lower Carboniferous Aipoceras and Asymptoceras, and Librovitschiceras from the Upper Carboniferous. The Solenochilidae are closely related.
