= Domatoceratina =

Domatoceratina Temporal range: Early Carboniferous - Late Permian (Viséan - Changhsingian)

Scientific classification
- Kingdom: Animalia
- Phylum: Mollusca
- Class: Cephalopoda
- Subclass: Nautiloidea
- Order: Nautilida
- Suborder: †Domatoceratina; Korn, 2025

Superfamilies
- See text

Extinct suborder of cephalopods

Domatoceratina is an extinct suborder of cephalopod molluscs in the order Nautilida. Members are known from the Early Carboniferous to the Late Permian.

== Superfamilies ==
- †Grypoceratoidea Hyatt, 1900
- †Permoceratoidea Miller and Collinson, 1953
- †Subclymenioidea Shimansky, 1962
