= Adelphoceras =

Adelphoceras Temporal range: mid Devonian

Scientific classification
- Domain: Eukaryota
- Kingdom: Animalia
- Phylum: Mollusca
- Class: Cephalopoda
- Subclass: Nautiloidea
- Order: Nautilida
- Family: †Rutoceratidae
- Genus: †Adelphoceras; Barrande, 1870

Extinct genus of molluscs

Adelphoceras is a genus of middle Devonian coiled nautiloids from Europe with an oval whorl section and shallow depressed zone on the inner, dorsal, rim; a strongly contracted T-shaped aperture; ventral siphuncle containing actinosiphonate deposits, and two rows of spines on either side.

Adelphoceras is included in the nautilid family Rutoceratidae, and is also a part of the Tainoceratoidea.
