= Centroceratidae =

Centroceratidae Temporal range: Middle Devonian–Late Permian

Scientific classification
- Domain: Eukaryota
- Kingdom: Animalia
- Phylum: Mollusca
- Class: Cephalopoda
- Subclass: Nautiloidea
- Order: Nautilida
- Superfamily: †Trigonoceratoidea
- Family: †Centroceratidae; Hyatt in Zittel, 1900

Genera
- See text

Extinct family of molluscs

The Centroceratidae is the ancestral family of the Trigonoceratoidea and of the equivalent Centroceratina; extinct shelled cephalopods belonging to the order Nautilida

== Diagnosis ==
The Centroceratidae, which range from the Middle Devonian to the Lower Permian, are characterized by gyroconic, evolute tarphyceraconic, and involute nautiliconic shells with compressed whorls, typically with a quadrangular whorl section in which the flanks converge on venter that is much narrower than the dorsum and ventral and umbilical shoulders are sharply angular, or rarely rounded. In some, e.g. Centroceras, the flanks are divided by a ridge that runs along the middle. Sutures have ventral and lateral lobes but are transverse dorsally. The siphuncle is tubular and close to but not on in contact with the venter (Kummel 1964).

== Phylogeny and genera ==
=== Evolutionary sequence ===
The Centroceratidae are thought probably to be derived from the rutoceratid stock (Flower 1950, 1988, Kummel 1964) Earliest are Centroceras, Homaloceras, and Strophiceras from the Middle Devonian; Centroceras and Homaloceras from North America, Strophiceras from Europe. Next is Carlloceras from the Upper Devonian of North America, followed by Diorugoceras from the Lower Carboniferous of Europe. Last is Phacoceras, found in the Lower Carboniferous of Europe and Lower Permian of Australia. (Kummel 1964)

=== Generic descriptions ===
Homaloceras is the most primitive, with a laterally compressed, cyrtoconic to gyroconic shell with a narrow, concave venter, broadly convex flanks, and rounded dorsum, The suture is only slightly sinuous, the siphuncle tubular and near the venter.

Centroceras, the type genus, is evolute with only a few, rapidly expanding whorls and wide, perforate umbilicus. The cross section may be faintly hexagonal from the effect of a median ridge on either flank, otherwise is tetragonal. Flanks converge from a broad dorsum to a narrow, barely convex venter. Ventral and umblical shoulders are sharp. The suture is with a shallow ventral lobe and broad lateral lobes with subacute saddles on the shoulders; the siphuncle is tubular, near the venter; the living chamber half a volution in length. The surface is covered with alternating striae and lirae; fine, parallel "scratches" and "wires"

Strophiceras has a probably gyroconic shell with a higher than wide, compressed, subrectangular whorl section with slightly arched dorsum and venter and flattened flanks. The venter has a median ridge aligned with diagonally elongated nodes. The suture is with ventral and dorsal lobes, the siphuncle very close to the venter.

Carlloceras has a moderately involute shell with a compressed trapezoidal whorl section, nearly flat ventral and lateral areas, and slight dorsal impression. The suture has a ventral saddle and broad lateral lobe and the siphuncle is small and near the venter.

Diorugoceras is very involute and smooth, with a compressed whorl section with broad, slightly convex flanks that converge toward a concave venter. Ventral shoulders are angular, umbilical shoulders broadly rounded. The suture is with broad, deep lateral lobes, the nature of the ventral and lateral lobes is unknown, as is the position of the siphuncle.

Phacoceras as a moderately involute, highly compressed, smooth, lenticular shell with an acute venter and widest at the umbilical shoulder; suture with ventral saddle and broad shallow lobes on flanks; siphuncle slightly ventral from center.

Genera in ascending stratigraphic order, descriptions from Kummel 1964. p K432 in the Treatise Part K.
