= Solenochilidae =

Solenochilidae Temporal range: Late Mississippian - Early Permian

Scientific classification
- Domain: Eukaryota
- Kingdom: Animalia
- Phylum: Mollusca
- Class: Cephalopoda
- Subclass: Nautiloidea
- Order: Nautilida
- Superfamily: †Aipoceratoidea
- Family: †Solenochilidae; Hyatt, 1883

Family of molluscs

Solenochilidae is a small family of Carboniferous and Early Permian nautilids, similar and related to the Aipoceratidae that comprises genera with whorls in contact and which develop laterally projecting umbilical spines by maturity. The included genera Solenochilus and Acanthonautilus are quite similar in external form but differ in their siphuncles. Those of Solenochilus have more strongly inflated siphuncle segments and more tightly curved septal necks.
