= Halloceras =

Halloceras Temporal range: 391.9–388.1 Ma

Scientific classification
- Domain: Eukaryota
- Kingdom: Animalia
- Phylum: Mollusca
- Class: Cephalopoda
- Subclass: Nautiloidea
- Order: Nautilida
- Family: †Rutoceratidae
- Genus: †Halloceras; Hyatt, 1884

Genus of nautiloids

Halloceras is a gyroconic rutoceratid from the Lower Devonian of North America, with a subtriangular whorl section, narrow dorsum (on the inner side), divergent flanks, and broad, rounded venter (on the outer side), frills at various growth points, suture with shallow ventral and lateral lobes, and a small siphuncle near the venter.

Halloceras was named by Hyatt in 1884. The type us Halloceras undulatum.
