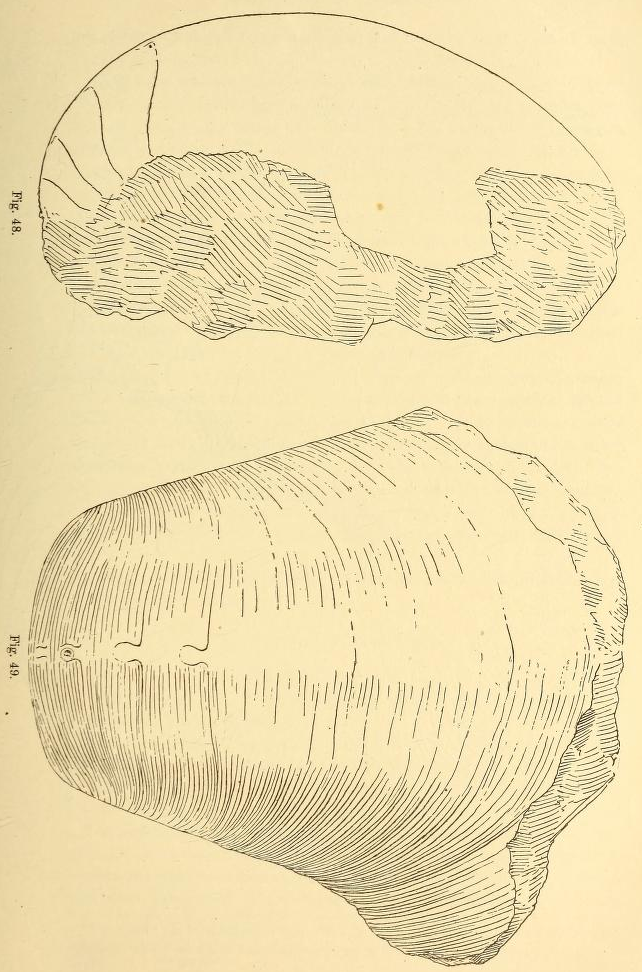
- Asymptoceras newloni

Scientific classification
- Kingdom: Animalia
- Phylum: Mollusca
- Class: Cephalopoda
- Subclass: Nautiloidea
- Order: Nautilida
- Family: †Aipoceratidae
- Genus: †Asymptoceras; Ryckholt, 1852

Species
- †A. pyxis Shimanskiy, 1967; †A. tschernovi Shimanskiy, 1990

= Asymptoceras =

Asymptoceras Temporal range: Mississippian

Extinct genus of nautiloids

Asymptoceras is a genus of aipoceratids (Nautiloidea) similar to Aipoceras but tightly coiled and with only part of the body chamber divergent from the previous whorl. Shell evolute, expanding fairly rapidly; umbilicus open, perforate; whorl section ovoid to subquadrate.

Asymptoceras is known from Mississippian (Lower Carboniferous) sediments in Europe and North America.
