= Koninckioceratidae =

Koninckioceratidae Temporal range: Devonian – Permian

Scientific classification
- Domain: Eukaryota
- Kingdom: Animalia
- Phylum: Mollusca
- Class: Cephalopoda
- Subclass: Nautiloidea
- Order: Nautilida
- Superfamily: †Tainoceratoidea
- Family: †Koninckioceratidae; Hyatt in Zittel, 1900

Extinct family of nautiloids

Koninckioceratidae is a family of nautilid genera, typically with more or less evolute shells with depressed whorl sections, that are combined as a family within the Tainocerataceae. As perceived, the Koninckioceratidae contains 11 genera and lasted from the Early Mississippian to about the end of the Permian.

Koninckioceratidae was established by Hyatt in Zittel, 1900, to include Edaphoceras, Endolobus, Foordiceras, Lophoceras, and Temnocheilus, with Knightoceras, Milkoninckioceras, Subvestinautilus, and Valhallites since added by Kummel (1964)

The Konnckioceratidae is essentially a Mississippian (L Carb) family with only four of the nine genera found in Mississippian age rocks extending as far as the Permian and one reaching only into the Pennsylvanian (U Carb). Only two genera are known exclusively from post Mississippian formations, Knightoceras from Middle Pennsylvania and Foordiceras from Permian. This is opposite from the development of the Tainoceratidae in which the number of genera expands in the Permian and Triassic from a more feeble beginning rather than diminishes.

Genera, listed by earliest known age, are:

- Edaphoceras Miss. N Am.
- Lophoceras Miss. Eu
- Subvestinautilus Miss. Eu
- Tylodiscoceras Dev.-Miss. N Am.
- Planetoceras Miss.-Penn. N Am, Eu
- Endolobus Miss.-Perm. N Am, Eu, Asia
- Milkoninckioceras Miss.-Perm. N Am, Eu
- Temnocheilus Miss.-Perm. N Am, Eu
- Valhallites Miss.-Perm. N Am, Asia
- Knightoceras Penn. N Am, Eu
- Foordiceras Perm. Eu, Asia
