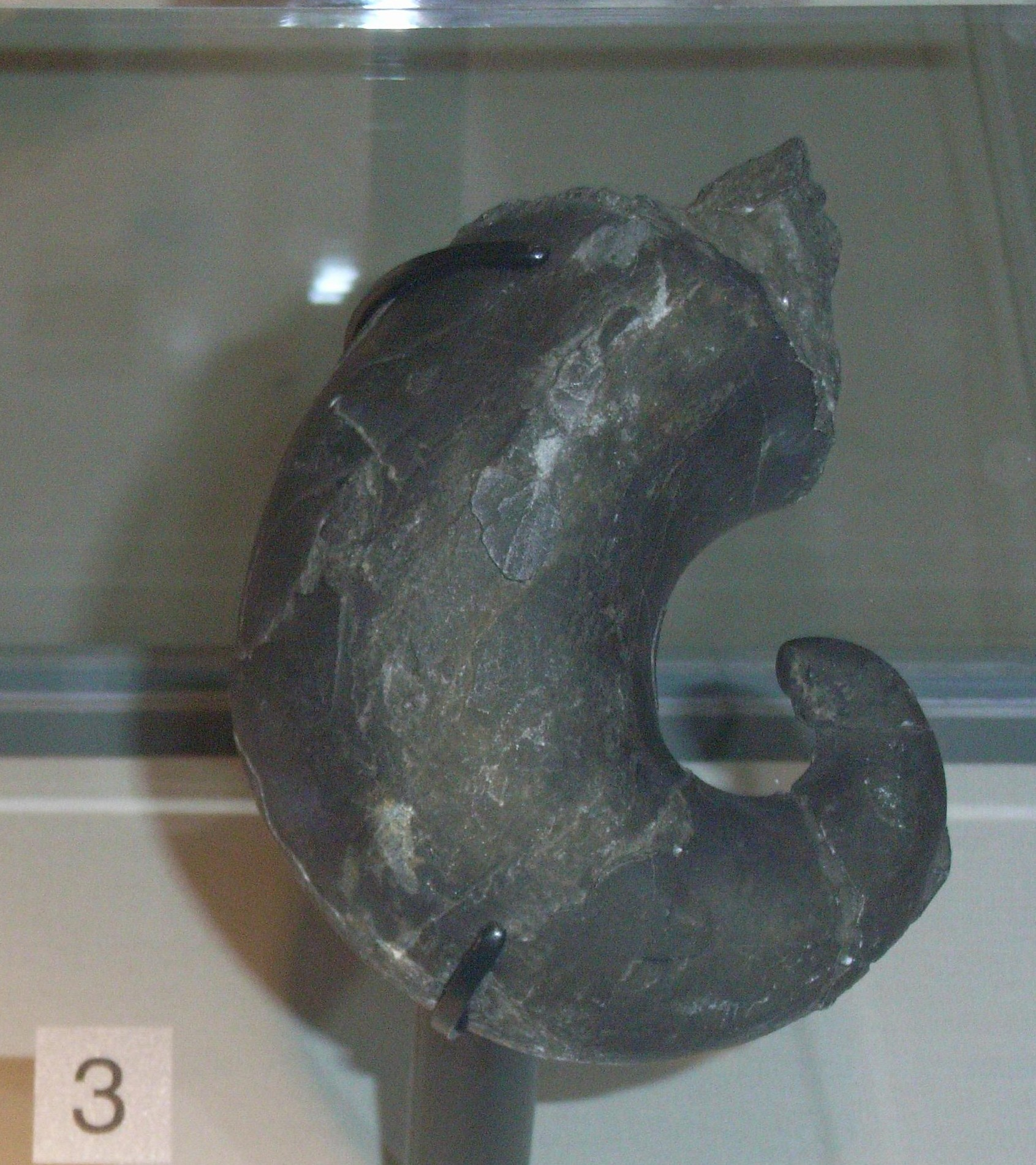
- Aipoceras

Scientific classification
- Kingdom: Animalia
- Phylum: Mollusca
- Class: Cephalopoda
- Subclass: Nautiloidea
- Order: Nautilida
- Superfamily: †Aipoceratoidea; Hyatt (1883)

Families
- Aipoceratidae Solenochilidae Scyphoceratidae

Synonyms
- Aipocerataceae

= Aipoceratoidea =

Aipoceratoidea Temporal range: Lower Carboniferous–Lower Permian

Extinct superfamily of molluscs

The Aipoceratoidea are a superfamily within the order Nautilida characterized by rapidly expanding, smooth to ribbed, cyrtoconic to coiled shells with rounded or sometimes dorsally flattened or impressed whorls, nearly straight sutures, and a ventral and marginal siphuncle. Septal necks are orthochoanitic ventrally and orthochoanitic or cyrtochoanitic dorsally.

The Aipoceratoidea are the Solenochilida according to Flower and are the Solenocheilaceae which Shimansky included in his Rutoceratina minus the Litogyroceratidae which the Treatise includes in the Rutoceratidae (Tainocerataceae)

The Aipoceratoidea include three families and at least nine genera. The families are the Aipoceratidae, Solenochilidae, and Scyphoceratidae. The Aipoceratidae are represented by the loosely coiled, compressed and gyroconic Aipoceras from the Lower Carboniferous (Mississippian) of Europe and North America; the Solenochilidae are represented by the tightly coiled cosmopolitan Solenochilis from the Upper Carboniferous (Pennsylvanian) to the Lower Permian, with spines projecting straight out laterally from the umbilical region; and the Scyphoceratidae are represented by Scyphoceras from the Lower Permian of the Ural Mountains, which has a ribbed shell and a relatively small and sharply curved phragmocone.

The derivation of the Aipoceratoidea is somewhat tenuous. Kummel (1964, K385 fig. 280) shows a tentative connection to the Rutoceratidae in the Devonian. Flower also shows a tentative connection but from the equivalent Solenochilida to the Barrndeocerida. Shimansky, though, shows a direct connection from the Solenocheilaceae to the Rutoceratidae.
