= Solenochilus =

Solenochilus Temporal range: LPenn --L Perm

Scientific classification
- Domain: Eukaryota
- Kingdom: Animalia
- Phylum: Mollusca
- Class: Cephalopoda
- Subclass: Nautiloidea
- Order: Nautilida
- Family: †Solenochilidae
- Genus: †Solenochilus; Meek and Worthen 1870

Extinct genus of nautiloids

Solenochilus, type genus of the Solenochilidae is an extinct cosmopotilian nautilid from the Lower Pennsylvanian to the Lower Permian with a rapidly expanding, coiled globular shell with few whorls, from which prominent spines extend laterally from the umbilical area at maturity. Solenochilus is derived from the Upper Mississippian Acanthonautilus, principally through evolutionary changes in the siphuncle.

The siphuncle in both Solenochilus and Acanthonautilus is ventral, running just inside the outer rim of the shell. In both the siphuncle is mostly composed of thin connecting rings. The siphuncle in Solenochilus is wider and has a more sinuous profile than that of Acanthonautilus. Both swing dorsally between septa, but more so in Solenochilus. In both the septal necks are somewhat long and straight on the ventral side but in Solenochilus they are cyrtochoanitic and recumbent on the dorsal side, rather than simply curved back, cyrtochoanitic.

Solenochilus resembles its predecessor, Acanthonautilus', in overall anatomy, and both genera superficially resemble Permonautilus from the Clydonautilaceae.
