= Tetragonoceratidae =

Tetragonoceratidae Temporal range: Middle Devonian

Scientific classification
- Domain: Eukaryota
- Kingdom: Animalia
- Phylum: Mollusca
- Class: Cephalopoda
- Subclass: Nautiloidea
- Order: Nautilida
- Superfamily: †Tainoceratoidea
- Family: †Tetragonoceratidae; Flower, 1945

Extinct family of nautiloids

The Tetragonoceratidae is a small family of nautilitids constituting a part of the superfamily Tainocerataceae in which shells are coiled with a generally quadrate whorl section. Coiling is either gyroconic or evoluute with a slight dorsal impression. Flanks diverge from the umbilical to the ventral shoulders so as to make the whorl sections widest close to the venter. Nodes made develop on the flanks and shoulders. The siphuncle is tubular, typically found near the venter. Sutures are with lateral lobes and may possess dorsal and ventral lobes as well.

The Tetragonoceratidae, which is an early offshoot of the Rutoceratidae, contains three genera (as of 1964), all confined to the Middle Devonian: Tetragonoceras, Nassauoceras, and Wellsoceras.
