= Wellsoceras =

Wellsoceras Temporal range: Middle Devonian

Scientific classification
- Domain: Eukaryota
- Kingdom: Animalia
- Phylum: Mollusca
- Class: Cephalopoda
- Subclass: Nautiloidea
- Order: Nautilida
- Family: †Tetragonoceratidae
- Genus: †Wellsoceras; Flower, 1945

Genus of nautiloids

Wellsoceras is a tetragonoceratid that starts off with an evolute shell in which whorls are in contact, but has a mature living chamber that diverges and becomes free. The whorl section is slightly wider than high and is faintly subquadrangular. Flanks are slightly convex and tend to converge very slightly toward the center. All shoulders are strongly rounded. The suture is straight ventrally or with a slight ventral lobe, well developed lateral lobes, and a broad, low dorsal saddle. The siphuncle is located halfway between the center and the ventral margin.

Wellsoceras has been found in Middle Devonian sediments in eastern North America, in Ohio, Indiana, and Ontario.
