= Acanthonautilus =

Acanthonautilus Temporal range: Upper Mississippian

Scientific classification
- Domain: Eukaryota
- Kingdom: Animalia
- Phylum: Mollusca
- Class: Cephalopoda
- Subclass: Nautiloidea
- Order: Nautilida
- Family: †Solenochilidae
- Genus: †Acanthonautilus; Foord (1896)

Extinct genus of molluscs

Acanthonautilus is an extinct genus in the nautilid family Solenochildae (Aipocerataceae) from the Upper Mississippian of North America and equivalent (uL Carb) strata in Europe, first described by Foord in 1896.

Acanthonautilus, like Solenochilus, has an involute, globular shell of few volutions that enlargens with fair rapidity, with prominent lateral spines extending from the umbilical area at maturity. The siphuncle in Acanthonautilus is narrower than in Solenochilus and not as sinuous. As with Solenochilus, septal necks on the outer, or ventral, side are straight, but those on the inner, or dosal, side rather than being recumbent are simply curved, cyrtochoanitic. Most of the siphuncle is thin connecting ring which from the outside is slightly ventrally concave and slightly dorsally convex between septa.

Acanthonautilus may have been derived from Aipoceras, or possibly Asymptoceras and give rise, principally through modification of the siphuncle, to Solenochilus.
