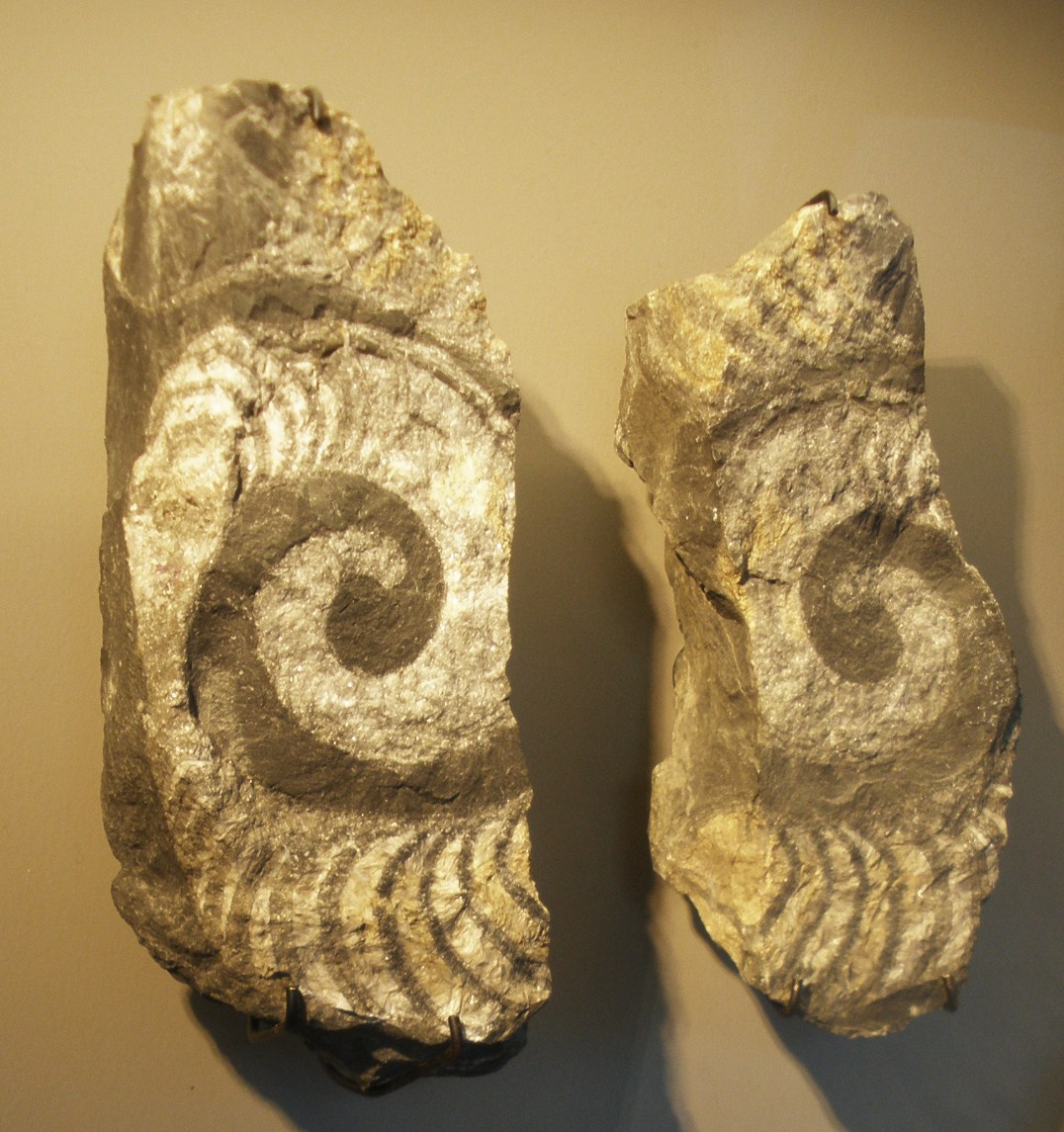
- Hindeoceras

Scientific classification
- Kingdom: Animalia
- Phylum: Mollusca
- Class: Cephalopoda
- Subclass: Nautiloidea
- Order: Nautilida
- Superfamily: †Tainoceratoidea
- Family: †Rutoceratidae; Hyatt, 1884

= Rutoceratidae =

Rutoceratodae Temporal range: 449.5–314.6 Ma

Extinct family of nautiloids

Rutoceratidae is a family of prototypical nautilids, derived probably from either Brevicoceratidae or Acleistoceratidae of the order Oncocerida early in the Devonian. Rutoceratidae comprise a family within the oncocerid superfamily Tainocerataceae They are generally characterized by cyrtoconic and gyroconic shells, commonly with spines, nodes, or frills, although some included genera are almost orthoconic, and a commonly empty, tubular ventral siphuncle.

The Rutocertids lived during the Devonian and Mississippian (early Carboniferous) and are the ancestral stock of Nautilida. Within the superfamily Taintocerataceae, rutoceratids gave rise to the exclusively Devonian family Tetragonoceratidae and near the start of the Mississippian to the family Koninckioceratidae which lasted into the Permian and to Tainoceratidae which lasted through most of the Triassic.

== Genera ==
- Adelphoceras
- Anomaloceras
- Casteroceras
- Centrolitoceras
- Diademoceras
- Duerleyoceras
- Goldringia
- Halloceras
- Hercoceras
- Hindeoceras
- Homoadelphoceras
- Litogyroceras
- Muiroceras
- Pleuroncoceras
- Ptenoceras
- Ptyssoceras
- Roussanoffoceras
- Rutoceras
- Syrreghmatoceras
- Tetranodoceras
- Threaroceras
- Trochoceras
- Tylorthoceras
