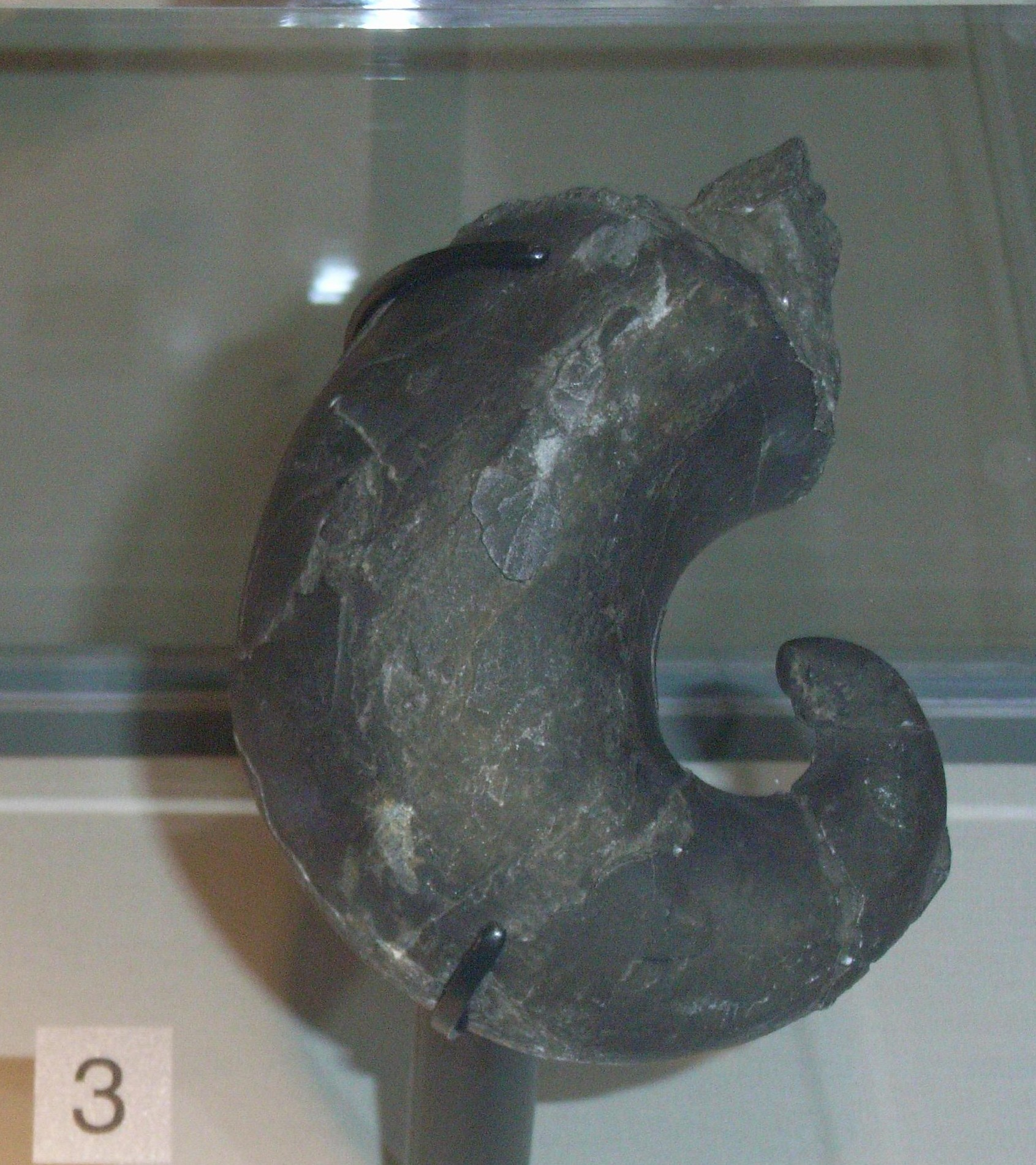

Scientific classification
- Kingdom: Animalia
- Phylum: Mollusca
- Class: Cephalopoda
- Subclass: Nautiloidea
- Order: Nautilida
- Family: †Aipoceratidae
- Genus: †Aipoceras; Hyatt, 1884

= Aipoceras =

Aipoceras Temporal range: Early Mississippian

Genus of molluscs

Aipoceras is a genus of loosely coiled aipoceratid nautiloids with laterally compressed whorls; shells expanding moderately to fairly rapidly with a tendency to uncoil at maturity. Juvenile forms are somewhat cyrtoconic. The apical end forms a hook. Aipoceras has been found in Lower Mississippian strata in the U.S.
