= Tainoceratoidea =

Tainoceratoidea Temporal range: Lower Devonian-Upper Triassic

Scientific classification
- Domain: Eukaryota
- Kingdom: Animalia
- Phylum: Mollusca
- Class: Cephalopoda
- Subclass: Nautiloidea
- Order: Nautilida
- Superfamily: †Tainoceratoidea; Hyatt, 1883

Families
- Koninckioceratidae; Rhiphaeoceratidae; Rutoceratidae; Tainoceratidae; Tetragonoceratidae

Extinct superfamily of nautiloids

The Tainoceratoidea are a superfamily in the cephalopod order Nautilida characterized by straight to loosely coiled shells, generally to a degree such that the width is greater than the height, to quadrate whorl section. Many bore spines, ribs, frills, wings, or nodes. In early forms, the siphuncle is generally near ventral, but more variable (usually central) in advanced forms.

Tainoceratoids are derived from the Oncocerida through the Rutoceratidae which first appear in the Lower Devonian. The Rutoceratidae gave rise to the exclusively Devonian Tetragonoceratidae and early on the Mississippian or late the Devonian to the Tainoceratidae and Koninckioceratidae. The Tainoceratidae gave rise to the Rhiphaeoceratidae which are confined to the Permian.

The Tainoceratoidea, established by Alpheus Hyatt in 1883, are equivalent for most purposes to the suborder Rutoceratina established later by Shimanskiy in 1957.
