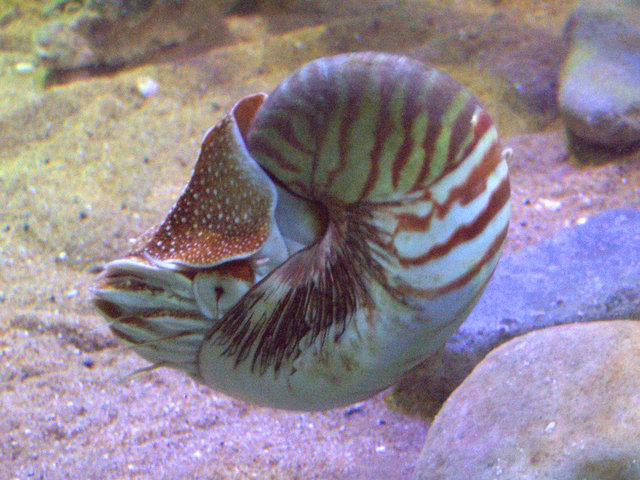
- Nautilus pompilius

Scientific classification
- Kingdom: Animalia
- Phylum: Mollusca
- Class: Cephalopoda
- Subclass: Nautiloidea
- Order: Nautilida; Agassiz, 1847

Type species
- N. pompilius Linnaeus, 1758

Superfamilies
- †Aipoceratoidea; †Clydonautiloidea; †Tainoceratoidea; †Trigonoceratoidea; Nautilaceae

= Nautilida =

Nautilida Temporal range: Devonian–Recent

Order of cephalopods

The Nautilida constitute a large and diverse order of generally coiled nautiloid cephalopods that began in the mid Paleozoic and continues to the present with a single family, the Nautilidae which includes two genera, Nautilus and Allonautilus, with six species. All told, between 22 and 34 families and 165 to 184 genera have been recognised, making this the largest order of the subclass Nautiloidea.

== Classification and phylogeny ==
=== Current classification ===
The current classification of the Nautilida, in prevalent use, is that of Bernhard Kummel in the Treatise which divides the Nautilida into five superfamilies, the Aipoceratoidea, Clydonautiloidea, Tainoceratoidea, and Trigonoceratoidea, mostly of the Paleozoic, and the later Nautilaceae. These include 22 families and some 165 or so genera (Teichert and Moore 1964).

=== Other concepts ===
Shimansky 1962 (in Kummel 1964) divided the Nautilida into five suborders, the mostly Paleozoic Centroceratina, Liroceratina, Rutoceratina, and Tainoceratina, and the Mesozoic to recent Nautilina. These include superfamilies which are different from those of Kummel (1964) and of less extent. The Centroceratina are comparable to the Trigonoceratoidea, the Liroceratina to the Clydonautiloidea, and the Nautilina to the Nautilaceae. The main difference is that the Rutoceratidae are included with the Aipoceratoidea of Kummel (1964) in the Rutoceratina. The remaining Tainoceratoidea are the Tainoceratina.

Rousseau Flower (1950) distinguished the Solenochilida, Rutoceratida, and Centroceratida, as separate orders, from the Nautilida, derived from the Barrandeocerida, which are now abandoned. Within the Nautilida, he placed 10 families, included in the Nautilaceae and the no longer considered ancestral Clydonautiloidea. Teichert's 1988 classification is an abridged version of Shimansky's and Flower's early schemes.

=== Derivation and evolution ===
Both Shimansky and Kummel derive the Nautilida from the Oncocerida with either the Acleistoceratidae or Brevicoceratidae which share some similarities with the Rutoceratidae as the source. The Rutoceratidae are the ancestral family of the Tainoceratoidea and of the Nautilida and of Shimansky's and Teichert's Rutoceratina.

The Tainoceratoidea gave rise, probably through the ancestral Rutoceratidae, to the Trigonoceratoidea and Clydonautiloidea in the Devonian and to the Aipoceratoidea early in the Carboniferous. The Trigonoceratoidea, in turn, gave rise late in the Triassic through the Syringonautilidae to the Nautilaceae, which include the Nautilidae, with Nautilus.

== Diversity and evolutionary history ==
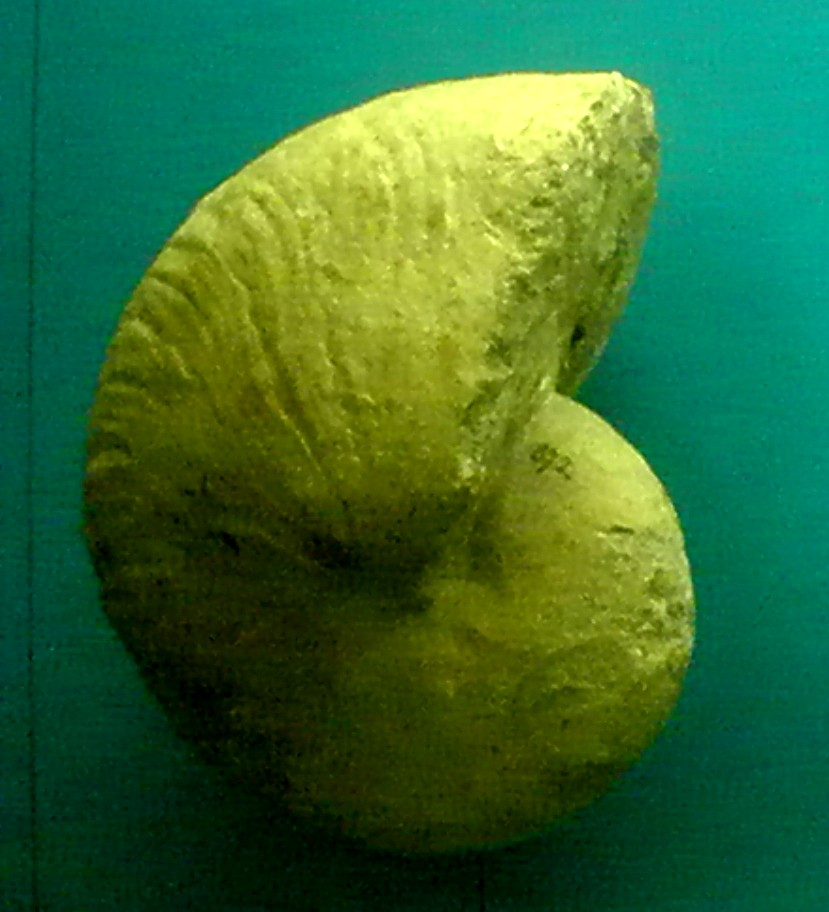
Procymatoceras subtruncatus fossil

The Nautilida are thought to be derived from either of the oncocerid families, Acleistoceratidae or Brevicoceratidae, both of which have the same sort of shells and internal structure as found in the Devonian Rutocerina of Shimanskiy, the earliest true nautilids. Flower (1950) suggested the Nautilida evolved from the Barrandeocerida, an idea he came later to reject in favor of derivation from the Oncocerida. The idea that the Nautilida evolved from straight-shelled ("Orthoceras") nautiloids, as proposed by Otto Schindewolf in 1942, through transitional forms such as the Ordovician Lituites can be rejected out of hand as evolutionarily unlikely. Lituites and the Lituitidae are derived tarphycerids and belong to a separate evolutionary branch of nautilioids.

The number of nautilid genera increased from the Early Devonian to about 22 in the Middle Devonian. During this time, their shells were more varied than those found in species of living Nautilus, ranging from curved (cyrtoconic), through loosely coiled (gyroconic), to tightly coiled forms, represented by the Rutoceratidae, Tetragonoceratidae, and Centroceratidae.

Nautilids declined in the Late Devonian, but again diversified in the Carboniferous, when some 75 genera and subgenera in some 16 families are known to have lived. Although there was considerable diversity in form, curved and loosely coiled shells are rare or absent, except in the superfamily Aipoceratoidea. For the rest, nautilids adapted the standard planispiral shell form, although not all were as tightly coiled as the modern nautilids. There was, however, a great diversity in surface ornamentation, cross section, and so on, with some genera, such as the Permian Cooperoceras and Acanthonautilus, developing large lateral spikes.

Despite again decreasing in diversity in the Permian, nautilids were less affected by the Permian-Triassic extinction than their distant relatives the Ammonoidea. During the Late Triassic there was a tendency in the Clydonautiloidea to develop sutures similar to those of some Late Devonian goniatites. Only a single genus, Cenoceras, with a shell similar to that of the modern nautilus, survived the less severe Triassic extinction, at which time the entire Nautiloidea almost became extinct.

For the remainder of the Mesozoic, nautilids once again flourished, although never at the level of their Paleozoic glory, and 24 genera are known from the Cretaceous. Again, the nautilids were not as affected by the end Cretaceous mass extinction as the ammonoids that became entirely extinct, possibly because their larger eggs were better suited to survive the conditions of that environment-changing event.

Three families and at least five genera of nautilids are known to have survived this crisis in the history of life. There was a further resurgence during the Paleocene and Eocene, with several new genera, the majority of which had a worldwide distribution. During the Late Cretaceous and Early Tertiary, the Hercoglossidae and Aturiidae again developed sutures like those of Devonian goniatites.

Miocene nautilids were still fairly widespread, but today the order includes only two genera, Nautilus and Allonautilus, limited to the southwest Pacific.

The recent decrease in the once worldwide distribution of nautilids is now believed to have been caused by the spread of pinnipeds. From the Oligocene onward, the appearance of pinnipeds in the geological record of a region coincides with the disappearance of nautilids from that region. As a result, nautilids are now limited to their current distribution in the tropical Indo-Pacific ocean, where pinnipeds are absent. The genus Aturia seems to have temporarily survived regions where pinnipeds were present through adaptations to fast and agile swimming, but eventually went extinct as well. Predation by short-snouted whales and the development of OMZs, preventing nautilids from retreating into deeper water, are also cited as other potential causes of extinction.

== Bibliography ==
- Kummel, Bernhard (1964). "Nautiloidea-Nautilida". Treatise on Invertebrate Paleontology, Part K. Mollusca 3. Geological Society of America, and University of Kansas Press. pp. K383–457.
- Moore, Lalicker and Fischer, (1952) Invertebrate Fossils, McGraw-Hill Book Company, Inc., New York, Toronto, London.
