= Nautilina =

Nautilina Temporal range: Late Triassic - Recent

Scientific classification
- Domain: Eukaryota
- Kingdom: Animalia
- Phylum: Mollusca
- Class: Cephalopoda
- Subclass: Nautiloidea
- Order: Nautilida
- Suborder: Nautilina; Shimanskiy, 1957

Families
- Nautilidae †Cymatoceratidae †Hercoglossidae †Aturiidae

Suborder of cephalopods

The Nautilina is the last suborder of the Nautilida and the only nautiloids living since the end of the Triassic. The Nautilina, proposed by Shimanskiy, is basically the Nautilaceae of Kummel, 1964, defined by Furnish and Glenister, but differs in omitting two families, the Paracenoceratidae and Pseudonautilidae which instead are placed in the Liroceratina.

The Nautilina are derived from the Syringonautilidae, a family in the Centroceratina (Trigonocerataceae), in the Late Triassic and consists of four families, the Nautilidae, Cymatoceratidae, Herocoglossidae, and Aturiidae. The Nautilidae, which is the root stock of the suborder, includes the living Nautilus.

The Nautilidae are involute or slightly evolute and generally smooth with straight to sinuous sutures. The Cymatoceratidae, which are the most common of the Cretaceous nautiloids, are strongly ribbed. The Hercoglossidae are smooth but with differentiated sutures, in some with deep lateral lobes and well-developed saddles. The Aturiidae (Aturia) is similar to the Hercoglossidae except for being more discoidal and having a more complex suture and subdorsal siphuncle.

The Nautilidae gave rise to the Cymatoceratidae and Hercoglossidae during the Jurassic while the Herocoglossidae became ancestral to the Aturiidae near the beginning of the Cenozoic. The Cymatoceratidae and Hercoglossidae became extinct near the end of the Paleogene while the Aturiidae reached into the Neogene. Only the Nautilidae remain.
