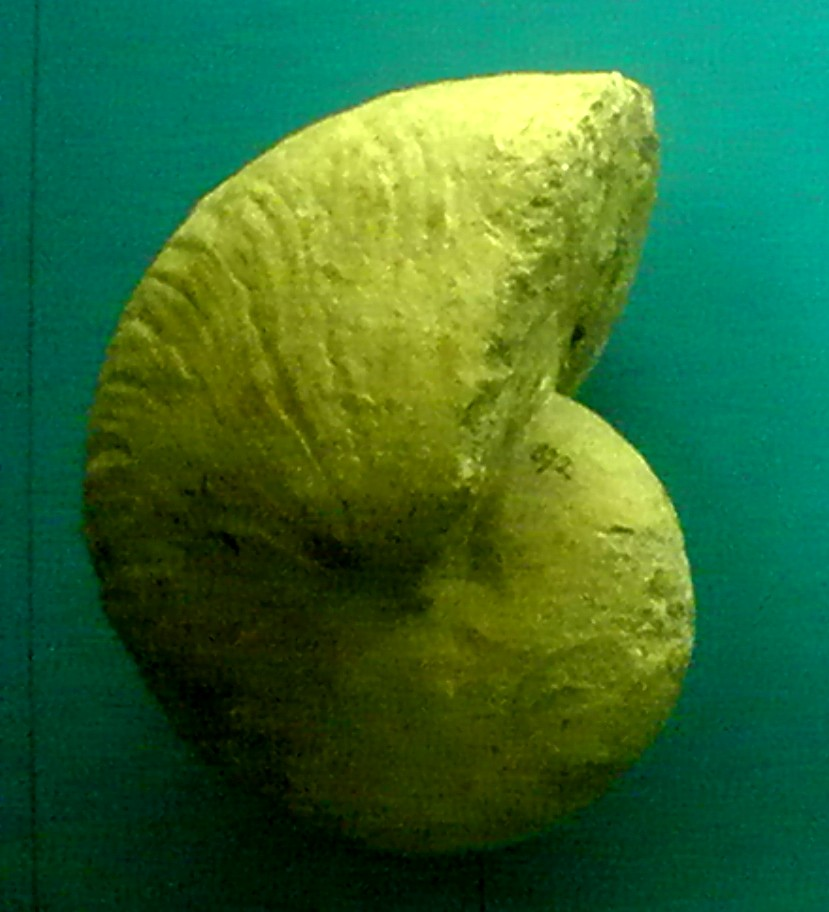
- Fossil of Procymatoceras subtruncatus

Scientific classification
- Domain: Eukaryota
- Kingdom: Animalia
- Phylum: Mollusca
- Class: Cephalopoda
- Subclass: Nautiloidea
- Order: Nautilida
- Family: †Cymatoceratidae
- Genus: †Procymatoceras; Spath, 1927

= Procymatoceras =

Procymatoceras Temporal range: Middle Jurassic

Extinct genus of nautiloids

Procymatoceras is a nautiloid cephalopod from the Middle Jurassic with a large, tightly involute, rapidly expanding shell. Early, inner, whorls are round in cross section. Later, outer, whorls, and mature living chamber are flattened on the sides and venter. Surface covered with sinuous ribs. Sutures have shallow ventral and dorsal lobes. Probably gave rise to Cymatonautilus and is the likely ancestor of Cymatoceras and Paracymatoceras. Procymatoceras has its origin in the earliest Nautilidae, in Cenoceras.
