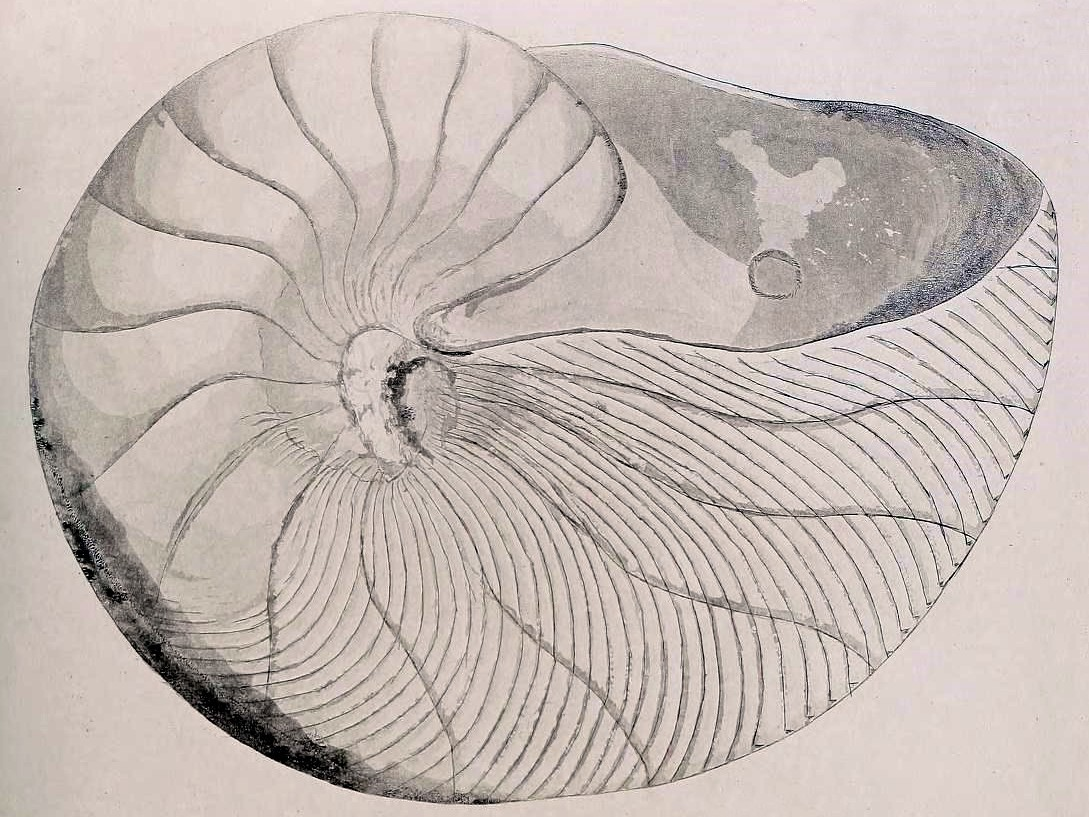

Scientific classification
- Kingdom: Animalia
- Phylum: Mollusca
- Class: Cephalopoda
- Subclass: Nautiloidea
- Order: Nautilida
- Family: †Cymatoceratidae
- Genus: †Cymatoceras
- Species: †C. elegans

Binomial name
- †Cymatoceras elegans Sowerby, 1816

Synonyms
- Nautilus elegans

= Cymatoceras elegans =

Cymatoceras elegans Temporal range: 99.7–94.3 Ma

Extinct species of mollusc

Cymatoceras elegans is an extinct species of nautilitacean cephalopods in the family Cymatoceratidae. It is from the Cretaceous of Switzerland and the United Kingdom.
