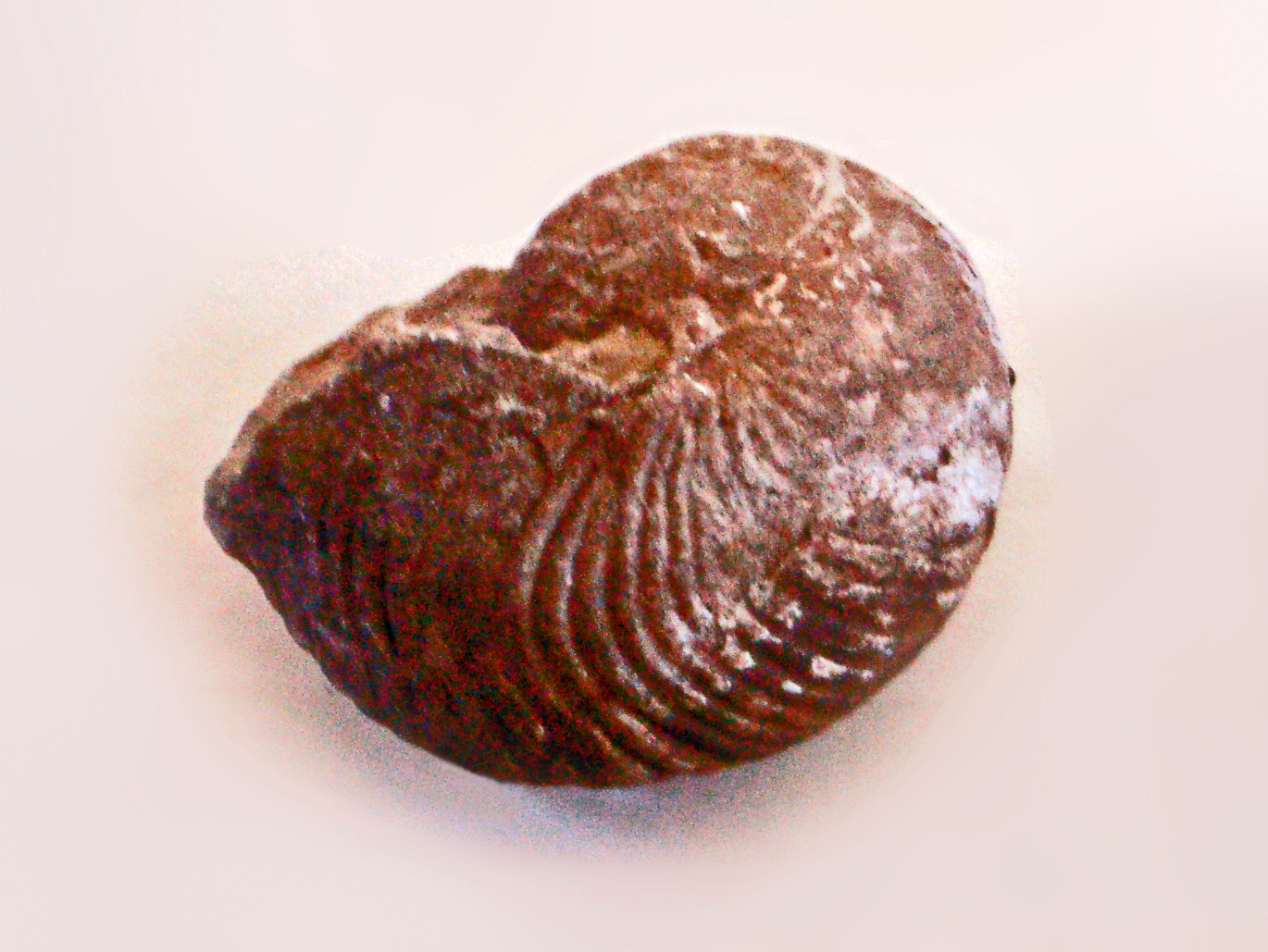
- D. rugatus, from Czech Republic, at the National Museum (Prague)

Scientific classification
- Domain: Eukaryota
- Kingdom: Animalia
- Phylum: Mollusca
- Class: Cephalopoda
- Subclass: Nautiloidea
- Order: Nautilida
- Family: †Cymatoceratidae
- Genus: †Deltocymatoceras; Kummel, 1956

= Deltocymatoceras =

Deltocymatoceras Temporal range: Upper Cretaceous

Extinct genus of nautiloids

Deltocymatoceras is an involute cymatoceratid (Nautilioidea-Nautilida) with broadly arched whorl sides, strongly convergent on a narrow venter that bears a slight, rounded, keel-like ridge, and with no distinct ventro-latera shoulders. Sides bear cymatoceratid ribs that bifurcate near the middle of the whorl sides, but do not cross the venter. The suture has a somewhat pointed ventral saddle, broad lateral lobes (one on each side) and prominent saddles on the umbilical shoulders (again, one per side). The position of the siphuncle in undetermined.

Deltocymatoceras is probably derived form Cymatoceras by a rounding of the ventro-lateral shoulders resulting in a narrowing of the venter, coupled with the development of a pointed ventral saddle. Eucymatoceras from the Lower Cretaceous is similar, except for lacking the vernal keel. Contemporary, Upper Cretaceous Epicymatoceras is involute, discoidal. Deltoidonautiluds with its similar name, and converging sides, belongs to the Hercoglossidae.
