= Somalinautilus =

Somalinautilus Temporal range: Middle Jurassic, Bajocian–Kimmeridgian

Scientific classification
- Domain: Eukaryota
- Kingdom: Animalia
- Phylum: Mollusca
- Class: Cephalopoda
- Subclass: Nautiloidea
- Order: Nautilida
- Family: †Paracenoceratidae
- Genus: †Somalinautilus; Spath, 1927

Species
- S. antiquus (Dacque, 1910) (type species); S. fuscus (Crick, 1898); S. clausus (Foord & Crick, 1890)

Synonyms
- Nautilus antiquus Dacque, 1910; Nautilus bisculatus Dacque, 1905; Nautilus fuscus Crick, 1898; Nautilus clausus Foord & Crick, 1890

Extinct genus of molluscs

Somalinautilus is a genus of nautiloids that is found in the Middle to Upper Jurassic of England, France, and Somaliland. The genus contains three species, S. antiquus, first assigned to Nautilus by Dacque in 1910, S. fuscus, first assigned to Nautilus in 1898, and S. clausus, first used under Nautilus in 1890. Another species of Nautilus was named in 1905, N. bisculatus, which is now a synonym of S. antiquus.

Two features that differentiate Somalinautilus are that the venter is arched and low, and its ventral shoulders are subangular. This distinguishes Somalinautilus from its close relatives Paracenoceras, Tithonoceras, and Aulaconautilus. Tithonoceras is closest related to Paracenoceras within the group, and the three other genera are all descended from the groups sister taxa. In 1927 the family Paracenoceratidae was named to house these four genera, and in 1956, the family was then downgraded to a subfamily within Nautilidae. However, the group is now considered to be a family again.
