= Tithonoceras =

Scientific classification
- Domain: Eukaryota
- Kingdom: Animalia
- Phylum: Mollusca
- Class: Cephalopoda
- Subclass: Nautiloidea
- Order: Nautilida
- Family: †Paracenoceratidae
- Genus: †Tithonoceras; Retowski, 1894

Genus of nautiloids

Tithonoceras is a genus of nautiloid cephalopod from the Upper Jurassic (Thithonian stage) found in the Crimea, belonging to the nautilacean family Paracenoceratidae.

The shell of Tithonoceras is evolute, coiled with all whorls exposed, smooth, and laterally compressed. The whorl section is subquadrangular with a broad, flattened venter on the outer rim. Ventrolateral shoulders are inflated, forming broad, rounded, keels, bordered by broad furrows on the flanks. The suture is sinuous, with ventral and lateral lobes. The position of the siphuncle is unknown.
