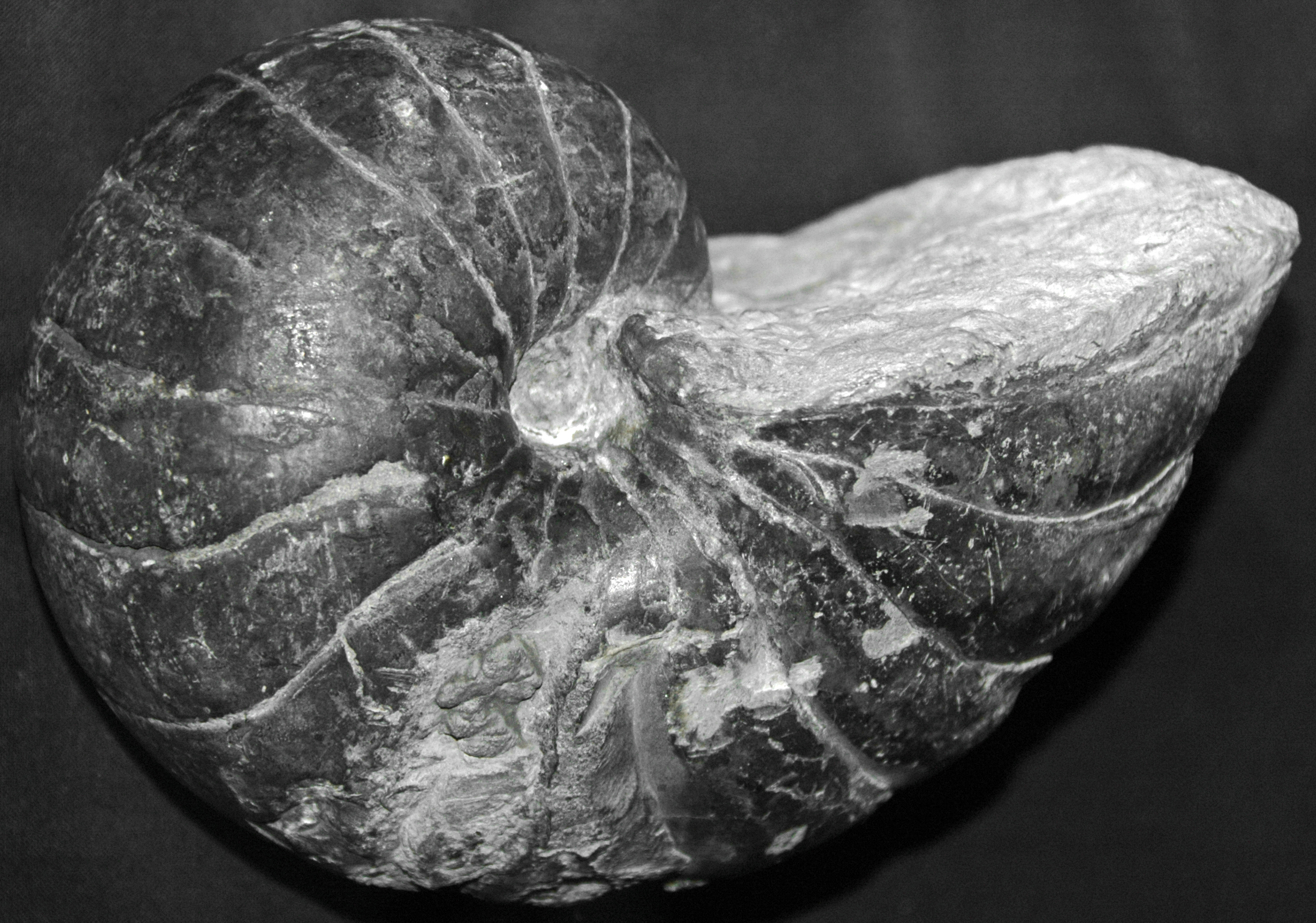
- Fossil in Cincinnati Museum of Natural History & Science

Scientific classification
- Kingdom: Animalia
- Phylum: Mollusca
- Class: Cephalopoda
- Subclass: Nautiloidea
- Order: Nautilida
- Family: Nautilidae
- Genus: †Eutrephoceras; Hyatt, 1894

Type species
- Nautilus dekayi Morton 1834

Species
- See text

= Eutrephoceras =

Eutrephoceras Temporal range: Late Jurassic–Miocene

Extinct genus of molluscs

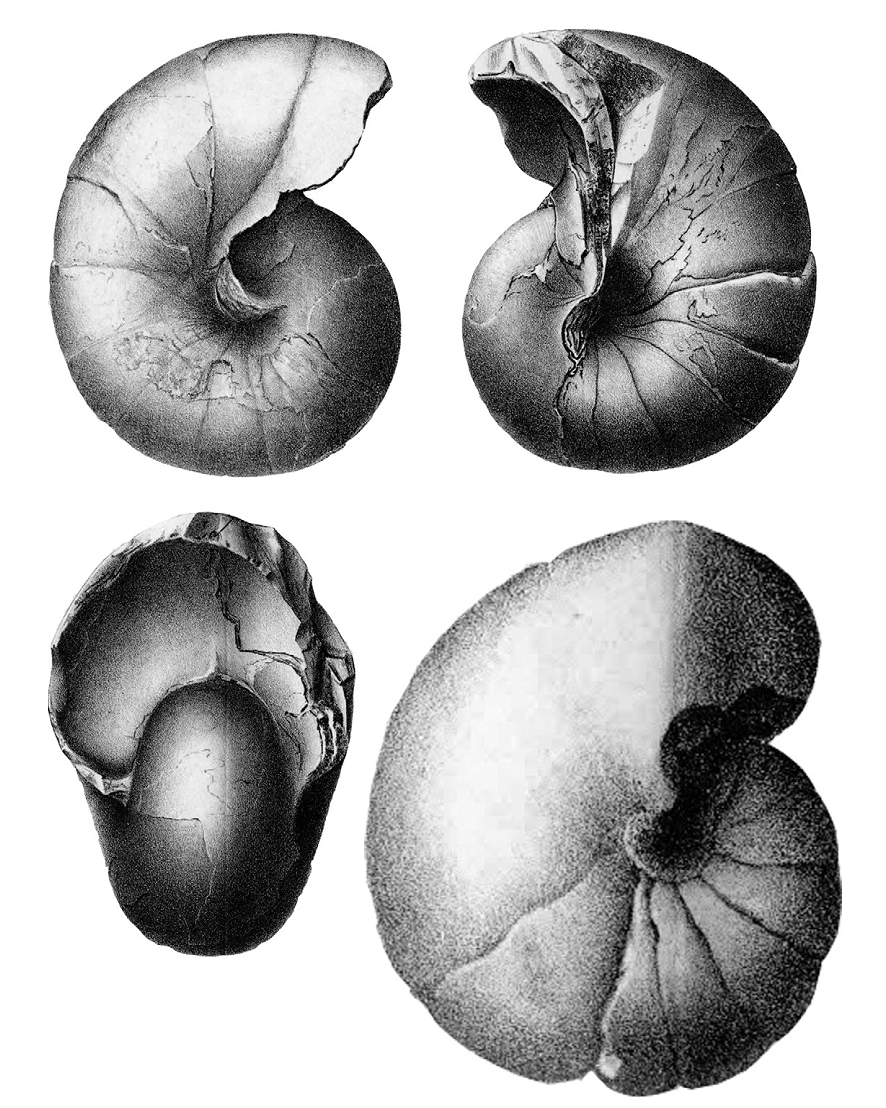
Eutrephoceras dorbignyanum

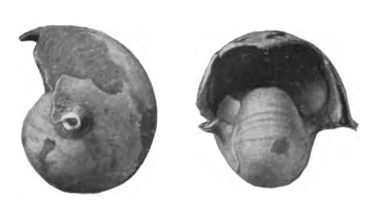
Eutrephoceras dekayi from the Coon Creek Formation

Eutrephoceras is an extinct genus of nautilus from the Late Jurassic to the Miocene (around 161 to 5 million years ago). They are characterized by a highly rounded involute shell with slightly sinuous suture patterns.

== Description ==
Eutrephoceras typically possess nearly globular conchs (shells). The whorls are reniform (kidney-shaped) in cross section and broadly rounded on the sides and lower edge. On the upper edge it is only slightly curved. The surface of the shell is usually smooth, but can sometimes be sculptured. The suture patterns are slightly sinuous, though it can be more or less straight in some species. The umbilicus is small and barely noticeable, sometimes hidden altogether. The septa are averagely convex towards the tip. The siphuncle is small and circular in cross section. It can vary in position considerably and its placement is important in identifying different species under the genus, but it is never marginal.

Puncture marks made by teeth on several Late Cretaceous-aged Eutrephoceras fossils (such as E. campbelli, of the Trent River Formation in Vancouver) are cited as evidence of mosasaur predation on this genus.

== Distribution ==
Eutrephoceras can be found in Late Jurassic to Miocene formations confirmed in many places in the earth, and many species are valid.

== Taxonomy ==
Eutrephoceras is classified under the family Nautilidae, which includes the only extant nautiloids of the genera Allonautilus and Nautilus. They are part of the superfamily Nautilaceae, the only superfamily of nautiloids to survive past the Triassic. Eutrephoceras are sometimes separated into the monogeneric family Eutrephoceratidae as first proposed by A.K. Miller in 1951, but most authors include it under Nautilidae.

Listed below is the approximately 82 species belonging to Eutrephoceras as of October 2026.

- Eutrephoceras ahltenense Schulter, 1876
- Eutrephoceras alcesense Reeside, 1927
- Eutrephoceras allani Fleming, 1945
- Eutrephoceras allionii Michelotti, 1840
- Eutrephoceras angolaense Wiedmann, 1960
- Eutrephoceras antarcticum Landman et al., 2004
- Eutrephoceras astierianum d'Orbigny, 1850
- Eutrephoceras azraqensis Al-Harithi and Ibrahim, 1992
- Eutrephoceras bellerophon Lundgren, 1867
- Eutrephoceras berryi Miller, 1947
- Eutrephoceras blanki Shimansky, 1975
- Eutrephoceras boissieri Pictet, 1866
- Eutrephoceras bouchardianum d'Orbigny, 1840
- Eutrephoceras burundukhajense Shimansky, 1975
- Eutrephoceras carolinense Kellum, 1926
- Eutrephoceras carolinensis Kellum, 1926
- Eutrephoceras charpentieri Leymerie, 1851
- Eutrephoceras claramontanum Kuhn, 1939
- Eutrephoceras clementinum d'Orbigny, 1840
- Eutrephoceras dartevellei Miller, 1951
- Eutrephoceras darupense Schluter, 1876
- Eutrephoceras decorum Shimansky, 1975
- Eutrephoceras dekayi (Morton, 1834) (type)
- Eutrephoceras depressum van Binckhorst, 1861
- Eutrephoceras donbassicum Shimansky, 1975
- Eutrephoceras dorbignyanum (Forbes in Darwin, 1846)
- Eutrephoceras douvillei Spath, 1927
- Eutrephoceras dubaleni Peyrot, 1932
- Eutrephoceras expansum Sowerby, 1824
- Eutrephoceras eyerdami Palmer, 1961
- Eutrephoceras faxoense Hyatt, 1894
- Eutrephoceras flammeum Ronchetti, 1947
- Eutrephoceras globosum Tinant, 1987
- Eutrephoceras hacobjani Shimansky, 1974
- Eutrephoceras hallidayi (Waring, 1914)
- Eutrephoceras hannai Vokes, 1937
- Eutrephoceras indicum d'Orbigny, 1850
- Eutrephoceras insigne Shimansky, 1975
- Eutrephoceras irritilasi Ifrim et al., 2013
- Eutrephoceras izumoensis Yokoyama, 1913
- Eutrephoceras japonicus (Shimizu, 1926)
- Eutrephoceras johnsoni Miller, 1947
- Eutrephoceras jonesi Miller and Thompson, 1933
- Eutrephoceras justum Blanford, 1861
- Eutrephoceras kummeli Wiedmann, 1960
- Eutrephoceras laverdei Durham, 1946
- Eutrephoceras lentiforme Stoliczka, 1866
- Eutrephoceras leonei Negri, 1934
- Eutrephoceras marksi Miller, 1947
- Eutrephoceras merteni Wiedmann, 1960
- Eutrephoceras montanaense Meek, 1876
- Eutrephoceras montanensis Kummel, 1954
- Eutrephoceras montmollini Pictet and Campiche, 1859
- Eutrephoceras moskvini Shimansky, 1975
- Eutrephoceras municeps Shimansky, 1975
- Eutrephoceras neubergicus Redtenbacher, 1873
- Eutrephoceras nodai Matsumoto, 1983
- Eutrephoceras oregonense Miller, 1947
- Eutrephoceras parisiense Deshayes, 1865
- Eutrephoceras perlatus Morton, 1834
- Eutrephoceras planoventer Stephenson, 1941
- Eutrephoceras quadrilineatum Favre, 1869
- Eutrephoceras reesidei Stenzel, 1940
- Eutrephoceras rotundum Crick, 1898
- Eutrephoceras sloani Reeside, 1924
- Eutrephoceras soyaense Matsumoto and Miyauchi, 1983
- Eutrephoceras spengleri Wiedmann, 1960
- Eutrephoceras sphaericum (Forbes, 1846)
- Eutrephoceras stephensoni (Dickerson, 1914)
- Eutrephoceras subfleuriausianum d'Archiac, 1850
- Eutrephoceras subinflatum d'Orbigny, 1850
- Eutrephoceras sublaevigatum d'Orbigny, 1850
- Eutrephoceras subrotundum Crick, 1898
- Eutrephoceras tawaense Furuichi, 1982
- Eutrephoceras traubi Schultz, 1976
- Eutrephoceras tumescens Frauscher, 1895
- Eutrephoceras umbilicare Deshayes, 1835
- Eutrephoceras urbanum Sowerby, 1843
- Eutrephoceras uzense Shimansky, 1975
- Eutrephoceras vastum Kner, 1850
- Eutrephoceras victorianum Teichert, 1943
- Eutrephoceras waageni Gemmellaro, 1886
