= Foveroceras =

Foveroceras Temporal range: Asselian–Sakmarian

Scientific classification
- Kingdom: Animalia
- Phylum: Mollusca
- Class: Cephalopoda
- Subclass: Nautiloidea
- Order: Nautilida
- Family: †Permoceratidae
- Genus: †Foveroceras; Leonova and Shchedukhin, 2023
- Species: †F. magnum

Binomial name
- †Foveroceras magnum Leonova and Shchedukhin, 2023

Extinct genus of cephalopods

Foveroceras is a monospecific fossil genus of cephalopods in the family Permoceratidae, alongside its only other member, Permoceras, which is also the family's type genus.

The type and only species is Foveroceras magnum.
