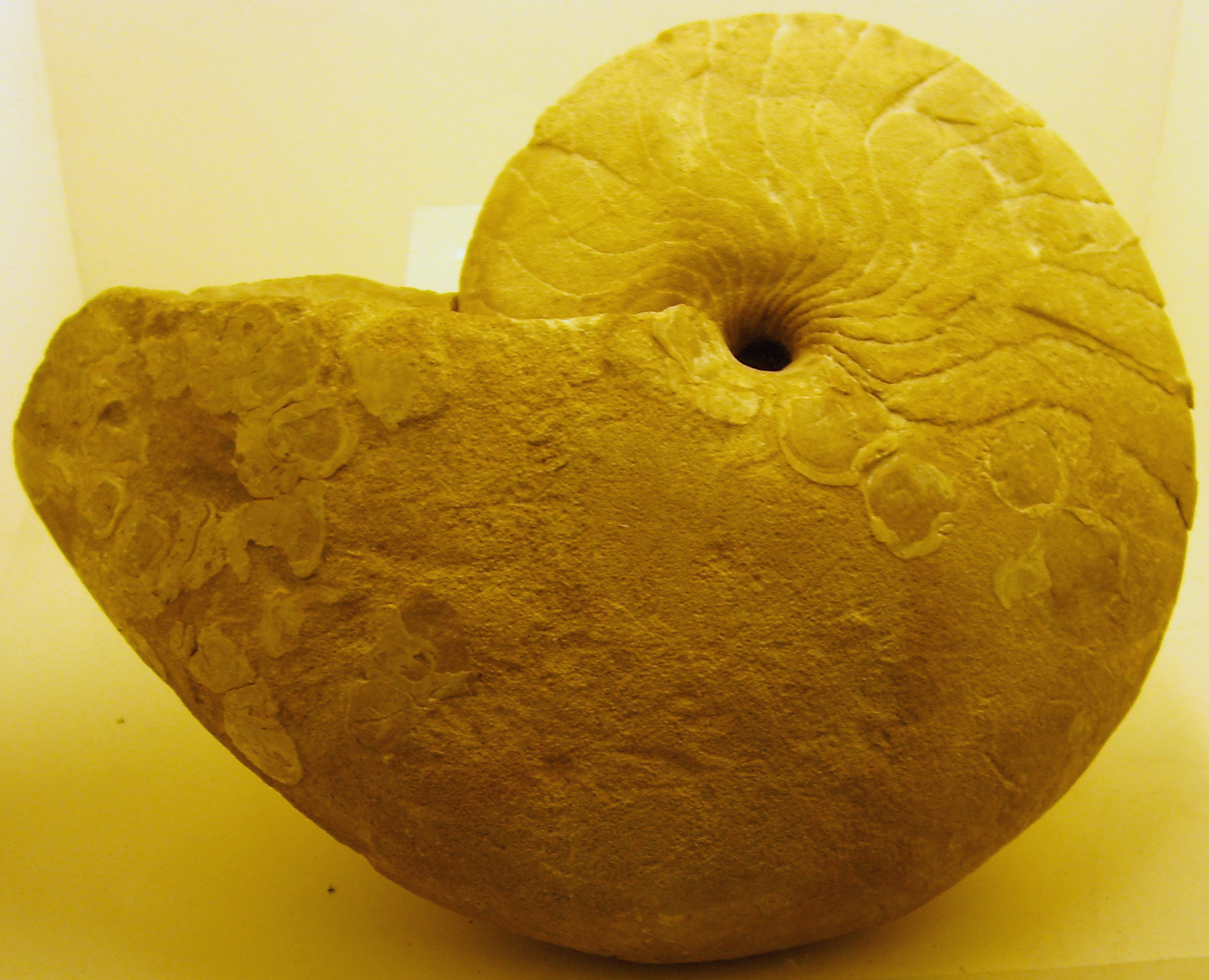
- Shell of Cimomia sp.

Scientific classification
- Domain: Eukaryota
- Kingdom: Animalia
- Phylum: Mollusca
- Class: Cephalopoda
- Subclass: Nautiloidea
- Order: Nautilida
- Family: †Hercoglossidae
- Genus: †Cimomia; Conrad, 1866

species
- C. desertora; C. camachoi; C. burtini; C. buccinaeformis; C. blakei; C. (Afrocimomia); C. marylandensis; C. dessauvagiei; C. heberti; C. haltomi; C. gosavicus; C. hunti; C. hilarionis; C. hesperia; C. elliptica; C. forbesi; C. felix; C. galicianus; C. imperialis; C. intuscatenatus; C. karkarensis; C. kugleri; C. kurkurensis; C. landanensis; C. leonicensis; C. macfadyeni; C. marylandensis; C. wylliei; C. vestali; C. vaughani; C. tessieri; C. tenuicosta; C. sudanensis; C. subrecta; C. stoliczkai; C. sowerbyana; C. septemcastrensis; C. seelandi; C. schroederi; C. sahariensis; C. reymenti; C. pusilla; C. pernambucensis; C. ogbei; C. negritensis; C. mokattamensis; C. milleri

= Cimomia =

Cimomia Temporal range: Late Cretaceous – Chattian, 103–23 Ma

Extinct genus of molluscs

Cimomia is an extinct genus of nautilid cephalopods ranging from the Early Cretaceous to Late Oligocene of North America, Asia, Australia, South America, Europe and New Zealand.
