= Permoceras =

Permoceras Temporal range: Kungurian

Scientific classification
- Kingdom: Animalia
- Phylum: Mollusca
- Class: Cephalopoda
- Subclass: Nautiloidea
- Order: Nautilida
- Family: †Permoceratidae
- Genus: †Permoceras; Miller and Collinson, 1953
- Species: †P. bitauniensis

Binomial name
- †Permoceras bitauniensis (Haniel, 1915)

Genus of coiled nautiloids

Permoceras is a fossil genus of coiled nautiloids that lived during the Kungurian.

== Discovery ==
Permoceras was first identified in the Lower Permian of Timor in the East Indies and named by Miller and Collinson in 1953.

== Description ==
Permoceras has a smooth, compressed, involute shell; whorls higher than wide; earlier whorls hidden from view. The venter is rounded as are the ventral and umbilical shoulders; the flanks flattened. The siphuncle is ventrally subcentral. The suture, which is most characteristic, has a deep, narrow pointed ventral lobe and large, asymmetrical pointed lobes on either side.

The coiling and whorl structure of Permoceras almost precisely resembles those of Pseudonautilus from the Upper Jurassic.

== Taxonomy ==
Permoceras is the sister genus of Foveroceras, and the two are included in the family Permoceratidae, which is a member of the monotypic superfamily Permoceratoidea.

== See also ==
- Nautiloid
  - List of nautiloids
