= Cymatonautilus =

Cymatonautilus Temporal range: M-U Jurassic

Scientific classification
- Domain: Eukaryota
- Kingdom: Animalia
- Phylum: Mollusca
- Class: Cephalopoda
- Subclass: Nautiloidea
- Order: Nautilida
- Family: †Cymatoceratidae
- Genus: †Cymatonautilus; Spath, 1927

Extinct genus of molluscs

Cymatonautilus is a genus of cymatoceratids from the middle and upper Jurassic of Europe, the Middle East and Asia characterized by a robust shell with a wide umbilicus and subquadrate whorl section, slightly wider than high. The flanks and venter are flattened. The flanks have a wide lateral groove; the venter a more narrow median groove. The suture has a shallow ventral lobe and broad concave lateral lobes, crossed obliquely by sinuous ribs that produce a deep ventral sinus. The siphuncle is subcentral.
