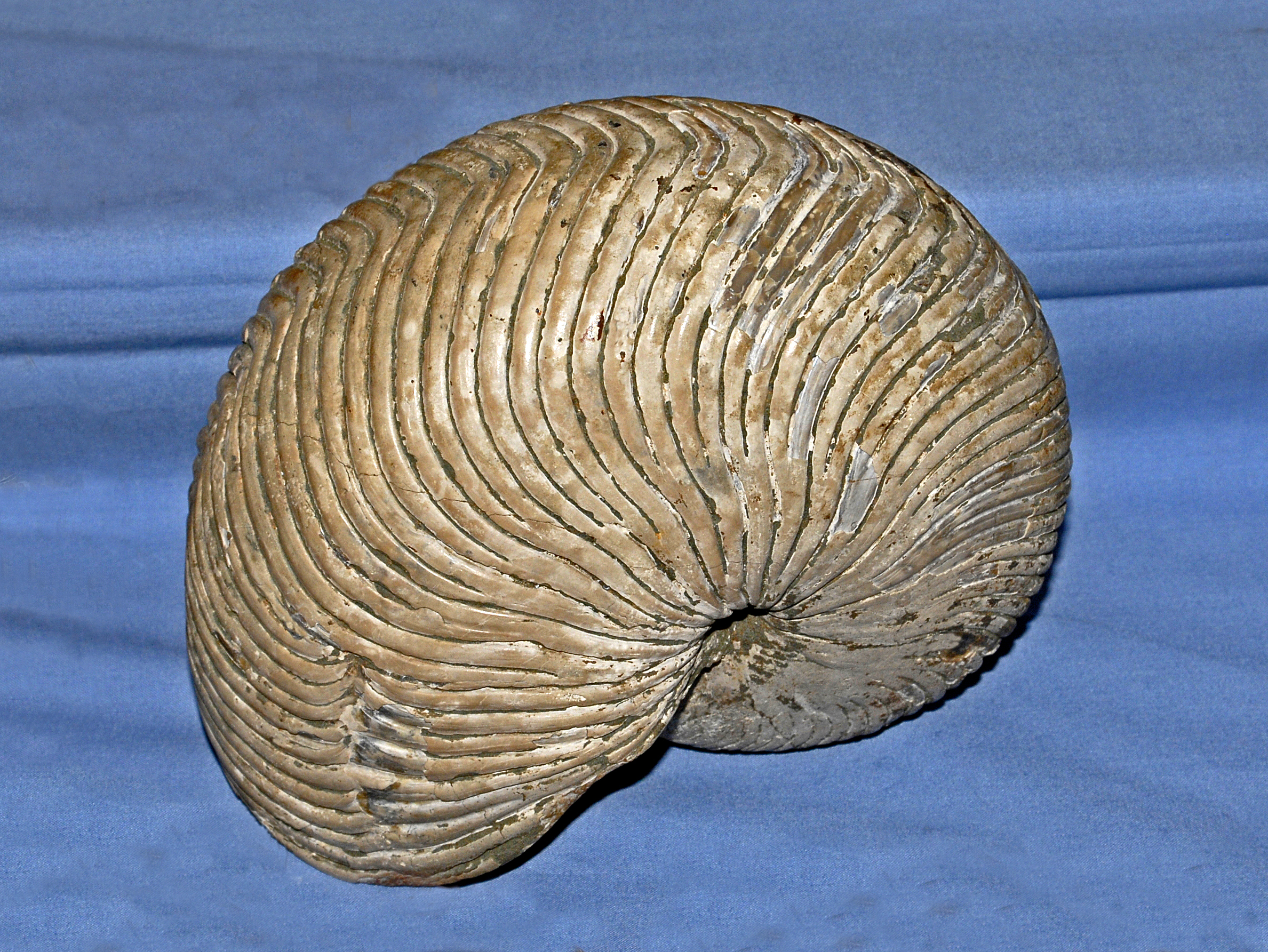
- Cymatoceras species from Albian of Madagascar

Scientific classification
- Domain: Eukaryota
- Kingdom: Animalia
- Phylum: Mollusca
- Class: Cephalopoda
- Subclass: Nautiloidea
- Order: Nautilida
- Family: †Cymatoceratidae
- Genus: †Cymatoceras; Hyatt, 1884

Species
- See text

= Cymatoceras =

Cymatoceras Temporal range: Late Jurassic - Late Oligocene ~155–23 Ma

Extinct genus of molluscs

Cymatoceras is a wide-ranging extinct genus from the nautilitacean cephalopod family, Cymatoceratidae. They lived from the Late Jurassic to Late Oligocene, roughly from 155 to 23 Ma.

== Species ==
The following species of Cymatoceras have been described:

- C. albense
- C. atlas
- C. bayfieldi
- C. bifidum
- C. bifurcatum
- C. carlottense
- C. cenomanense
- C. colombiana
- C. crebricostatum
- C. deslongchampsianum
- C. eichwaldi
- C. elegans
- C. hendersoni
- C. hilli
- C. honmai
- C. hunstantonensis
- C. huxleyanum
- C. karakaschi
- C. kayeanum
- C. kossmati
- C. loricatum
- C. ludevigi
- C. manuanensis
- C. mikado
- C. neckerianum
- C. negama
- C. neocomiense
- C. pacificum
- C. paralibanoticum
- C. patagonicum
- C. patens
- C. perstriatum
- C. picteti
- C. pseudoatlas
- C. pseudoelegans
- C. pseudoneokomiense
- C. pseudonegama
- C. pulchrum
- C. radiatum
- C. renngarteni
- C. sakalavum
- C. sarysuense
- C. savelievi
- C. semilobatum
- C. sharpei
- C. tenuicostatum
- C. tourtiae
- C. tskaltsithelense
- C. tsukushiense
- C. virgatum
- C. yabei

== Description ==
Its shell is generally subglobular, variably involute with a rounded whorl section. Sides and venter bear conspicuous ribs. The suture is only slightly sinuous and the siphuncle position is variable.

Paracymatoceras, coeval during the Late Jurassic and Early Cretaceous differs primarily in having a more sinuous suture. Neocymatoceras tsukushiense from the Oligocene Ashiya Group of Japan, described by Kobayashi, 1954, has been reassigned to Cymatoceras.

== Fossil record ==
Fossils of Cymatoceras are found in marine strata from the Jurassic until the Oligocene (age range: from 155.7 to 23 million years ago.). Fossils are known from several localities:

Jurassic

Mexico

Cretaceous

Antarctica, Argentina, Armenia, Azerbaijan, Chile, Colombia (Payandé, Tolima and La Guajira), France, Georgia, Germany, Greenland, India, Italy, Japan, Kazakhstan, Madagascar, Mexico, Morocco, Mozambique, Papua New Guinea, Poland, the Russian Federation, Switzerland, Tanzania, Turkmenistan, Ukraine, the United Kingdom, United States (California, New Mexico, Texas).

Oligocene

Japan
