= Paracenoceratidae =

Paracenoceratidae Temporal range: Mid Jurassic – Albian

Scientific classification
- Kingdom: Animalia
- Phylum: Mollusca
- Class: Cephalopoda
- Subclass: Nautiloidea
- Order: Nautilida
- Infraorder: Nautilaceae
- Family: †Paracenoceratidae; Spath, 1927

Extinct family of molluscs

The Paracenoceratidae are an extinct family of prehistoric nautiloids. The cephalopods lived during the Jurassic and Cretaceous periods.

== Genera ==
- Aulacenoceras
- Paracenoceras
- Somalinautilus
- Tithonoceras
