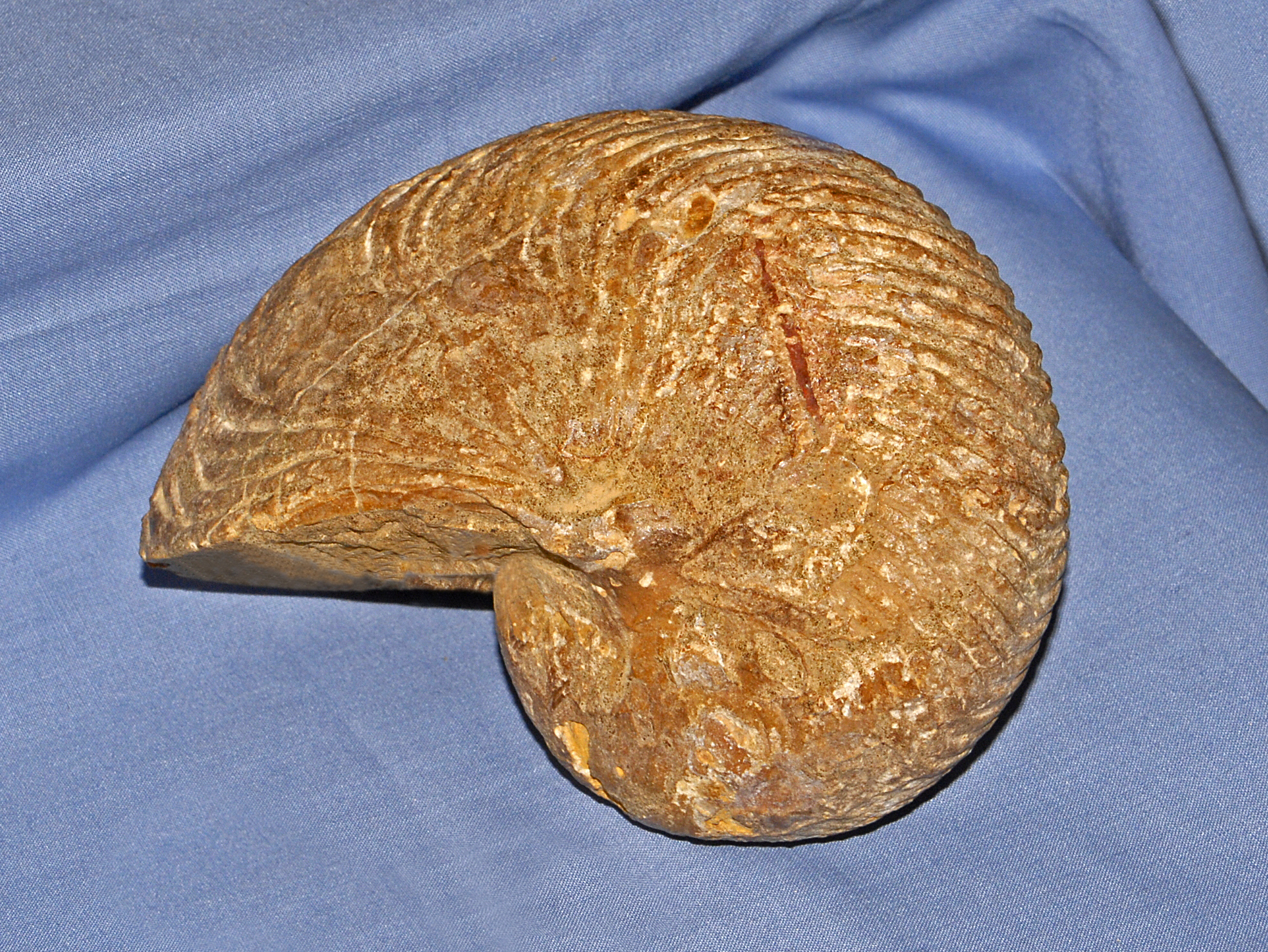
- Cymatoceras species

Scientific classification
- Domain: Eukaryota
- Kingdom: Animalia
- Phylum: Mollusca
- Class: Cephalopoda
- Subclass: Nautiloidea
- Order: Nautilida
- Infraorder: Nautilaceae
- Family: †Cymatoceratidae; Spath, 1927

Genera
- See text

= Cymatoceratidae =

Cymatoceratidae Temporal range: Middle Jurassic–Oligocene

Extinct family of molluscs

The Cymatoceratidae is a family of Mesozoic and early Cenozoic nautiloid cephalopods and the most abundant of their kind in the Cretaceous. They are characterized by ribbed, generally involute shells of varied forms - coiled such that the outer whorl envelops the previous one, as with Nautilus, and sutures that are variably sinuous.

Cymatoceratids first appear in the Middle Jurassic, derived from the Lower Jurassic Cenoceras (Nautilidae) and extend as far as the Oligocene.

== Taxonomy ==
Ten cymatoceratid genera are described in the Treatise Part K, 1964. First to appear was the large, tightly involute, rapidly expanding Procymatoceras from the Middle Jurassic, followed by the Middle and Upper Jurassic Cymatonautilus which has a wide umbilicus and subquadrate whorl section. Procymatoceras and Cymatonautilus are followed by Cymatoceras and the similar Paracymatoceras.

Six genera are restricted to the Cretaceous; Eucymatoceras and Heminautilus from the Lower Cretaceous; Anglonautilus from both the Lower and Upper Cretaceous; Deltocymatoceras, Epicymatoceras, and Syrionautilus. Neocymatoceras from the Oligocene is synonymous with Cymatoceras.

Of the Cymatoceratidae, Cymatoceras has the longest temporal range, extending from the Late Jurassic to the Tertiary Oligocene. The only other to cross a period boundary is Paracymatoceras which lived during both the Late Jurassic and Early Cretaceous. The others are restricted to a simple period, sometimes to a single epoch.
