= Pseudonautilidae =

Pseudonautilidae Temporal range: Jurassic–Cretaceous

Scientific classification
- Domain: Eukaryota
- Kingdom: Animalia
- Phylum: Mollusca
- Class: Cephalopoda
- Subclass: Nautiloidea
- Order: Nautilida
- Infraorder: Nautilaceae
- Family: †Pseudonautilidae; Shimanskiy and Erlanger 1955

Genera
- See text

Extinct family of molluscs

Pseudonautilidae is a family of Jurassic and Lower Cretaceous nautilid cephalopods belonging to the same superfamily as modern Nautilus, Nautilaceae, but forming a different branch from the family Nautilidae. Pseudonautilids, together with other nautilids, were contemporary with the ammonoids, which comprise an entirely different set of shelled cephalopod stocks more closely related to octopus and squid.

Pseudonautilids are characterized by an involute, generally compressed, nautiliconic shell; highly sinuous "goniatitic" sutures; and siphuncle generally located between the center and venter. Three genera are included.

- Pseudonautilus: Shell involute, compressed; whorl section higher than wide, flanks flattened; venter broadly arched; umbilicus small and deep; suture with deep narrow ventral lobe, large V-shaped lateral lobes on either side followed by rounded saddles then smaller lobes just above the umbilical seam; siphuncle subventral. Found in Europe and North Africa. An almost perfect homeomorph of the Permian Permoceras. Range as for family.
- Pseudaganides Nautiliconic; whorl section subrectangular to compressed with flattened flanks converging toward a flattened to rounded venter; suture with ventral lobe and broad deep lateral lobes; siphuncle central to subcentral.. Found in the Jurassic of Europe and Pakistan.
- Xenocheilus Like Pseudonautilus but with subangular ventral shoulders and rounded, rather than pointed, lateral lobes. From the Upper Jurassic and Lower Cretaceous of Europe and north Aftrica.
