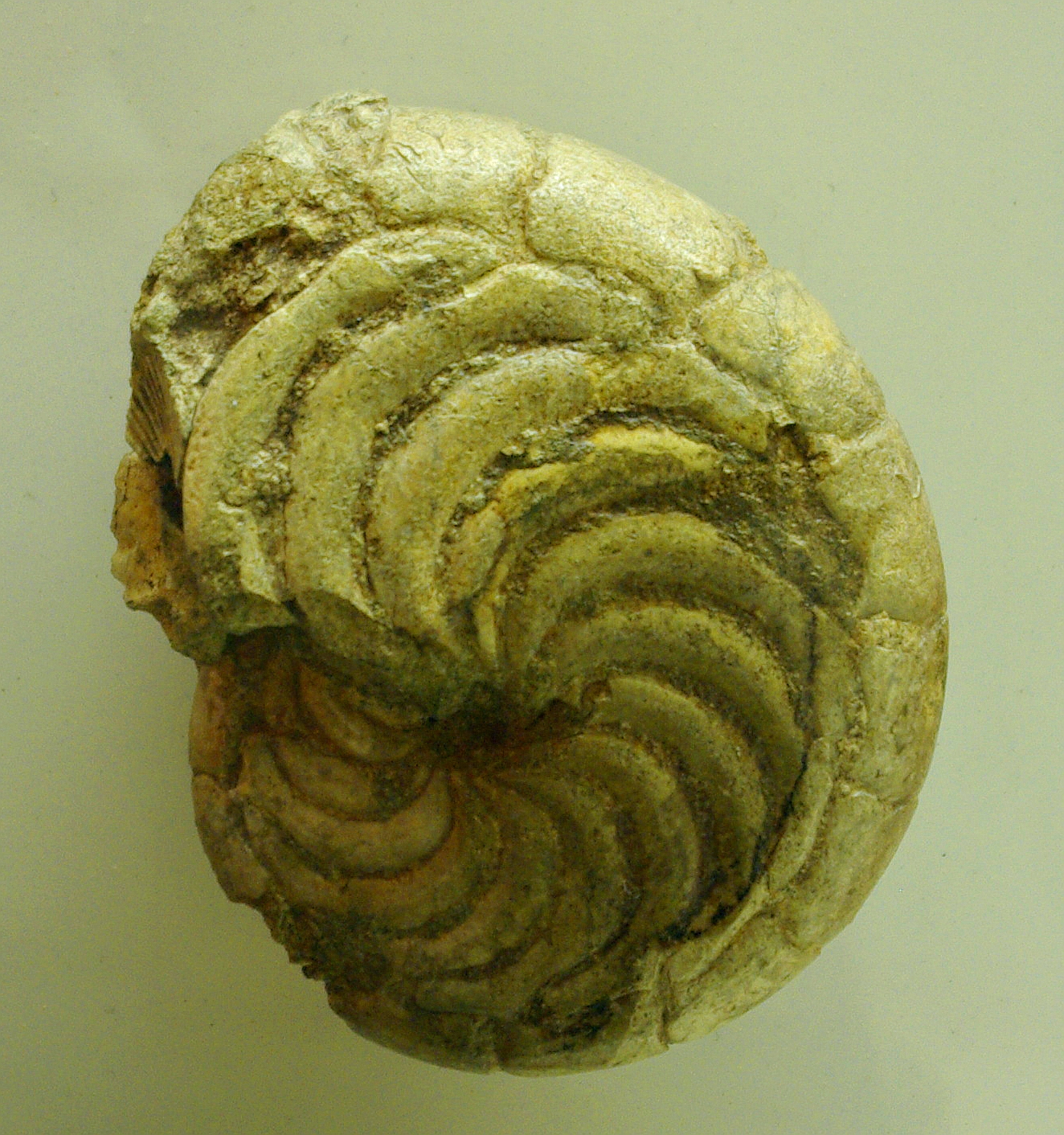
- Fossils of Aturia species

Scientific classification
- Kingdom: Animalia
- Phylum: Mollusca
- Class: Cephalopoda
- Subclass: Nautiloidea
- Order: Nautilida
- Family: †Aturiidae; Chapman, 1857
- Genus: †Aturia; Bronn, 1838

= Aturia =

Aturia Temporal range: Paleocene–Miocene

Extinct genus of molluscs

Aturia is an extinct genus of Paleocene to Miocene nautilids within Aturiidae, a monotypic family, established by Campman in 1857 for Aturia Bronn, 1838, and is included in the superfamily Nautilaceae in Kümmel 1964.

Aturia is characterized by a smooth, highly involute, discoidal shell with a complex suture and subdorsal siphuncle. The shell of Aturia is rounded ventrally and flattened laterally; the dorsum is deeply impressed. The suture, one of the most complex in the Nautiloidea, has a broad flattened ventral saddle, narrow pointed lateral lobes, broad rounded lateral saddles, broad lobes on the dorso-umbilical slopes, and a broad dorsal saddle divided by a deep, narrow median lobe. The siphuncle is moderate in size and located subdorsally in the adapical dorsal flexture of the septum. Based on the feeding and hunting behaviors of living nautiluses, Aturia most likely preyed upon small fish and crustaceans.

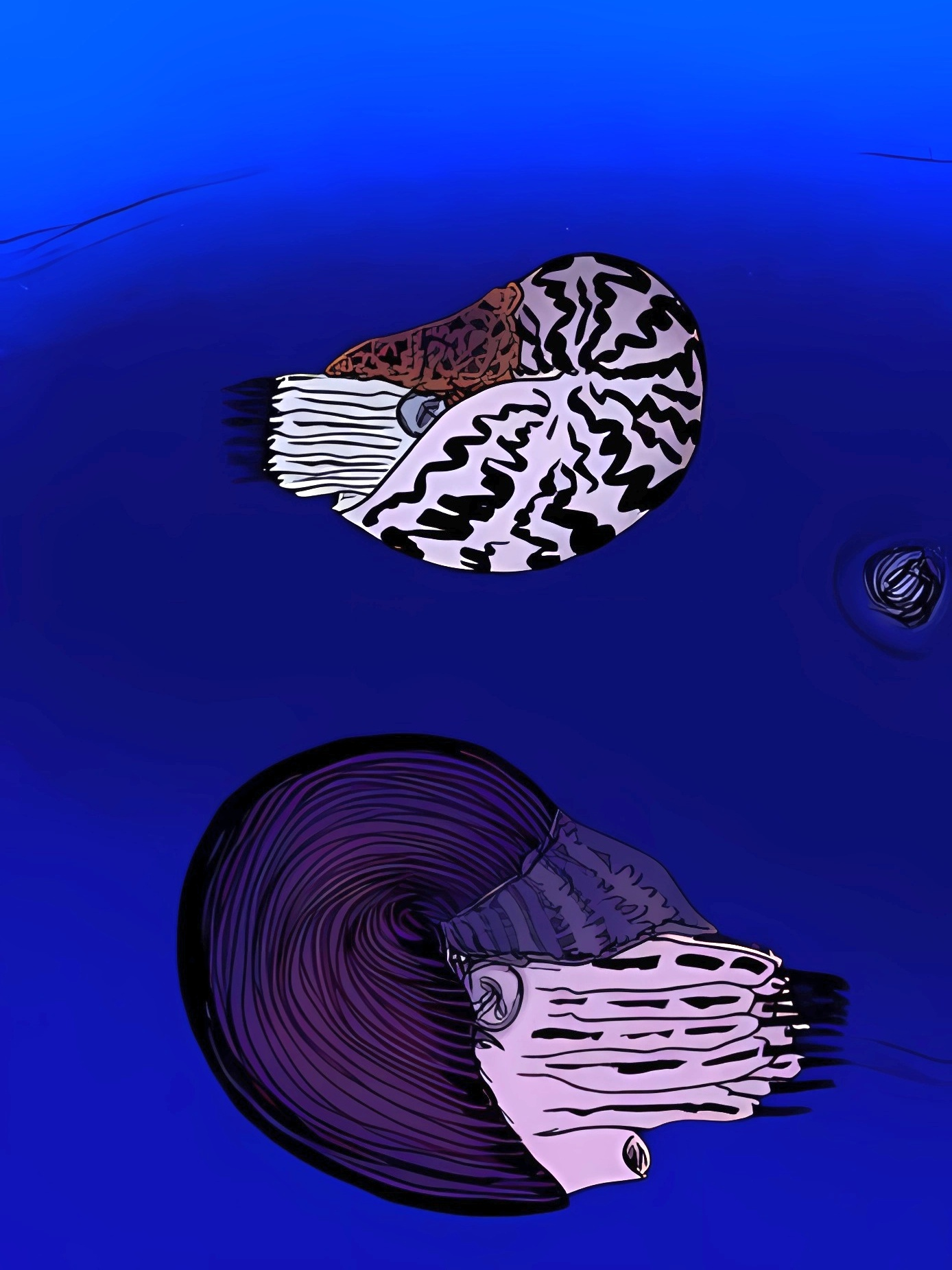
Comparisons of the nautilid cephalopods Nautilus cookanum (top) and A. alabamensis (bottom), from the Late Eocene Hoko River Formation, Oregon.

Aturia is likely derived from species of the genus Aturoidea of the family Hercoglossidae. Fossils of Aturia species are fairly cosmopolitan, being found from Paleogene-aged to Miocene-aged marine strata throughout the world: after the Miocene, the various species disappear from the fossil record. In contrast to Nautilidae, Aturia has no modern descendants.

== Extinction ==
Because of its slow reproductive rate, slow lateral migration, and limited escape response, Aturia was extremely vulnerable to predation by pinnipeds, and its extinction likely occurred as a result of the radiation of pinnipeds throughout the oceans that it lived in.

== See also ==
- List of nautiloids
