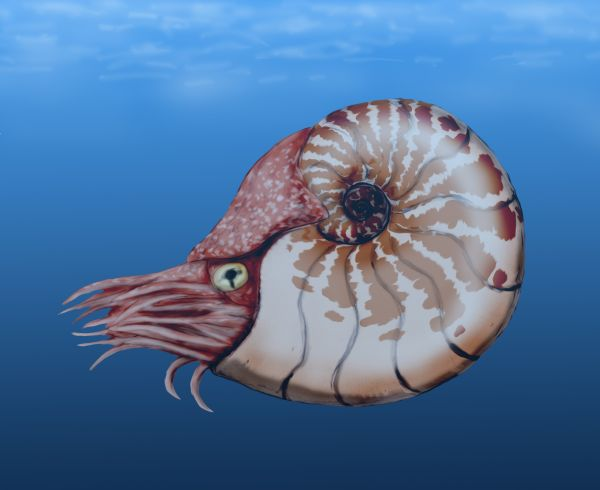
- Restoration
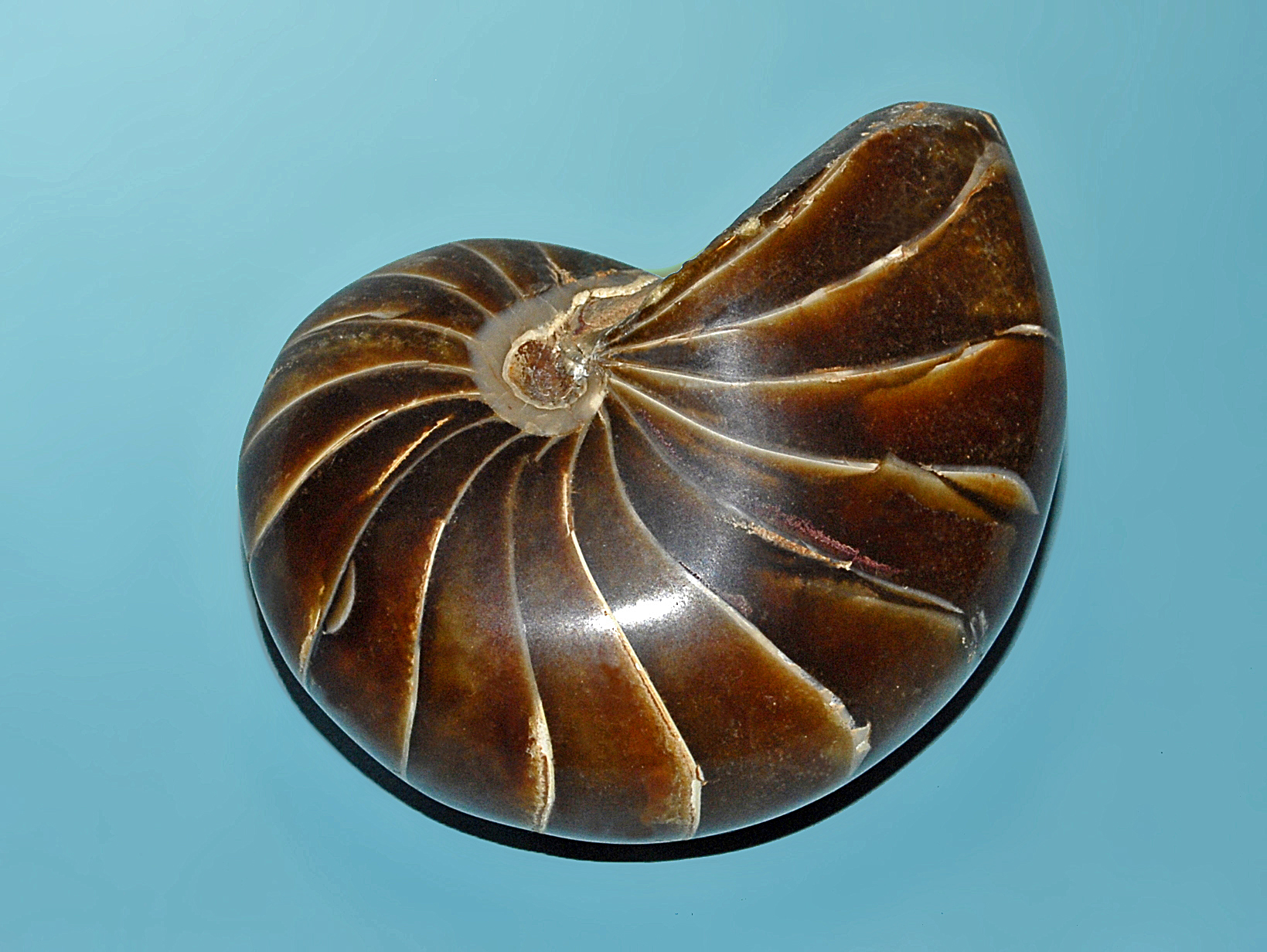
- Fossil of Cenoceras species from Mahajanga, Madagascar

Scientific classification
- Kingdom: Animalia
- Phylum: Mollusca
- Class: Cephalopoda
- Subclass: Nautiloidea
- Order: Nautilida
- Family: Nautilidae
- Genus: †Cenoceras; Hyatt, 1884

= Cenoceras =

Cenoceras Temporal range: Upper Triassic-Middle Jurassic

Extinct genus of molluscs

Cenoceras (meaning "recent horn") is an extinct genus within the cephalopod mollusc family Nautilidae, which in turn makes up part of the superfamily Nautilaceae. This genus has been described by Hyatt in 1884. The type species is Cenoceras intermedium, which was originally described by Sowerby 1816 as Nautilus intermedius.

== Species ==
- †Cenoceras boreale Dagys and Sobolev 1988
- †Cenoceras rumelangense Weis & Schweigert 2023
- †Cenoceras trechmanni Kummel 1953

== Description ==
Shells of these nektonic carnivores are variable in form, depending on species; ranges from evolute to involute, compressed lenticular to globose with rounded to flattened venter and flanks. The suture generally has shallow ventral and lateral lobes. The location of the siphuncle is variable, but never at an extreme ventral or dorsal position (Kümmel 1964, K449).

== Fossil range ==
Cenoceras has a fossil range from the Upper Triassic, Carnian age to the Middle Jurassic, Callovian age (from 235.0 to 163.5 Ma).
