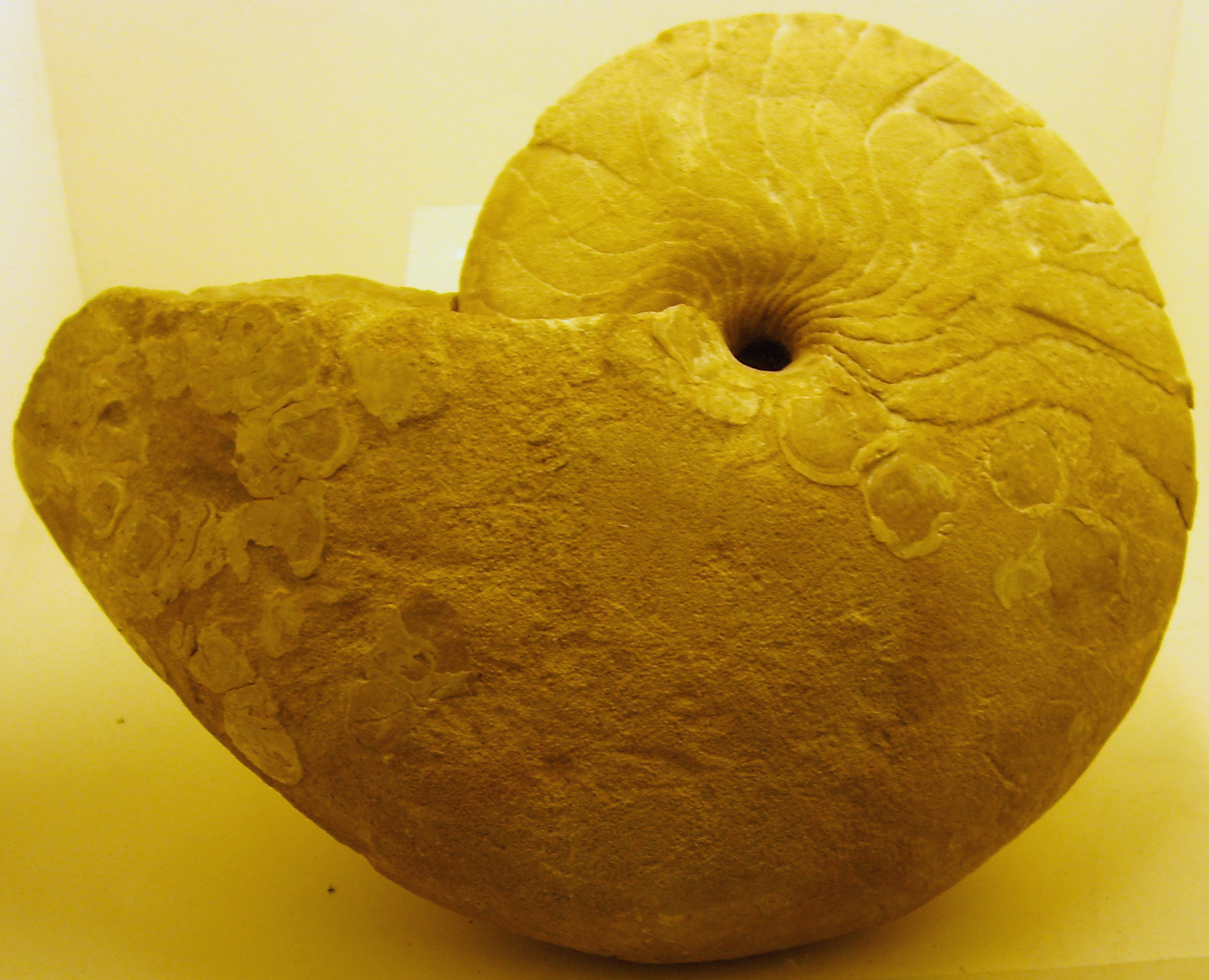
- Cimomia sp. fossil

Scientific classification
- Domain: Eukaryota
- Kingdom: Animalia
- Phylum: Mollusca
- Class: Cephalopoda
- Subclass: Nautiloidea
- Order: Nautilida
- Infraorder: Nautilaceae
- Family: †Hercoglossidae; Spath, 1927

Genera
- Aturoidea; Cimomia; Deltoidonatilus; Hercoglossa

= Hercoglossidae =

Hercoglossidae Temporal range: Upper Jurassic–Oligocene

Extinct family of molluscs

Hercoglossidae is a family of nautilid cephalopods in the superfamily Nautilaceae. It was established by Spath in 1927 for smooth, involute nautiloids characterized by a suture with differentiated elements, known from the Upper Jurassic to the Oligocene.

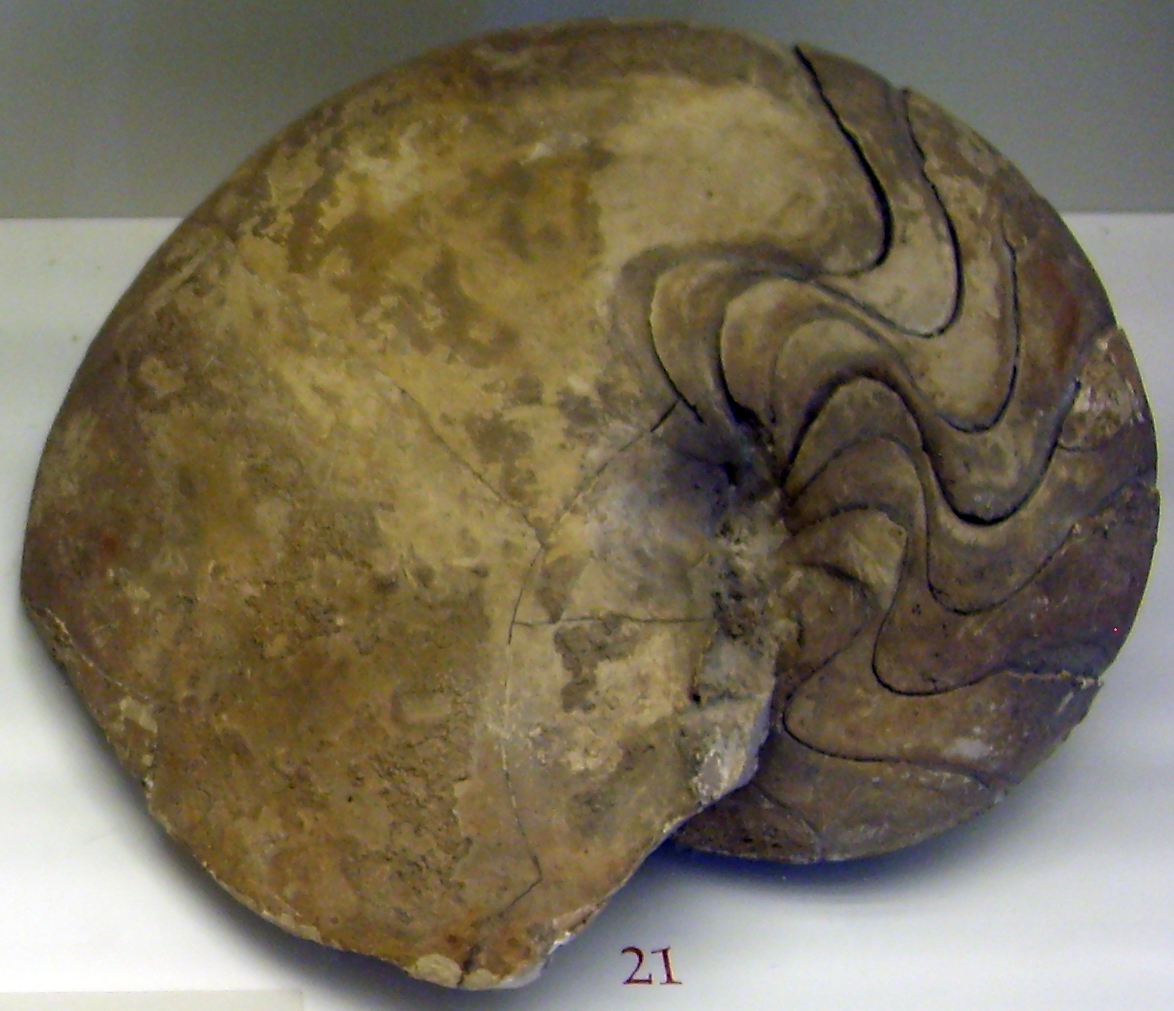
Hercoglossa danica fossil

Four genera are described in the Treatise. They are Hercoglossa, Aturoidea, Cimonia, and Deltoidonatilus. All have a whorl section that is generally rounded, except for Deltoidonatilus where in it is triangular in outline. Sutural complexity increases from Cimomia to Hercoglossa and to Aturoidea. The suture in Deltoidonautilus is like than in Hercoglossa.

Cimomia, which intergrades with Eutrephoceras, is the earliest and makes its first appearance in the Upper Jurassic. Eutrephoceras is assigned to the Nautilidae which includes Nautilus. Hercoglossa, which is derived from Cimomia, first appears in the Lower Cretaceous and is followed stratigraphically by Aturoidea and Deltoidonautilus which first appear in the Upper Cretaceous. Aturoidea is the progenitor of Aturia (of the monotypic Aturidae), to which it gave rise in the Paleocene.
