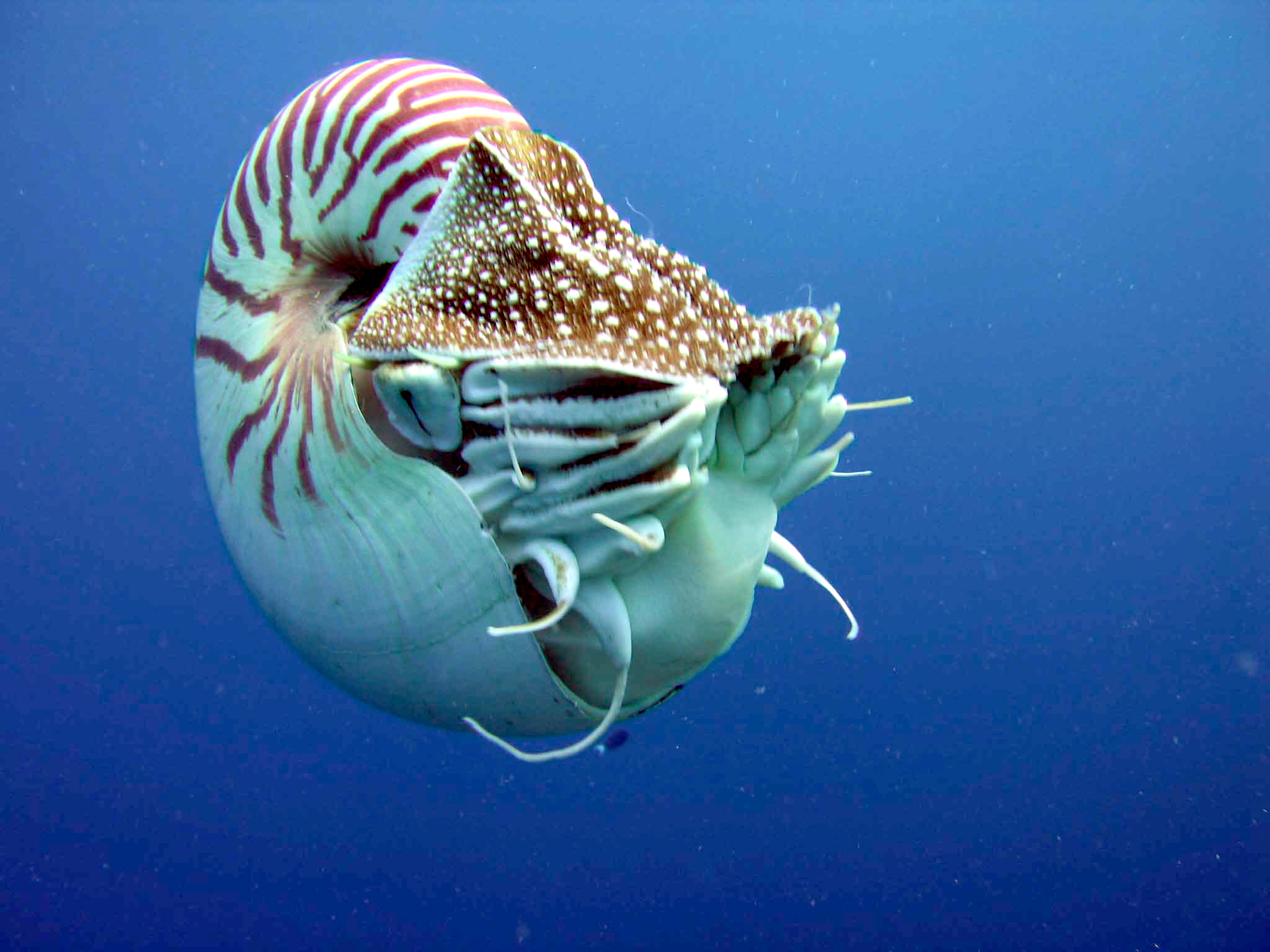
- Nautilus belauensis
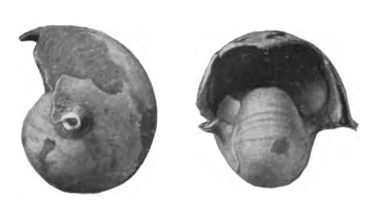
- Eutrephoceras dekayi

Scientific classification
- Kingdom: Animalia
- Phylum: Mollusca
- Class: Cephalopoda
- Subclass: Nautiloidea
- Order: Nautilida
- Suborder: Nautilina
- Superfamily: Nautilaceae; Blainville, 1825

Families
- †Aturiidae †Cenoceratidae †Cymatoceratidae †Hercoglossidae †Paracenoceratidae †Pseudonautilidae; Nautilidae

= Nautilaceae =

Nautilaceae Temporal range: Upper Triassic–Present

Superfamily of nautiloids

The Nautilaceae form one of five superfamilies that make up the Nautilida according to Bernard Kummel (1964), and the only one that survived past the Triassic. The Nautilaceae comprise seven families: Nautilidae, Paracenoceratidae, Pseudonautilidae, Cymatoceratidae, Hercoglossidae and Aturiidae. Shimanskiy (1957) separated the Paracenoceratidae and Pseudonautilidae from his near equivalent Nautilina and added them to the Lyroceratina, expanding the equivalent Clydonautiloidea and bringing it into the Jurassic. The Nautilaceae are represented by Nautilus and Allonautilus genera of the Nautilidae, the only extant family in this group.

Species in the Nautilaceae are generally smooth and involute with straight to strongly sinuous sutures and a small siphuncle. Some groups have sinuous plications or ribs.

The Nautilaceae began in the Late Triassic with Cenoceras, a globular to discoidal genus derived from the Syringonautilidae and possibly from Syringonautilus. Cenoceras, the earliest member of the Nautilaceae and Nautilidae, is the only nautiloid known to have crossed the upper Triassic boundary and the only one known from the Lower Jurassic.

All six families of the Nautilaceae, except for the Aturiidae (Aturia), are derived from the Cenoceras complex in the Middle Jurassic or from Eutrephoceras which immediately followed. The Cenozoic Aturia seems sufficiently derived to warrant familial distinction from its source, the Hercoglossidae.
