= Haydenoceras =

Haydenoceras Temporal range: Middle Devonian

Scientific classification
- Kingdom: Animalia
- Phylum: Mollusca
- Class: Cephalopoda
- Subclass: Nautiloidea
- Order: †Tarphycerida
- Family: †Barrandeoceratidae
- Genus: †Haydenoceras; Flower, 1949

Extinct genus of molluscs

Haydenoceras is a genus of middle Devonian cephalopods originally placed in the Barrandeocerida. The genus can be recognized by its strongly compressed, gradually expanding exogastrically curved shell with a strongly rounded dorsum and acutely angled venter, calling attention to the general form of earlier Bassleroceras. The siphuncle is tubular, central.

Related genera include Avilionella, Barrandeoceras, Gasconsoceras, Laureloceras, and Savageoceras.
