= Thoracoceras =

Thoracoceras Temporal range: Carboniferous - L Permian

Scientific classification
- Kingdom: Animalia
- Phylum: Mollusca
- Class: Cephalopoda
- Order: †Orthocerida
- Family: †Kionoceratidae
- Genus: †Thoracoceras; Sweet, 1964

Extinct genus of molluscs

Thoracoceras is an extinct genus of orthocerids from the family Kionoceratidae characterized by orthoconic shells marked by prominent longitudinal rounded grooves separated by angular ridges, each which has a single row of blunt spines along its apex, and having a small submarginal siphuncle.

Thoracoceras, named by Fischer De Waldheim in 1844, is found in Carboniferous and Lower Permian sediments in the U.S., Europe, and Russia. It is closely related to Kionoceras, Ohioceras, and Polygrammoceras
