= Plectoceras =

Plectoceras Temporal range: Mid to Late Ordovician

Scientific classification
- Domain: Eukaryota
- Kingdom: Animalia
- Phylum: Mollusca
- Class: Cephalopoda
- Subclass: Nautiloidea
- Order: †Tarphycerida
- Family: †Plectoceratidae
- Genus: †Plectoceras; Hyatt,1884

Genus of molluscs

Plectoceras is a genus of nautiloids included in the tarphycerid suborder Barrandeocerina that lived during the Middle and Late Ordovician. It has been found widespread in the Middle and Upper Ordovician of North America.

Plectoceras has a coiled, costate shell with a perforate (see-through) umblilcus; whorls are dorsally impressed by end of first volution but loosen in the adult stage with the mature body chamber diverging from the adjacent whorl. Costae (ribs) slope dorso-ventrally toward the apex and sutures are straight or have lateral lobes. The siphuncle is subventral, orthochoanitic with short, straight necks and thin connecting rings.

Plectoceras and its contemporary Barrandeoceras are both likely derived from the Tarphyceratidae; Plectoceras with its subventral siphuncle possibly from Campbelloceras, Barrandeoceras with its subcentral siphuncle possibly from Centrotarphyceras.
