= Gaspocyrtoceras =

Gaspocyrtoceras Temporal range: Middle Silurian

Scientific classification
- Kingdom: Animalia
- Phylum: Mollusca
- Class: Cephalopoda
- Order: †Orthocerida
- Family: †Paraphragmitidae
- Genus: †Gaspocyrtoceras; Foerste, 1936

Extinct genus of molluscs

Gaspocyrtoceras is a genus of orthocerids included in the Paraphragmitidae. Its fossils are limited to North America and have been found in Wisconsin and Quebec.

The shell of Gaspocyrtoceras is a coarsely annularted exogastric cyrtocone. Curvature is upward, the ventral side convex in profile. Annulations slope dorso-ventally to the rear as they do in Calocyrtoceras. Striations on the surface, fine goove-like features, are longitudinal in contrast to the transverse striations of Cyrtocycloceras.
