= Jonesoceras =

Scientific classification
- Kingdom: Animalia
- Phylum: Mollusca
- Class: Cephalopoda
- Order: †Orthocerida
- Family: †Geisonoceratidae
- Genus: †Jonesoceras; Barscov, 1960

Extinct genus of molluscs

Jonesoceras is a genus of orthocerids from the Silurian of Bohemia named by Barscov, 1960, included in the Geisonoceratidae. Also named by him, from the same age and area, the related Joachimoceras and Temperoceras.
