= Charactoceras =

Charactoceras Temporal range:

Scientific classification
- Kingdom: Animalia
- Phylum: Mollusca
- Class: Cephalopoda
- Subclass: Nautiloidea
- Order: †Tarphycerida
- Family: †Apsidoceratidae
- Genus: †Charactoceras; Foerste, 1924

Genus of molluscs (fossil)

Charactoceras is a genus of tarphycerid cephalopods which lived during the Late Ordovician.

Charactoceras has a closely coiled, rapidly expanding evolute shell, dorsally impressed, with a flattened venter and rounded sides. Sutures are close spaced laterally, but with broad ventral and dorsal lobes. Hyponomic sinus is well developed. The siphuncle is cyrtochoanitic and empty, located between the center and venter; segments expanded slightly into the chambers.

The genus Charactocerina from the Late Orovician is similar but has costae on the dorsolateral region of the shell. Both are included in the family Apsidoceratidae. Also somewhat similar to Charactoceras in external form are Uranoceras and Cumingsoceras from the Middle Silurian, but both differ in detail.
