= Curtoceras =

Curtoceras Temporal range: Early Ordovician–Middle Ordovician

Scientific classification
- Domain: Eukaryota
- Kingdom: Animalia
- Phylum: Mollusca
- Class: Cephalopoda
- Subclass: Nautiloidea
- Order: †Tarphycerida
- Family: †Trocholitidae
- Genus: †Curtoceras; Ulrich, Foeste, Miller & Furnish, 1942

Genus of molluscs

Curtoceras is a genus in the tarphycerid family Trocholitidae of mollusks found widespread in the late Early and Middle Ordovician of North America and northern Europe (all species in the genus are fossils). Curtoceras has a shell that is gradually expanded, with half the fully mature body chamber divergent from the preceding volution. Whorl sections are near equidimensional with the inner margin (dorsum) moderately impressed. The surface may be smooth or weakly ribbed. The siphuncle is ventral in the initial chamber and becomes dorsal after one volution. With the exception of the dorsal siphuncle, Curtoceras is somewhat similar to the tarphyceratid Campbelloceras

== See also ==
- List of nautiloids
