= Bickmorites =

Bickmorites Temporal range: Late Ordovician -Mid Silurian

Scientific classification
- Domain: Eukaryota
- Kingdom: Animalia
- Phylum: Mollusca
- Class: Cephalopoda
- Subclass: Nautiloidea
- Order: †Tarphycerida
- Family: †Barrandeoceratidae
- Genus: †Bickmorites; Foerste 1925

Species
- see text

Extinct genus of molluscs

Bickmorites is an extinct nautiloid cephalopod genus known from the upper Ordovician to the middle Silurian of North America and northern Europe (Norway).

Bickmorites has a gyroconic shell, coiled such that whorls are not in contact, although close. The surface is strongly ribbed; ribs slant dorso-ventrally toward the apex. The siphuncle is narrow, located slightly ventral of the center. Septal necks are straight, making the siphuncle orthochoanitic.

Bickmorites seems to bridge the temporal gap between the Upper Ordovivian barrandeoceratid Antiplectoceras and the Middle Silurian barrandoeceratids Gasconsoceras, Laureloceras, and Savageoceras.

== See also ==
- List of nautiloids
