= Xainzanoceras =

Scientific classification
- Kingdom: Animalia
- Phylum: Mollusca
- Class: Cephalopoda
- Subclass: Nautiloidea
- Order: †Tarphycerida
- Family: †Lituitidae
- Genus: †Xainzanoceras; Chen, 1987

Genus of nautiloid cephalopods

Xainzanoceras is a genus of nautiloid cephalopods from the Upper Ordovician of China, assigned to the tarphyceratid family Lituitidae. The type, Xainzanoceras xaizangense resembles the ophidioceratid genus Ophioceras. The shell is evolute, discoidal, serpenticonic; whorl section rounded, covered with thick, straight, close spaced, radial ribs that curve slightly forward at the ventral margin where they become quickly reduced or lost.
