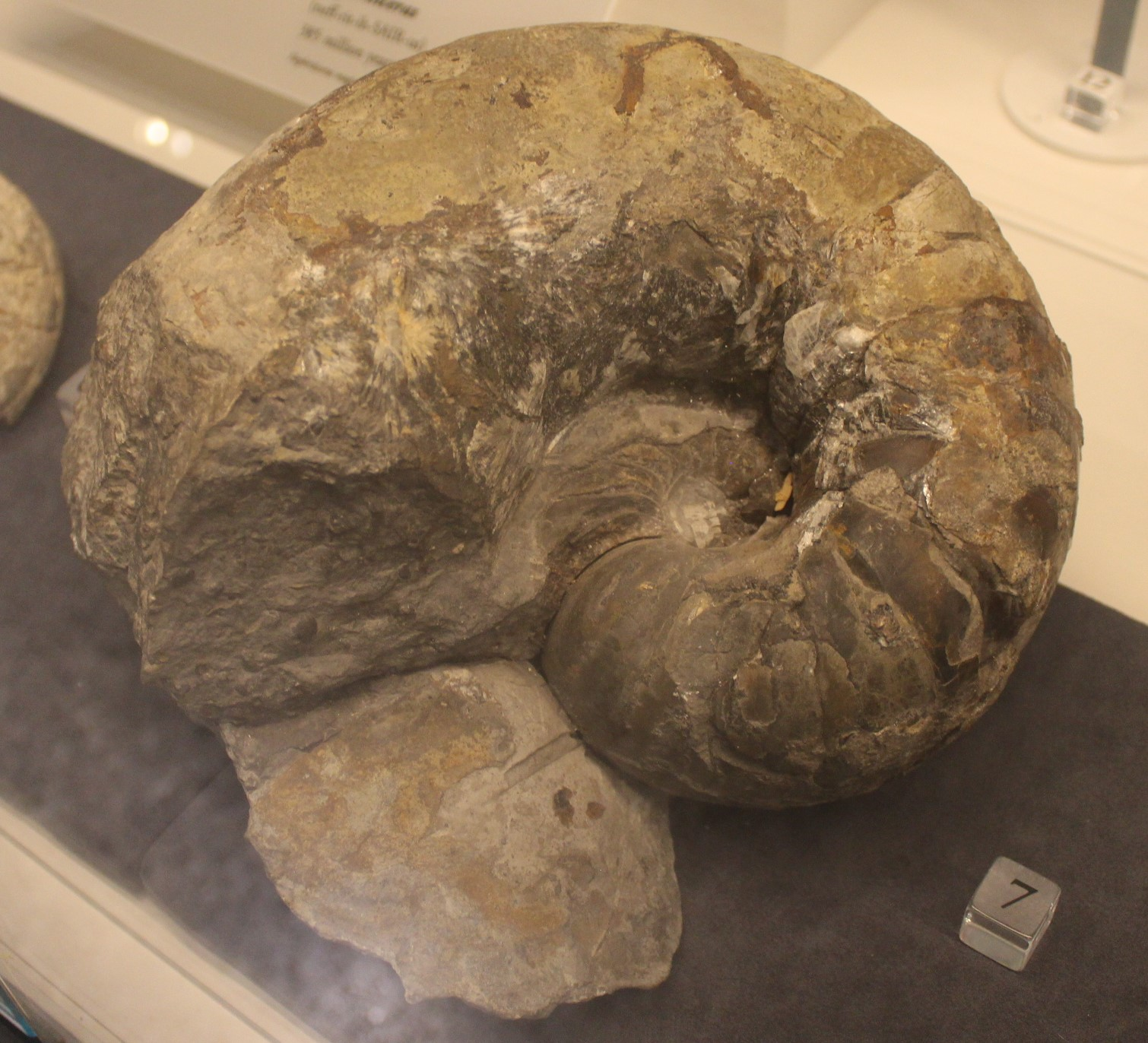
- Nephriticeras magister, University of Michigan Museum of Natural History

Scientific classification
- Domain: Eukaryota
- Kingdom: Animalia
- Phylum: Mollusca
- Class: Cephalopoda
- Subclass: Nautiloidea
- Order: †Tarphycerida
- Suborder: †Barrandeocerina
- Family: †Nephriticeratidae; Hyatt, 1894

Genera
- See text

= Nephriticeratidae =

Nephriticeratidae Temporal range: E-M Devonian

Extinct family of nautiloids

The Nephriticeratidae is a family of early Paleozoic (E-M Dev) nautilod cephalopods included in the Barrandeocerina (a suborder of tarphycerids sensu lato), distinguished by mostly cyrtoconic as well as gyroconic, sepenticontic, and sinstrally torticonic shells with large, typically straight necked (orthchoanitic) siphuncles. As for the suborder, connecting rings are thin.

== Derivation ==
The earliest genus included in the Nephriticeraatidae is the sinistrally torticconic Sphyradoceras, which comes from the Lower Devonian Schoharie Formation of New York. It is in fact the only torticonic genus in the family and the only genus known from the Barrandeocerina from the Lower Devonian. The early stage of Sphyradoceras is gyroconic, coiled in a plane but with whorls not touching, resembling the adult stage of the barrandeoceratid genus Bickmorites. This might suggest that the Nephriticeratidae has its origin in the Barrandeoceratidae, from Bickmorites, however the latest Bickmorites are from the Middle Silurian, leaving a gap in the Upper Silurian with no intermediary forms.

There is a genus form the Upper Silurian, Peismoceras which is included in the Lechritrochoceratidae, the only barradeocerin from that epoch, which could be ancestral, without having to account for any significant temporal gap. The problem is that Peismoceras is coiled dextrally, right handedly.

== Genera ==
With the exception of Sphyradoceras, from the Lower Devonian, all of the genera included in the Nephriticeratidae are restricted to the Middle Devonian. These are:

Nephriticeras
Baeopleuroceras
Endoplanoceras
Heracloceras
Lyrioceras
Nephriticerina
Rhadinoceras
Triplooceas
in Treatise K 1964 order (Sweet 1964).
