= Cyrtocycloceras =

Cyrtocycloceras Temporal range: Middle Silurian

Scientific classification
- Kingdom: Animalia
- Phylum: Mollusca
- Class: Cephalopoda
- Order: †Orthocerida
- Family: †Paraphragmitidae
- Genus: †Cyrtocycloceras; Foerste, 1936

Extinct genus of molluscs

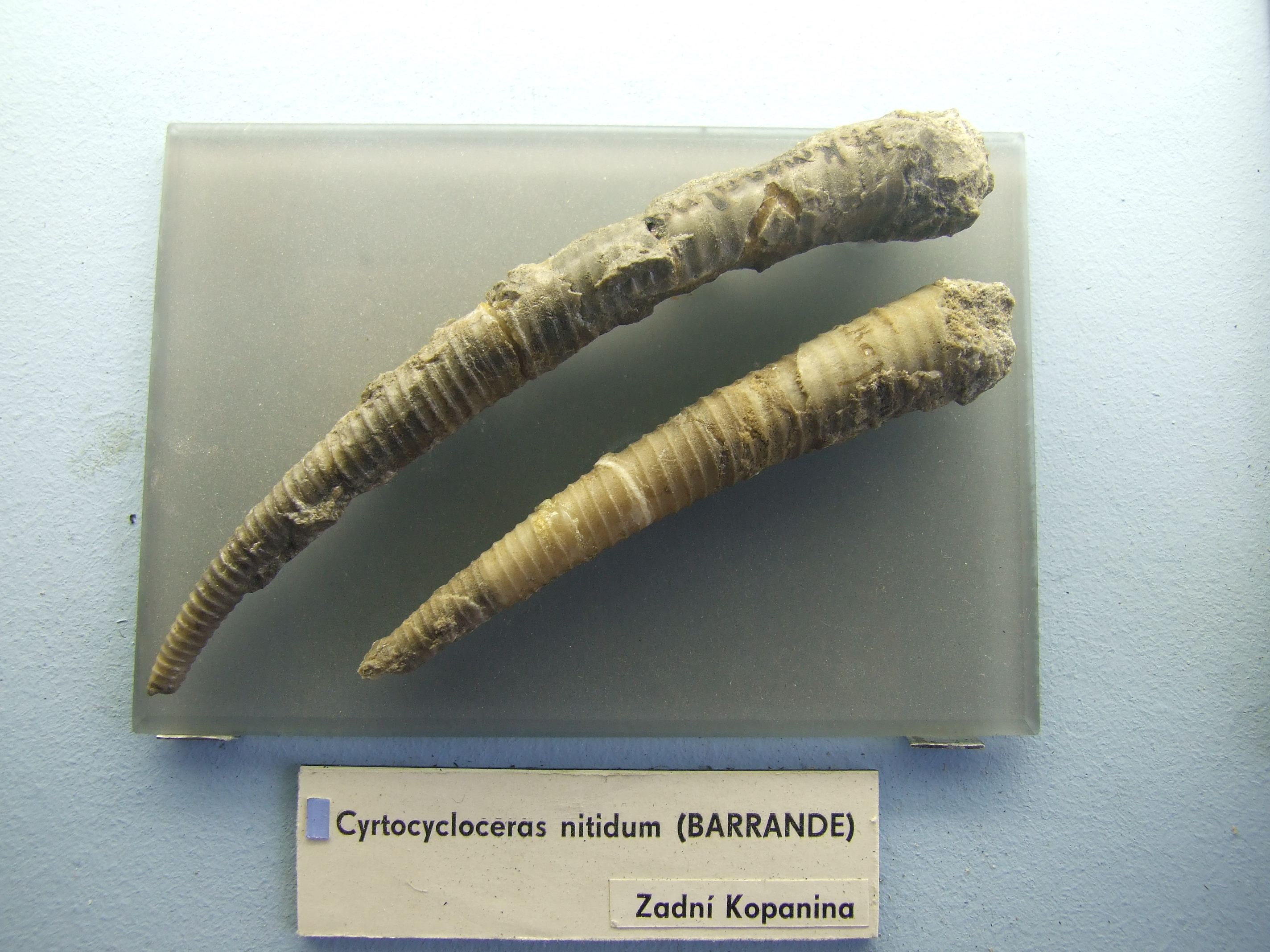
Fossilized Cyrtocycloceras nitidum specimens in the National Museum, Prague

Cyrtocycloceras is a genus of orthocerids from the Middle Silurian of Europe included in the Paraphragmitidae.

The shell, or conch, of Cyrtocycloceras is a moderately expanding annulated exogastric cyrtocone, with curvature like that of a rocking chair rocker. Annulations, encircling ribs, are close spaced and transverse and the surface is transversely striated.

Calocyrtoceras from the Middle Silurian of both Europe and North America is striated both transversely and longitudinally while Gaspocyrtoceras is striated only longitudinally. Moreover the annulations on Calocyrtoceras and Gaspocyrtoceras tend to be thicker and further apart than on Cyrtocycloceras.
