= Litoceras =

Litoceras Temporal range: Early Ordovician–Middle Ordovician

Scientific classification
- Domain: Eukaryota
- Kingdom: Animalia
- Phylum: Mollusca
- Class: Cephalopoda
- Subclass: Nautiloidea
- Order: †Tarphycerida
- Family: †Trocholitidae
- Genus: †Litoceras; Hyatt, 1884

Extinct genus of nautiloids

Litoceras is a trocholitid (Tarphycerida) genus that has been found in the Lower and Middle Ordovician of Newfoundland. Whorls in Litoceras have a broadly rounded cross section with its width greater than its height. Litoceras somewhat resembles the tarphyceratid Pionoceras from the same time, except for the siphuncle being dorsal and in the center.

== Species ==
Species within the genera Litoceras include:

- Litoceras calciferum (Billings, 1865)
- Litoceras versutum (Billings, 1865)
- Litoceras whiteavsi Hyatt, 1894
