= Baeopleuroceras =

Baeopleuroceras Temporal range: Middle Devonian

Scientific classification
- Kingdom: Animalia
- Phylum: Mollusca
- Class: Cephalopoda
- Subclass: Nautiloidea
- Order: †Tarphycerida
- Family: †Nephriticeratidae
- Genus: †Baeopleuroceras; Willians, 1935

Extinct genus of molluscs

Baeopleuroceras is a genus included in the Barrandeoceroid family Nephriticeratidae, found in Middle Devonian sediments in eastern North America (NY, Penn, Ont.)

The shell of Baeopleuroceras is a short, rapidly expanding cyrtocone, curved through at least 90 degrees. The body chamber is one half the overall shell length. The siphuncle is subcentral with segments slightly expanded into the chambers.

Rhadinoceras and Nephriticeras are somewhat similar genera from within the Nephriticeratidae, except that in both the siphuncle is displaced between the center and the dorsum.
