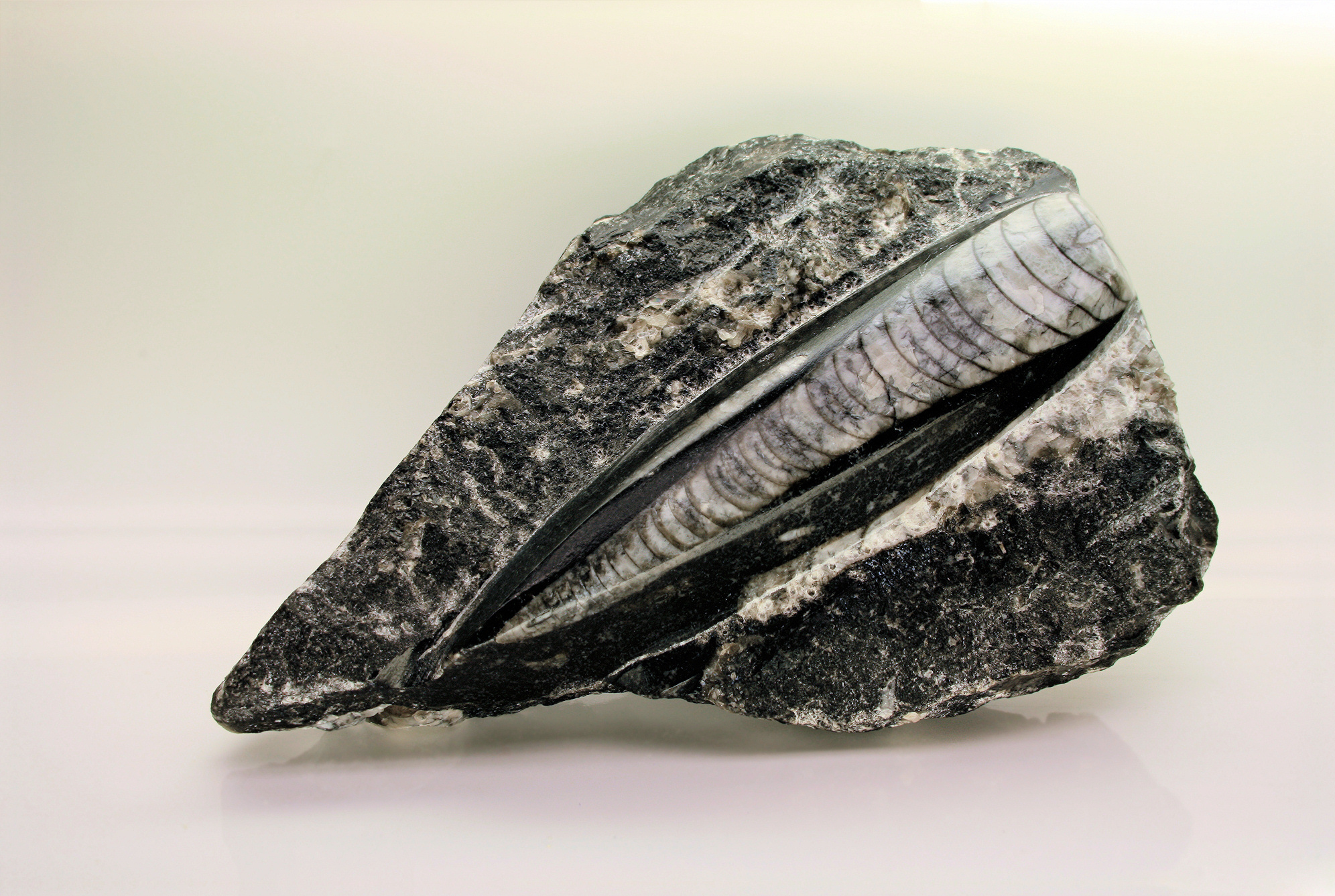
- Fossil of Geisonoceras species

Scientific classification
- Kingdom: Animalia
- Phylum: Mollusca
- Class: Cephalopoda
- Order: †Orthocerida
- Family: †Geisonoceratidae; Zhuravleva, 1959

Genera
- †Angeisonoceras; †Columenoceras; †Geisonoceras; †Harrisoceras; †Joachimoceras; †Jonesoceras; †Nilssonoceras; †Ordogeisonoceras; †Protokionoceras; †Striacoceras; †Temperoceras; †Ugooloceras; †Virgoceras

= Geisonoceratidae =

Geisonoceratidae Temporal range: Middle Ordovician–Middle Devonian

Extinct family of cephalopod molluscs

Geisonoceratidae is an extinct family of orthoceroid cephalopods endemic to what would be Asia, Europe, and North America from the Middle Ordovician to the Middle Devonian, living from about 470—380 mya, existing for approximately 90 million years.

Zhuravlevia was previously thought to be a member of this group, but was later reassigned to Mixosiphonata in 2017.

== Morphology ==
Shells of geisonoceratids are orthoconic or cyrtoconic, that is long and either straight or curved, with a subcircular cross section. The siphuncle, which varies in position from central to subventral, is composed of generally short, straight to slightly curved, orthochoanitic to subchoanitic, septal necks and thin connecting rings that may expand slightly into the chambers. Organic deposits that are formed within consist of either ring-like annuli restricted to the septal openings or which extend toward the front along the next connecting ring. In advanced species these may form a continuous lining. Cameral deposits, which are generally well developed, are formed along the front and backside of the septa, referred to as episeptal and hyposeptal. Surface modifications found in some include transverse annulations or transverse and sometimes also longitudinal striae and/or lirae.

== Taxonomy ==
Geisonoceratidae was named by Zhuravleva (1959) and included in the Orthocerataceae in Teichert et al. (1964) and by Evans (1994 & 1996), and simply in the Orthocerida in Evans(2005). Flower in his 1962 discussion of the Michelinoceratida expressed doubt as to the usefulness of this taxon and called attention to the morphologic gradation between the Michelinoceratidae in which cameral deposits are retarded and the Geistonoceratidae in which they are more advanced.
