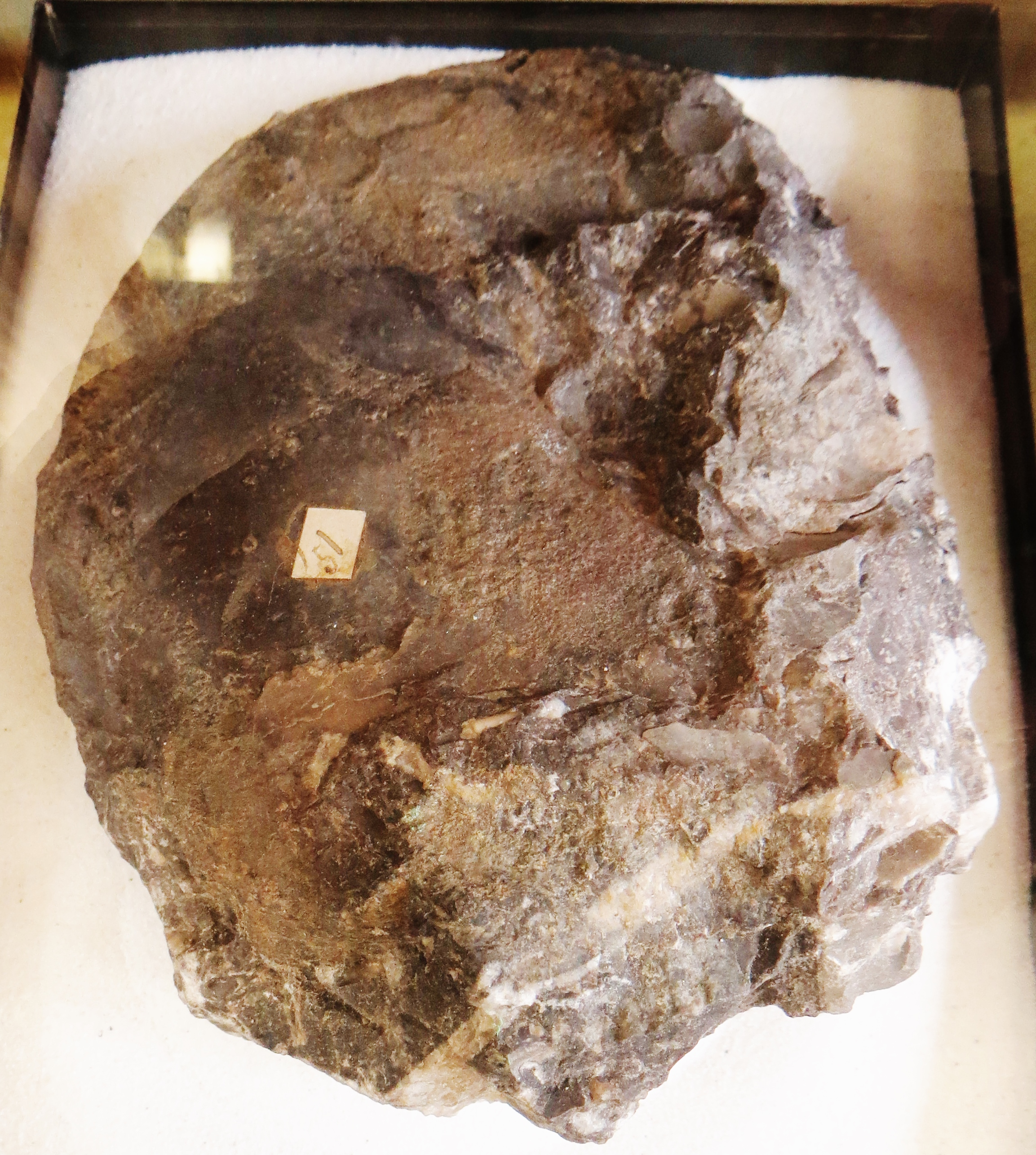
- Barrandeoceras bohemicum

Scientific classification
- Domain: Eukaryota
- Kingdom: Animalia
- Phylum: Mollusca
- Class: Cephalopoda
- Subclass: Nautiloidea
- Order: †Tarphycerida
- Suborder: †Barrandeocerina
- Family: †Barrandeoceratidae; Foeste, 1925

= Barrandeoceratidae =

Barrandeoceratidae Temporal range: M Ordovician - m Devonian

Extinct family of molluscs

The Barrandeoceratidae is a family of coiled nautiloids included in the Tarphycerida (sensu lato) that lived from the Middle Ordovician to the Middle Devonian, characterised by mostly compressed shells with a subcentral siphuncle composed of thin-walled segments that may become secondarily ventral.(Flower and Kummel 1950, Sweet 1964).

The Barrandeoceratidae are derived from the tarphyceratid genus, Centrotarphyceras through Barrandeoceras (Flower 1984), and is the source for the Uranoceratidae and Nephriticeratidae. These three families form the barrandeoceratid group. Sometimes a fourth family, the Bickmoritidae, is added, based on the genus Bickmorites.

Genera (Flower 1984) include Barrandeoceras, Centrocyrtoceras, Paquettoceras, Savageoceras, Gasconsoceras, Haydenoceras, and Paraplectoceras; and if included, Bickmorites. Avilionella and Laureloceras, included in the Barrandeocerida in the Treatise on Invertebrate Paleontology Part K (1964) have been removed to the Plectoceratidae.
