= Hardmanoceras =

Hardmanoceras Temporal range: uL Ordovician

Scientific classification
- Kingdom: Animalia
- Phylum: Mollusca
- Class: Cephalopoda
- Subclass: Nautiloidea
- Order: †Tarphycerida
- Family: †Trocholitidae
- Genus: †Hardmanoceras; Teichert & Glenister, 1952

Extinct genus of molluscs

Hardmanoceras is a tarphycerid genus belonging to the Trocholitidae from the upper Lower Ordovician to possibly the lower Middle Ordovician, found in Western Australia. Hardmanoceras is like Discoceras but prominently ribbed and with a depressed whorl section. The body, or living, chamber is long, 1 1/8 volutions long. The ultimate portion is slightly divergent, not an uncommon characteristic of tarphycerids.

Hardmanoceras was named by Teichert and Glenister in 1952. The type is Hardmanoceras lobatum.
