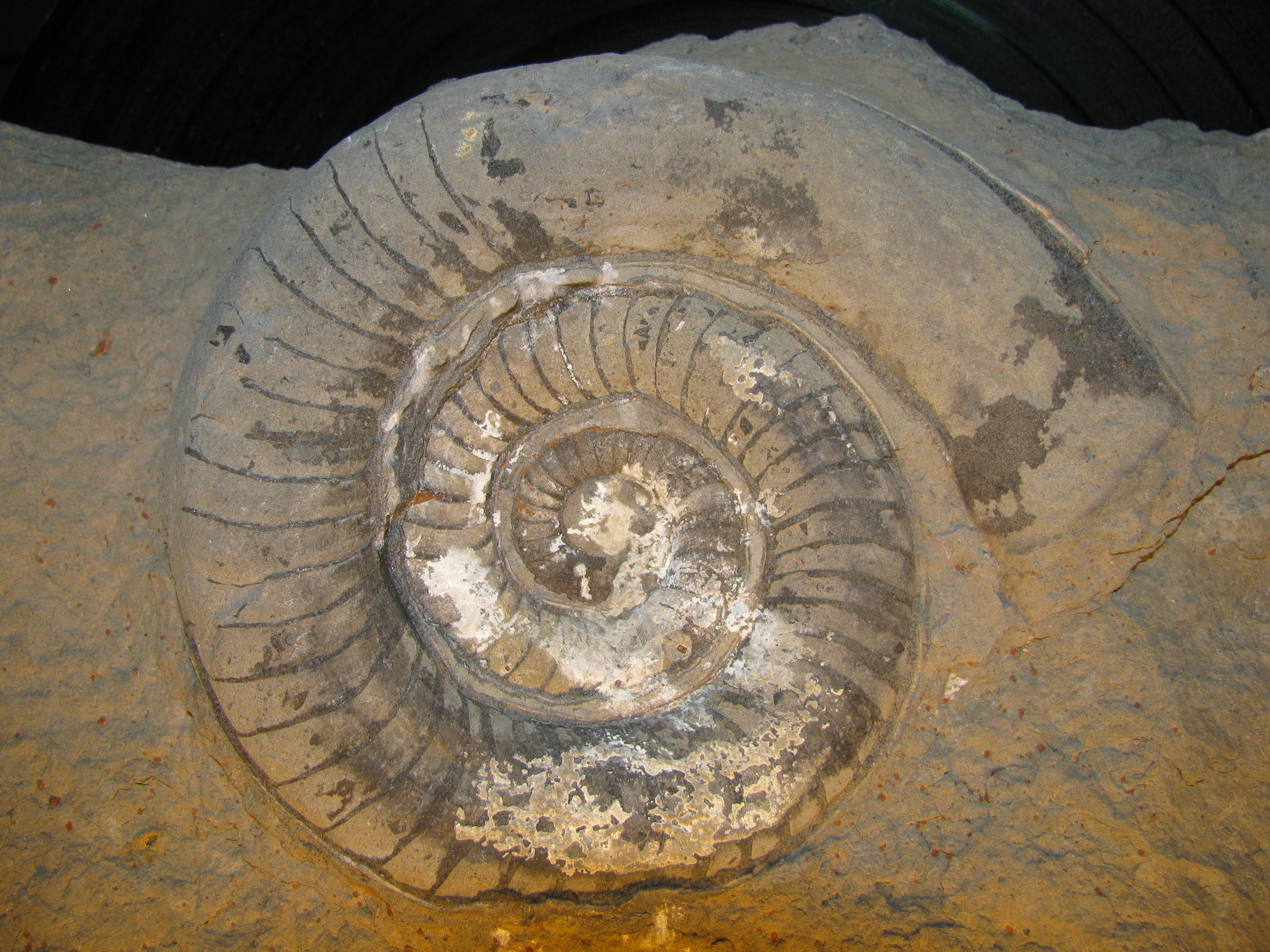

Scientific classification
- Domain: Eukaryota
- Kingdom: Animalia
- Phylum: Mollusca
- Class: Cephalopoda
- Subclass: Nautiloidea
- Order: †Tarphycerida
- Family: †Trocholitidae
- Genus: †Discoceras; Barrande, 1867

= Discoceras =

Discoceras Temporal range: M-U Ordovician

Extinct genus of nautiloids

Discoceras is an extinct marine cephalopod mollusk, a member of the Trocholitidae in the Tarphycerida. It is distinct from Discosorus, It is characterized by closely coiled, gradually expanding shells with a subquadrate cross section, that may be ribbed or smooth. The sides are broadly rounded; the venter is wide and slightly rounded. The maximum width is slightly dorsal of the middle. The dorsum has a slight to moderate impression. The siphuncle starts off central for the first half whorl then becomes marginodorsal in the succeeding two whorls, then subdorsal at maturity. As with Trocholites, the dorsal siphuncle in Discoceras probably indicates an orientation during life that places the back of the living chamber high in the shell.

Discoceras has been found in Middle and Upper Ordovician sediments in Northern Europe, Baffin Island in Canada, Yunnan and Hubei provinces in China, and in Punjab, India.

== See also ==
- List of nautiloids
