= Ohioceras =

Ohioceras Temporal range: M Silurian

Scientific classification
- Kingdom: Animalia
- Phylum: Mollusca
- Class: Cephalopoda
- Order: †Orthocerida
- Family: †Kionoceratidae
- Genus: †Ohioceras; Shimazu & Obata, 1935

Ohioceras is an extinct genus of suborthochonic nautiloids from the Silurian of Ohio belonging to the orthoceroid family Kionoceratidae.

Ohioceras is characterized by a slightly curved longiconic shell with a circular to slightly depressed cross-section. The surface is lined with broad, low, longitudinal ribs separated by distinct shallow grooves. The siphuncle is subcentral, apparently orthochoanitic.
