= Tarphyceras =

Tarphyceras Temporal range: L Ordovician

Scientific classification
- Kingdom: Animalia
- Phylum: Mollusca
- Class: Cephalopoda
- Subclass: Nautiloidea
- Order: †Tarphycerida
- Family: †Tarphyceratidae
- Genus: †Tarphyceras; Hyatt, 1894

Extinct genus of molluscs

Tarphyceras is a genus of tarphyceratid with whorls rounded in cross section, having a deeply impressed dorsum and a ventral to subcentral siphuncle, known from the Lower Ord (U Canad) of North America. It differs from Campbelloceras in that Campbelloceras is only slightly impressed, from Centrotarphyceras in that Centrotarphyceras is subquadrate and has a central siphuncle, and from Trocholites in that although Trocholites is subcircular in cross section, the siphuncle is subdorsal.

Taphyceras may be derived from Campbelloceras through development of tighter coiling and a deeper impression along with a smaller siphuncle that may be further offset from the venter.

Tarphyceras was named by Hyatt in 1894.
