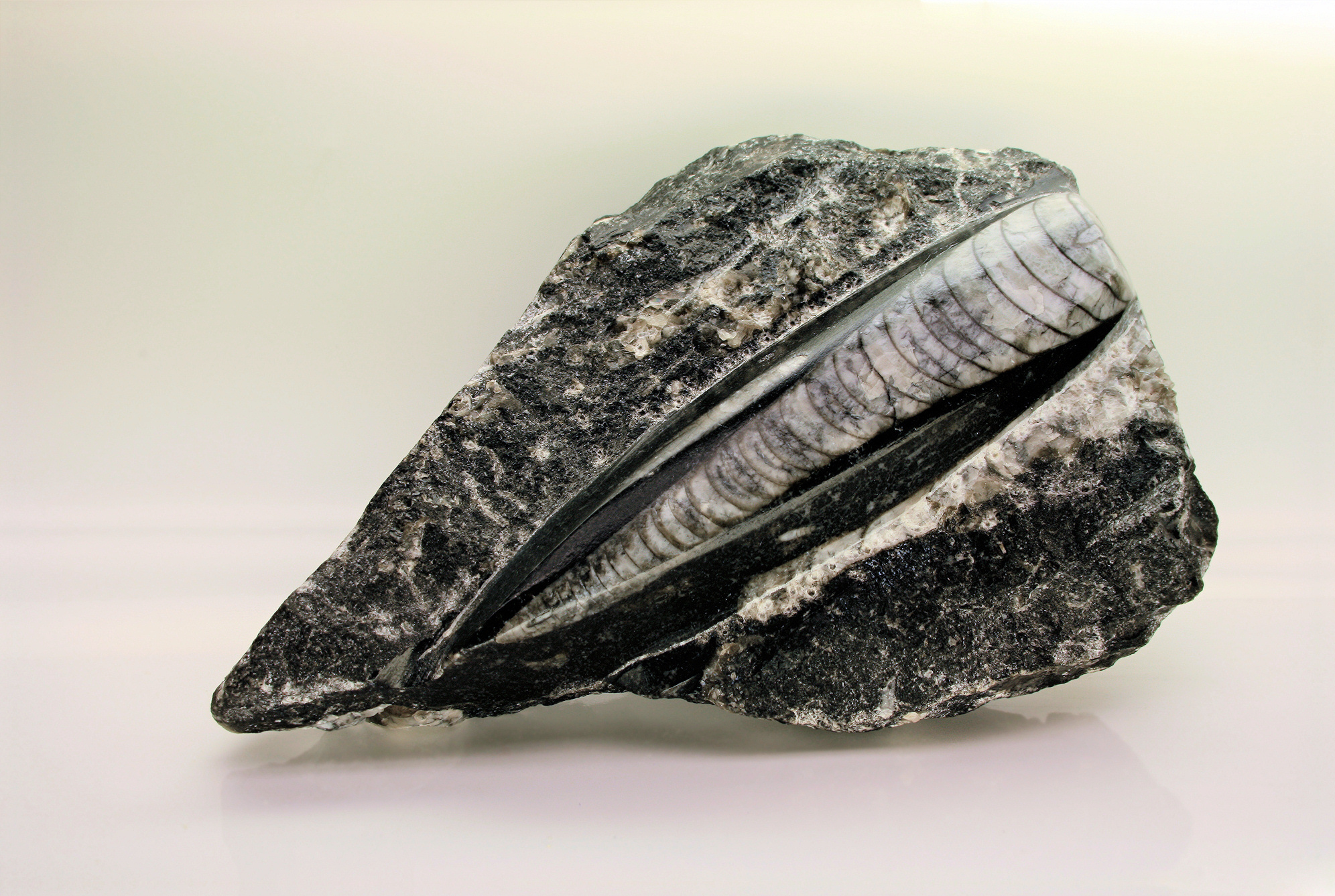
- Fossil of Geisonoceras species

Scientific classification
- Domain: Eukaryota
- Kingdom: Animalia
- Phylum: Mollusca
- Class: Cephalopoda
- Order: †Orthocerida
- Family: †Geisonoceratidae
- Genus: †Geisonoceras; Hyatt, 1884

= Geisonoceras =

Geisonoceras Temporal range: Middle Ordovician - Middle Devonian

Extinct genus of nautiloids

Geisonoceras is an extinct orthocerid genus named by Hyatt, 1884, and type for the Geisonoceratidae established by Zhuravleva in 1959.

== Fossil record ==
Fossils of Geisonoceras are found in marine strata from the Ordovician until the Devonian (age range: from 460.9 to 383.7 million years ago.). Fossils are known from various localities in Europe, North America and Asia.

== Species ==
- †Geisonoceras heintzi Strand 1934
- †Geisonoceras maclareni Murchison 1859
- †Geisonoceras shumardi Billings 1859
- †Geisonoceras wegelini Teichert 1930

== Description ==
Shells are elongate, straight or slightly curved, and slowly expanding with a circular or subcircular cross section, transverse aperture and slight hyponomic sinus. The surface has broad transverse bands with fine growth lines between. Sutures are straight, transverse or slightly oblique. The siphuncle is subcentral, necks short and straight, connecting rings slightly expanded into the chambers.
