= Plectoceratidae =

Plectoceratidae Temporal range: Mid -Late Ordovician -?Mid Silurian

Scientific classification
- Domain: Eukaryota
- Kingdom: Animalia
- Phylum: Mollusca
- Class: Cephalopoda
- Subclass: Nautiloidea
- Order: †Tarphycerida
- Suborder: †Barrandeocerina
- Family: †Plectoceratidae; Hyatt in Zittel, 1900

Genera
- See text

Family of nautiloids

The Plectoceratidae is a family of tarphycerids in the suborder Barrandeocerina established as a place for the genus Plectoceras; defined (Sweet 1964) simply as coiled, costate barrandeocerids with subcentral adult siphuncle.

According to Sweet, in the original Treatise Part K, the Plectoceratidae included only Plectoceras. Flower, 1984, however added six other genera, two new and four removed from both the Barrandeoceratidae and Apsidoceratidae. Genera according to Flower, 1984 are:

Plectoceras Hyatt -type genus
Avilionella -removed from Barradeoceratidae
Bodeiceras, Flower 1984. added
Chidleyenoceras - removed from the Apsidoceratidae
Metaplectoceras, Flower (?synonym for Plectoceras)
Laureloceras Flower 1957, removed from Barrandeoceratidae
Laurelplecoceras Flower 1984 -added

According to Flower, 1984, Plectoceras, and therefore the Plectoceratidae, is derived from the Tarphyceratid genus Campbelloceras while Barrandeoceras, and therefore the Barrandeoceratidae, is derived from Centrotarphyceras. The inclusion of Laureloceras expands the range of the Plectoceratidae into the Middle Silurian from the Upper Ordovician when it had been with only Plectoceras
