= Calocyrtoceras =

Calocyrtoceras Temporal range: Middle Silurian

Scientific classification
- Kingdom: Animalia
- Phylum: Mollusca
- Class: Cephalopoda
- Order: †Orthocerida
- Family: †Paraphragmitidae
- Genus: †Calocyrtoceras; Foerste 1936

Genus of molluscs

Calocyrtoceras is a genus of orthocerids (Cephalopoda, Nautiloidea), from the middle Silurian of North America (Quebec) and central Europe.

The shell, or conch, of Calocyrtoceras is generally characteristic of its family, the Paraphragmitidae, an annulated cyrtocone. In the case of Calocyrtoceras striated both transversely and longitudinally.

Similar Cyrtocycloceras from the Middle Silurian of Europe is only striated transversely while similar Gaspocyclocas from the Middle Silurian of North America is only striated longitudinally.
