= Uranoceras =

Uranoceras Temporal range: Middle Silurian

Scientific classification
- Domain: Eukaryota
- Kingdom: Animalia
- Phylum: Mollusca
- Class: Cephalopoda
- Subclass: Nautiloidea
- Order: †Tarphycerida
- Family: †Uranoceratidae
- Genus: †Uranoceras; Hyatt, 1884

Extinct genus of molluscs

Uranoceras is a barrandeocerid genus from the Middle Silurian belonging to the family Uranoceratidae, characterized by its loosely coiled, gyroconic shell of 1.5 to 2 subquadrate whorls.

The shell of Uranoceras is typically smooth but may have growth lines that form a hyponomic sinus on the venter. The Siphuncle is large, displaced slightly ventral from the center. Septal necks are straight; connecting rings cylindrical, thin, and strongly contracted where they meet the necks.

Uranoceras has been found in Indiana, Illinois, and Wisconsin in the United States; Anticosti Island in Canada; and in both central and northern Europe.

== See also ==
- List of nautiloids
