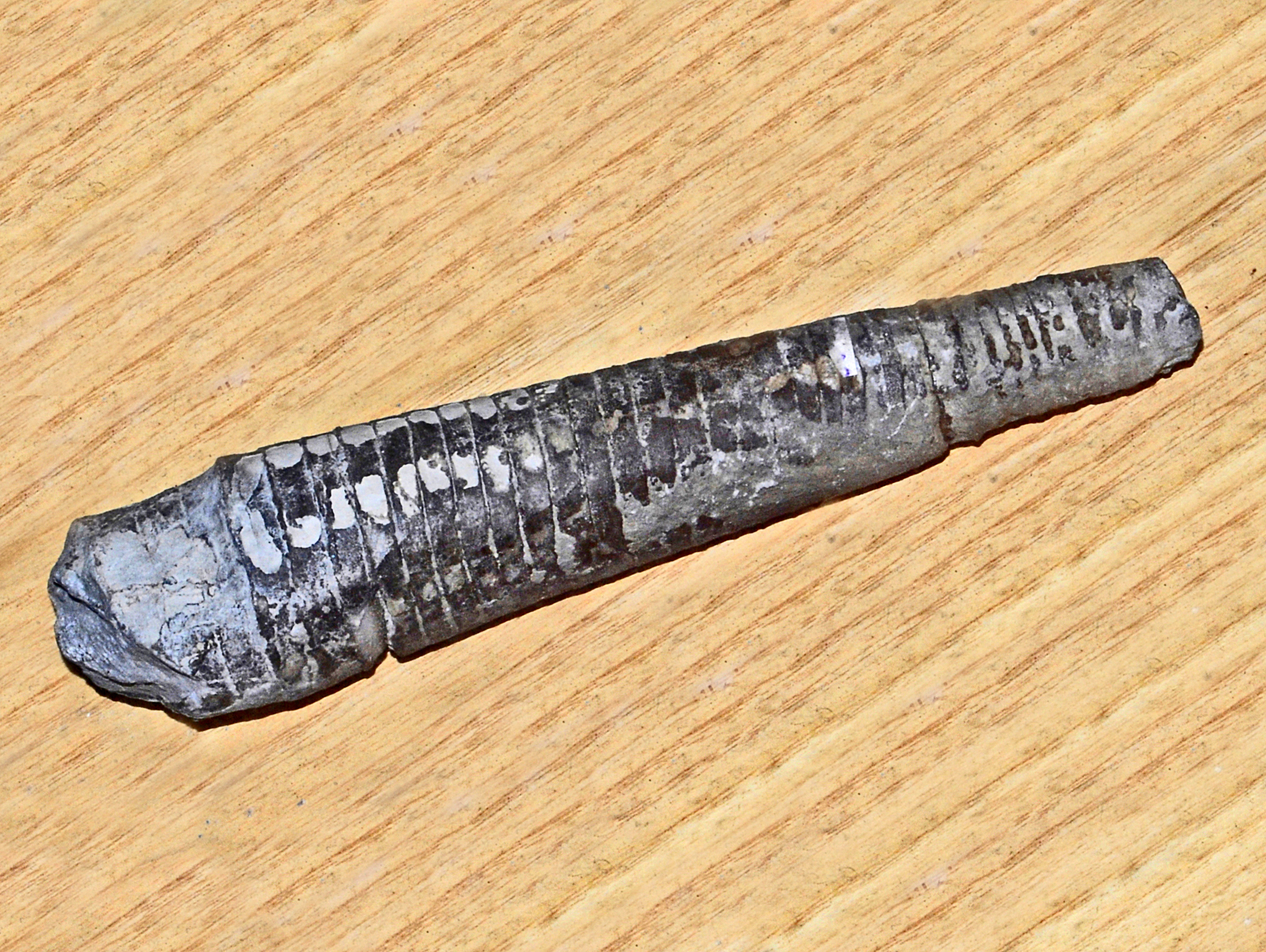
- Fossil of Treptoceras duseri

Scientific classification
- Domain: Eukaryota
- Kingdom: Animalia
- Phylum: Mollusca
- Class: Cephalopoda
- Order: †Orthocerida
- Family: †Proteoceratidae
- Genus: †Treptoceras; Flower 1942

= Treptoceras =

Treptoceras Temporal range: Ordovician

Extinct genus of molluscs

Treptoceras is a fossil cephalopod genus included in the orthocerid family Proteoceratidae.

== Fossil record ==
It has been found in Ordovician rocks dated from about 460.9 to 445.6 Ma in South Korea and United States.

== Species ==
- †Treptoceras cincinnatiensis Miller 1875
- †Treptoceras duseri Hall and Whitfield 1875
- †Treptoceras fosteri Miller 1875
- †Treptoceras transversum Miller 1875
- †Treptoceras yokoyamai Kobayashi 1927
