= Cliftonoceras =

Cliftonoceras Temporal range: Llandovery

Scientific classification
- Domain: Eukaryota
- Kingdom: Animalia
- Phylum: Mollusca
- Class: Cephalopoda
- Subclass: Nautiloidea
- Order: †Tarphycerida
- Family: †Uranoceratidae
- Genus: †Cliftonoceras; Flower, 1957

Species
- See text

Extinct genus of molluscs

Cliftonoceras is a genus of barrandeoceroid type tarphycerids from the Uranoceratidae characterized by a smooth gyroconic shell with a rounded dorsum and flattened venter, and by a subvental siphuncle composed of thin connecting rings and necks that are straight ventrally, recumbent dorsally.

Cliftonoceras has been found in Middle Silurian age sediments in Tennessee and Indiana. The type species is C. quadratum.
