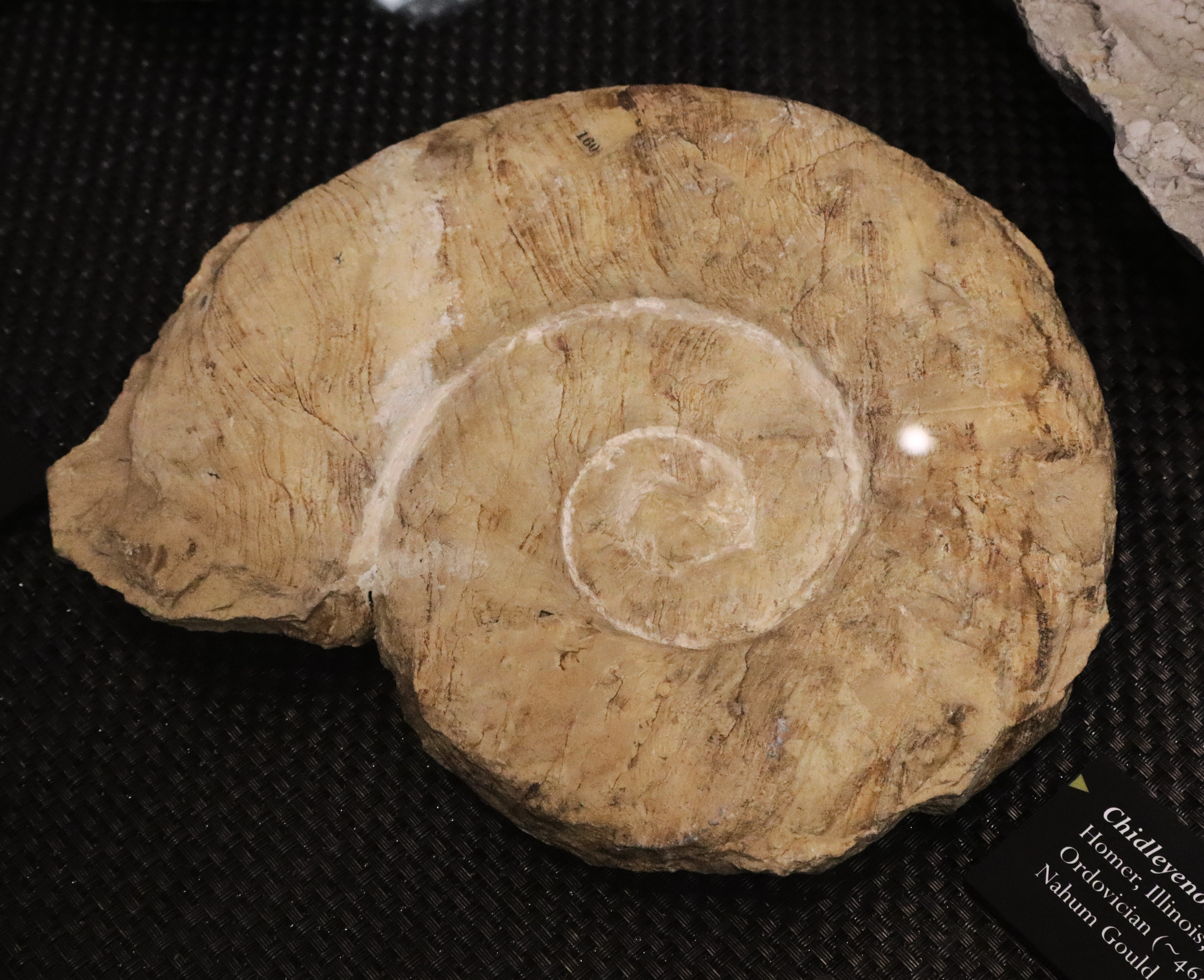
- Fossil specimen, Beneski Museum of Natural History

Scientific classification
- Kingdom: Animalia
- Phylum: Mollusca
- Class: Cephalopoda
- Subclass: Nautiloidea
- Order: †Tarphycerida
- Family: †Plectoceratidae
- Genus: †Chidleyenoceras; Shimizu & Obata, 1935

= Chidleyenoceras =

Chidleyenoceras Temporal range: Middle Ordovician

Extinct genus of molluscs

Chidleyenoceras is a Middle Ordovician tarphyceroid with a closely coiled, evolute shell; whorl section subquadrate, widest just above a broadly rounded venter; dorsum with a broad shallow impression; sutures moderately spaced, weakly sinuous; siphuncle large, subventral, apparently orthochoantitic with tubular segments.

The tubular, subventral siphuncle separates Chidleyenoceras from the Apsidoceratidae (Sweet, 1964) where it had been included and puts it well into the Plectoceratidae (Flower, 1984).
