= Fascifodina =

Fascifodina Temporal range: Ordovician

Trace fossil classification
- Ichnogenus: †Fascifodina; Osgood, 1970

Ichnospecies
- †Fascifodina floweri Osgood, 1970

Trace fossil

Fascifodina is a marine trace fossil of uncertain origin from the Ordovician of North America. It has either been interpreted as arm traces of an orthocerid cephalopod or interconnected burrows of an unknown animal.
