= Jolietoceras =

Jolietoceras Temporal range: Middle Silurian

Scientific classification
- Domain: Eukaryota
- Kingdom: Animalia
- Phylum: Mollusca
- Class: Cephalopoda
- Subclass: Nautiloidea
- Order: †Tarphycerida
- Family: †Uranoceratidae
- Genus: †Jolietoceras; Foerste, 1925

Extinct genus of molluscs

Jolietoceras is a compressed, annulate, lituiconic nautiloid included in the derived Tarphycerid family, Uranoceratidae. The shell is gyroconic in the early stage, becoming straight and more rapidly expanded in the later. sutures are straight and transverse. Surface annuli slope strongly to the rear, dorso-ventrally, in the early gyroconic stage but a lacking in the later straight segment.

Jolietoceras comes from the Middle Silurian of the United States (Illinois, Wisconsin).

The Uranoceratidae, including Jolietoceras, were one included in the Barrandeocerida (Sweet, 1964), which has since been incorporated into the Tarphycerida.
