= Gangshanoceras =

Gangshanoceras Temporal range: Ordovician

Scientific classification
- Domain: Eukaryota
- Kingdom: Animalia
- Phylum: Mollusca
- Class: Cephalopoda
- Order: †Orthocerida
- Family: †Proteoceratidae
- Genus: †Gangshanoceras; Zou, 1988

Type species
- Gangshanoceras jurongense Zou, 1988

Species
- Gangshanoceras densum Zou, 1988; Gangshanoceras guichinense Ying, 1989; Gangshanoceras jurongense Zou, 1988; Gangshanoceras villicumense Kröger et al. 2007; Gangshanoceras wennanense Ying, 1989; Gangshanoceras sp.

Extinct genus of molluscs

Gangshanoceras is a fossil nautiloid cephalopod genus included in the orthocerid family Proteoceratidae. It has been found in Ordovician rocks dated from about 478.5 to 468 Ma in China, and from rocks dated slightly younger, about 468 to 461 Ma in Argentina. It has five described species. The type is Gangshanoceras jurongense.
