= Cumingsoceras =

Cumingsoceras Temporal range: Middle Silurian

Scientific classification
- Domain: Eukaryota
- Kingdom: Animalia
- Phylum: Mollusca
- Class: Cephalopoda
- Subclass: Nautiloidea
- Order: †Tarphycerida
- Family: †Uranoceratidae
- Genus: †Cumingsoceras; Flower, 1950

Extinct genus of molluscs

Cummingsoceras is a genus of barrandeoceroids within the Tarphycerida, included in the family Uranoceratidae. Its shell is a rapidly expanding gyrocone of about 1.5 narrowly separated whorls.

The surface is faintly cancellated by slight longitudinal lines that cross growth lines which define a deep hyponomic sinus. The siphuncle is small, subcentral, and with recumbent necks.

Cummingsoceras is known from the middle Silurian of Indiana and Illinois.
