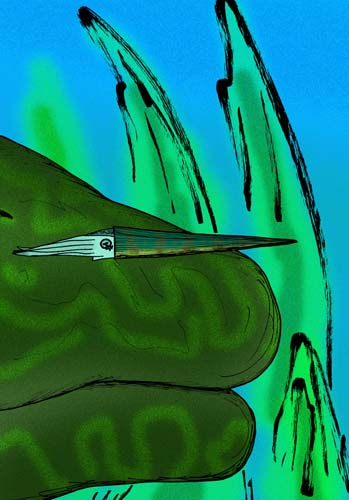
- Gorgonoceras visendum

Scientific classification
- Domain: Eukaryota
- Kingdom: Animalia
- Phylum: Mollusca
- Class: Cephalopoda
- Order: †Orthocerida
- Family: †Lamellorthoceratidae; Teichert 1961

Genera
- Arthrophyllum; Gorgonoceras; Lamellorthoceras

= Lamellorthoceratidae =

Lamellorthoceratidae Temporal range: Lower Devonian - ? Lower Carboniferous

Extinct family of molluscs

Lamellorthoceratidae is a family of fossil orthoceratoids in the Orthocerida, defined by Curt Teichert in 1961. The lamellorthoceratids are placed in the superfamily Orthocerataceae in the Treatise on Invertebrate Paleontology (Walter Sweet, 1964).

Lamellorthoceratids are distinguished by cameral deposits consisting of simple or bifurcating episeptal, or rarely hyposeptal lamellae, set radially with respect to the siphuncle; often filling the entire posterior part of the shell. Lamellorthoceratid shells are straight or slightly endogastric with a slender, cylindrical subcentral orthochoanitic siphuncle, free or organic deposits.

The Lamellorthoceratidae are known from the Lower and Middle Devonian and possibly from the Lower Carboniferous, and is represented by three genera.

== Genera ==
- Lamellorthoceras, a lamellorthoceriatid from the lower and middle Devonian of North Africa (Algeria, Morocco) characterized by radial lamellae that tend to be wavy, twisted, or to have bifurcating inner edges. All chambers may be filled. Otherwise the genus is similar to Arthrophyllum (below). Lamellorthoceras was named and described by Termier & Termier in 1950.
- Arthrophyllum has slender, gradually expanding orthocones or faintly endogastic longicones, the surfaces of which are covered with close spaced sinuous transverse crenulations that form broad dorsal and ventral salients and lateral sinuses. Septa are shallow, sutures straight and transverse. Camerae contain episeptal deposits formed by longitudinal lamellae that radiate inwardly from the chamber walls and increase in bulk adapically so as to completely fill the entire apical chambers. Arthrophyllum was named and described by Beyrich in 1850 and is known from the Lower Devonian of Europe (France, Germany, Turkey). Tentative specimens are known from the Lower Carboniferous.
- Gorgonoceras is similar to Arthrophyllum except that the surface has faint longitudinal ribs, the eccentric siphuncle has a continuous endsiphuncular lining on the ventral side, and there is a ventral lamella that is much thicker than the other. Gorgonoceras is known from the Eifelian of the Sverlovsk district in Russia and was named and described by Zhuravleva in 1961.
