= Temperoceras =

Temperoceras Temporal range: Ordovician - Devonian

Scientific classification
- Kingdom: Animalia
- Phylum: Mollusca
- Class: Cephalopoda
- Order: †Orthocerida
- Family: †Geisonoceratidae
- Genus: †Temperoceras; Barskov, 1960

Extinct genus of molluscs

Temperoceras is a genus of orthoconic nautiloid cephalopods that lived in what is now north Africa, Europe, and Asia during the early Paleozoic. It was named by I. V. Barskov in 1960.

== Taxonomy ==
Temperoceras is included in the orthocerid family Geisonoceratidae the type is Orthoceras ludense

== Morphology ==
Temperoceras has an orthoconic shell with a tubular siphuncle that contains annular deposits that are restricted to or begin at the septal openings.

== Distribution ==
Temperoceras has been found in sediments ranging in age from Ordovician to Devonian in north Africa, southern Europe, and China.
