= Apsidoceratidae =

Apsidoceratidae Temporal range: Mid to Late Ordovician

Scientific classification
- Kingdom: Animalia
- Phylum: Mollusca
- Class: Cephalopoda
- Subclass: Nautiloidea
- Order: †Tarphycerida
- Suborder: †Barrandeocerina
- Family: †Apsidoceratidae; Hyatt, 1884

Extinct family of molluscs

The Apsidoceratidae is a family of Middle and Upper Ordovician Barrandeocerina, (a suborder of tarphycerids), characterized by curved or coiled, smooth, transversely marked, or laterally costate shells, with a conspicuous hyponomic sinus. Early whorl sections tend to be subtriangular; become broader and dorsally impressed in closely coiled forms. Sutures are with lateral lobes in primitive forms but are without lateral lobes, but with ventral lobes in more advanced species with broader sections. Siphuncles are between the center and ventral margin, but not close to either.

Genera remaining in the Apsidoceratidae include:

Apsidoceras
Charactoceras
Charactocerina
Deckeroceras
Fremontoceras
Wilsonoceras

Chidleyenoceras, previously assigned, tentatively, to the Apsidoceratidae has been reassigned (Flower, 1984) to the Plectoceratidae.
