= Engorthoceratidae =

Engorthoceratidae Temporal range: Devonian

Scientific classification
- Domain: Eukaryota
- Kingdom: Animalia
- Phylum: Mollusca
- Class: Cephalopoda
- Order: †Orthocerida
- Family: †Engorthoceratidae; Flower, 1962
- Genus: †Engorthoceras; Flower, 1962

Extinct family of molluscs

Engorthoceratidae is a small family of Devonian orthocerids and a class of cephalopod found in eastern North America (Ohio and Indiana), containing only the genus Engorthoceras.

== Taxonomy ==
Engorthoceratidae was named in 1962 by Rousseau Flower to contain the genus Engorthoceras, also named by Flower (1962), and assigned to the Michelinceratida. The genotype is Orthoceras worthoni.

== Morphology ==
Engorthoceras produced straight conical shells with a subcircular cross section and a small completely marginal siphuncle. The conical shell is suggestive of belemnite phragmocones and of its possible ancestry to Eobelemites. Nothing is known of the animal itself.
