= Joachimoceras =

Joachimoceras Temporal range: Silurian

Scientific classification
- Domain: Eukaryota
- Kingdom: Animalia
- Phylum: Mollusca
- Class: Cephalopoda
- Order: †Orthocerida
- Family: †Geisonoceratidae
- Genus: †Joachimoceras; Barskov, 1960

Extinct genus of molluscs

Jaochimoceras is a genus of orthoceroid cephalopods from the Silurian of Central Europe (Bohemia) named by Baskov, 1960, and included in the Geisonoceratidae. As with the orthocerids, its shell is longiconic, siphuncle more or less central, and chambers somewhat long.

Note that Flower, 1976, regarded the Orthoceratidae and Geisonoceratidae as forming a continuous series, indivisible into separate families.
