= Avilionella =

Avilionella Temporal range: Middle Ordovician

Scientific classification
- Kingdom: Animalia
- Phylum: Mollusca
- Class: Cephalopoda
- Subclass: Nautiloidea
- Order: †Tarphycerida
- Family: †Plectoceratidae
- Genus: †Avilionella; Flower, 1952

Avilionella is a Middle Ordovician tarphyceroid genus consisting of closely coiled, compressed shells with a small perforation in the center, shallow dorsal impression, and subventral tubular siphuncle with thin connecting rings. Chambers are very short, separated by closely spaced, dish-shaped septa. Coiling becomes loose in the mature, adoral, part of the shell.

The subventral, tubular siphuncle along with the looser coiling in the mature portion of the shell and perforation at the center put Avilionella in the Plectoceratidae (Flower, 1984) rather than in the Barrandeoceratidae (Sweet 1964) where it had been placed earlier. It has been found the New York and Ontario.
