= Laureloceras =

Laureloceras Temporal range: Silurian

Scientific classification
- Kingdom: Animalia
- Phylum: Mollusca
- Class: Cephalopoda
- Subclass: Nautiloidea
- Order: †Tarphycerida
- Family: †Plectoceratidae
- Genus: †Laureloceras; Flower, 1943

Extinct genus of molluscs

Laureloceras is a genus of the tarphycerid family Plectoceratidae that lived during the Middle Silurian in what is now North America.

The shell of Laureloceras is a smooth, slender, compressed cyrtocone or gyrocone with the venter more narrowly rounded than the dorsum. Sutures are transverse but may form broad lateral lobes. The siphuncle is subventral - close to the outer rim; necks are straight, connecting rings slightly expanded into the chambers. Cameral and siphonal deposits are lacking.

Laureloceras was previously included in the Barrandeoceratidae (Flower, 1950, Sweet, 1964) but was removed (Flower, 1984) primarily on the bases of the subventral siphuncle (Barrandeoceratid siphuncles are central - subcentral. Reassignment to the Tarphycerida from the Barrandeocerida is based on barrandeoceratid taxa being polyphyletic (having more than one common ancestor). Barrandeocerina is retained as a parking place for evolved tarphycerids with thin connecting rings.
