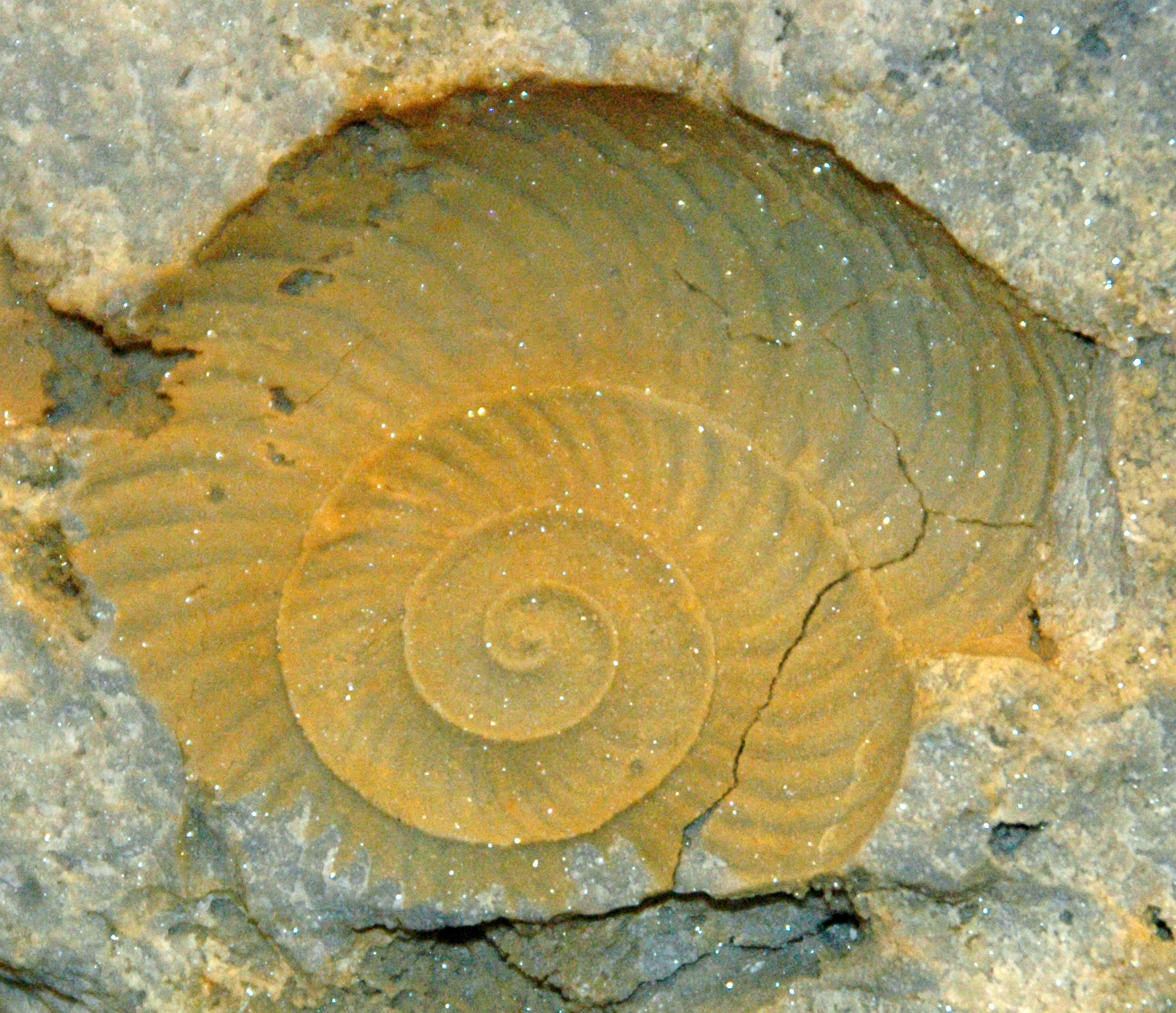
- Graftonoceras sp.

Scientific classification
- Domain: Eukaryota
- Kingdom: Animalia
- Phylum: Mollusca
- Class: Cephalopoda
- Subclass: Nautiloidea
- Order: †Tarphycerida
- Family: †Trocholitidae; Chapman, 1857

= Trocholitidae =

Trocholitidae Temporal range: LOrdovician(Jeffersonian)-USilurian(Niagaran)

Extinct family of nautiloids

The Trocholitidae are Tarphycerida with whorls in close contact as with the Tarphyceratidae, but in which the siphuncle, similar in structure, becomes dorsal. The Trocholitidae are derived from the Tarphyceratidae, perhaps from different tarphyceratids.

Members of the Trocholitidae vary in whorl section and siphuncle position. Most are tightly coiled with the dorsum impressed to some degree. As exceptions Arkoceras and Wichitoceras have their whorls touching but without a dorsal impression. Discoceras and Curtoceras have somewhat subquadrate whorl sections and are moderately impressed. In Graftonoceras and Jasperoceras the venter is rounded and continues smoothly through the flanks to a broad dorsum which in each is moderately impressed. The siphuncle in Graftonoceras is on the dorsal margin, in Jasperoceras it is between the center and dorsum. Whorls in Trocholites have a wide cross section and low profile, in Wichitoceras they are laterally compressed resulting in a high-profile. Litoceras has a broad cross section and a deeply impressed dorsum. As with Discoceras and Curtoceras the siphuncle is between the center and dorsum.

Arkoceras, Trocholitoceras, and Wichitoceras are limited to the upper Lower Ordovician, along with the enigmatic Beekmanoceras which may or may not belong. Curtoceras, Litoceras, and Hardmanoceras begin in the Lower Ordovician and continue into the middle of the Period, Hardmanoceras questionably. Jasperoceras is known only from the Middle Ordovician; Trocholites and Discoceras from the Middle and Upper. Graftonoceras comes from the Upper Silurian. Hardmanoceras which is strongly ribbed may be the ancestor of the Ophidioceratidae of the Upper Silurian

== Trocholitid genera ==
Genera assigned to the Trocholitidae are found in three principal realms: North America, Australia, and Northern Europe (Balto-Scandia).

Genera known only from North America

- Beekmanoceras: Tiny, fragmentary cyrtocones from the uL Ordovician of New York state, presumed exogastric with a dorsal siphuncle; Flower (1964) thought they were endogastric ellesmeroceratids.
- Jasperoceras: Subglobular, rapidly expanded, weakly ribbed, whorls uniformly rounded across flanks and venter, dorsum well impressed, siphuncle proportionally large, subdorsal, known only from the Middle Ordovician of Arkansas
- Litoceras: Fairly large, tightly coiled, with broadly rounded whorls and a deeply impressed dorsum, found in the upper Lower and lower Middle Ordovician of Newfoundland, whorl section similar to that of Pionoceras (Tarphyceratidae) except for the position of the siphuncle
- Wichitoceras: Small, laterally compressed, with a narrowly rounded venter and slightly impressed dorsum, widespread in the uL Ordovician of USA, cross section similar to Shumardoceras (Estonioceratidae)

Genera known from North America and Europe

- Curtoceras: Gradually expanded with a divergent mature body chamber, whorls moderately impressed, subquadrate in section, siphuncle subdorsal after the first volution
- Discoceras: Gradually expanded, smooth or ribbed, dorsum slightly to moderately impressed, siphuncle starts off central, becomes subdorsal in the first half volution, has also been found in China
- Trocholites: Gradually expanded, weakly ribbed, whorl section broad and smoothly rounded, dorsum with broad shallow impression, siphuncle submarginal

Genera known from North America and Australia

- Arkoceras: Somewhat rapidly expanded, whorls in contact but without dorsal impression, cross section subcircular (resembles Picnoceras (Estonioceratidae), siphuncle small, subdorsal
- Trocholitoceras: Gradually expanded, weakly ribbed, like Trocholites except for being deeply impressed and the siphuncle being close to the dorsum in all but the innermost volution
