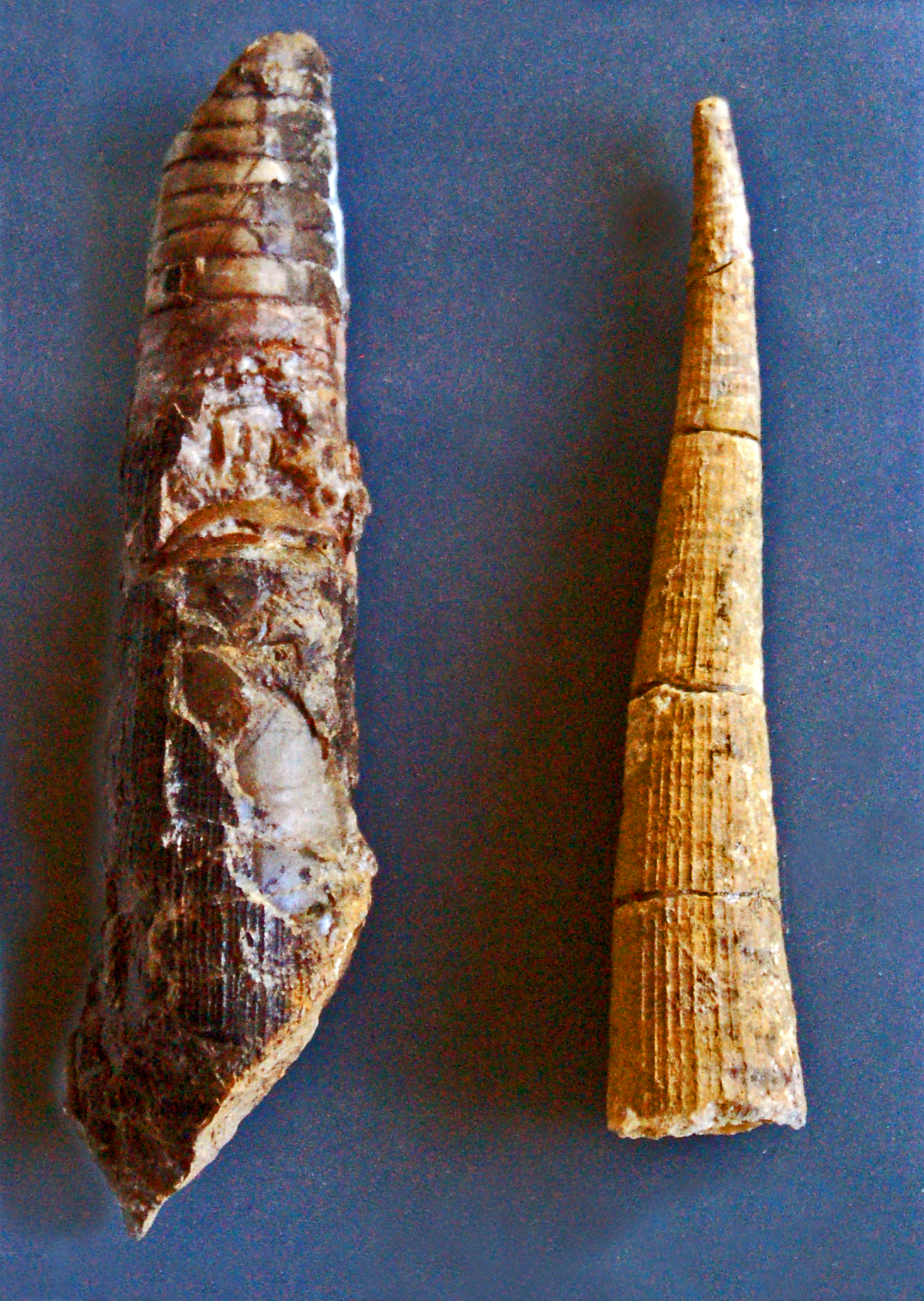
- Kionoceras doricum from Czech Republic at the National Museum (Prague)

Scientific classification
- Kingdom: Animalia
- Phylum: Mollusca
- Class: Cephalopoda
- Order: †Orthocerida
- Family: †Orthoceratidae
- Genus: †Kionoceras; Hyatt(1844)

= Kionoceras =

Kionoceras Temporal range: Middle Ordovician–Lopingian

Extinct genus of nautiloids

Kionoceras is an extinct nautiloid cephalopod genus included in the orthocerid family Kionoceratidae with scattered worldwide distribution from the Middle Ordovician to the Lower Permian. Kionoceratids are orthocerids with prominent longitudinal ornamentation on their shells, sometimes augmented by secondary transverse ornamentation. Orthocerids are, of course, prehistoric nautiloides with generally straight and elongate shells, mostly with central or subcentral siphuncles. (Sweet 1964)

Kionoceras is characterized by long, slender to rapidly expanding, shells with prominent longitudinal ribs separated by concave interspaces and, often, less conspicuous longitudinal and transverse lirae and striae. The siphuncle is central or subcentral, generally orthochoanitic; empty in Silurian type-species and in most from the Ordovician, but with annulosiphonate deposits in some from the Silurian and later.

Kionoceras is found in North America, Europe, Asia, and Australia. The type-species Kionocers doricum comes from the Middle Silurian of Central Europe

== See also ==
- Nautiloid
  - List of nautiloids
