= Beekmanoceras =

Beekmanoceras Temporal range: Late Ordovician

Scientific classification
- Kingdom: Animalia
- Phylum: Mollusca
- Class: Cephalopoda
- Subclass: Nautiloidea
- Genus: †Beekmanoceras; Ulrich and Foeste, 1936

Genus of nautiloids

Beekmanoceras is a small cephalopod from the Middle Canadian Epoch of New York with a loosely coiled, gyroconic, shell in which the whorls are not in contact and the siphuncle is on the inner or concave side of the whorl. Furnish and Glenister (1964) placed Beekmanoceras in the Trocholitidae (Tarphycerida), interpreting the curvature to be ventral side convex, i.e. exogastastric and the siphuncle to be dorsal. Flower (1964) included Beekmanoceras in the Ellesmeroceratidae believing the siphuncle to be ventral and the curvature to be endogastric with the ventral side concave.

Structural details of the genotype Beekmanoceras priscum the only species known, are obscure, allowing for different interpretations (ibid). A few things can be said however. No other trocholitids are known to have an openly coiled gyroconic shell which casts doubt on that placement. On the other hand, no endogastric forms are known for sure to have developed the kind of gyroconic coiling found in Beekmanoceras.
