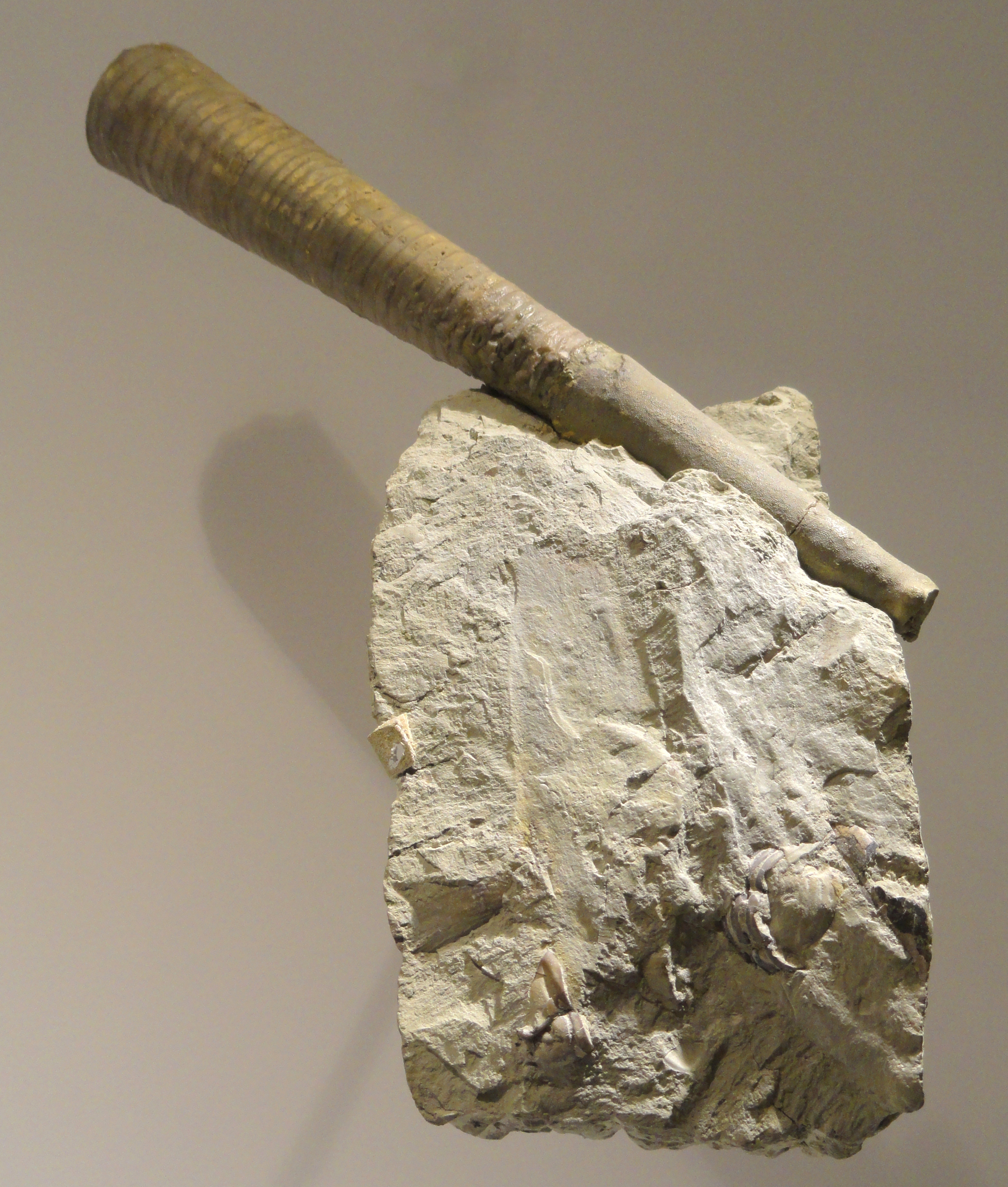
- Orthonybyoceras duseri

Scientific classification
- Kingdom: Animalia
- Phylum: Mollusca
- Class: Cephalopoda
- Order: †Orthocerida
- Family: †Proteoceratidae; Flower, 1962

= Proteoceratidae =

Proteoceratidae Temporal range: Middle Ordovician - Early Cretaceous

Extinct family of molluscs

Proteoceratidae is an extinct family of actively mobile aquatic carnivorous cephalopods belonging to the subclass Orthoceratoidea endemic to what would be Asia, Australia, Europe, South America and North America during the Ordovician living from 490—445.6 Ma, existing for approximately 44.4 million years.

== Taxonomy ==
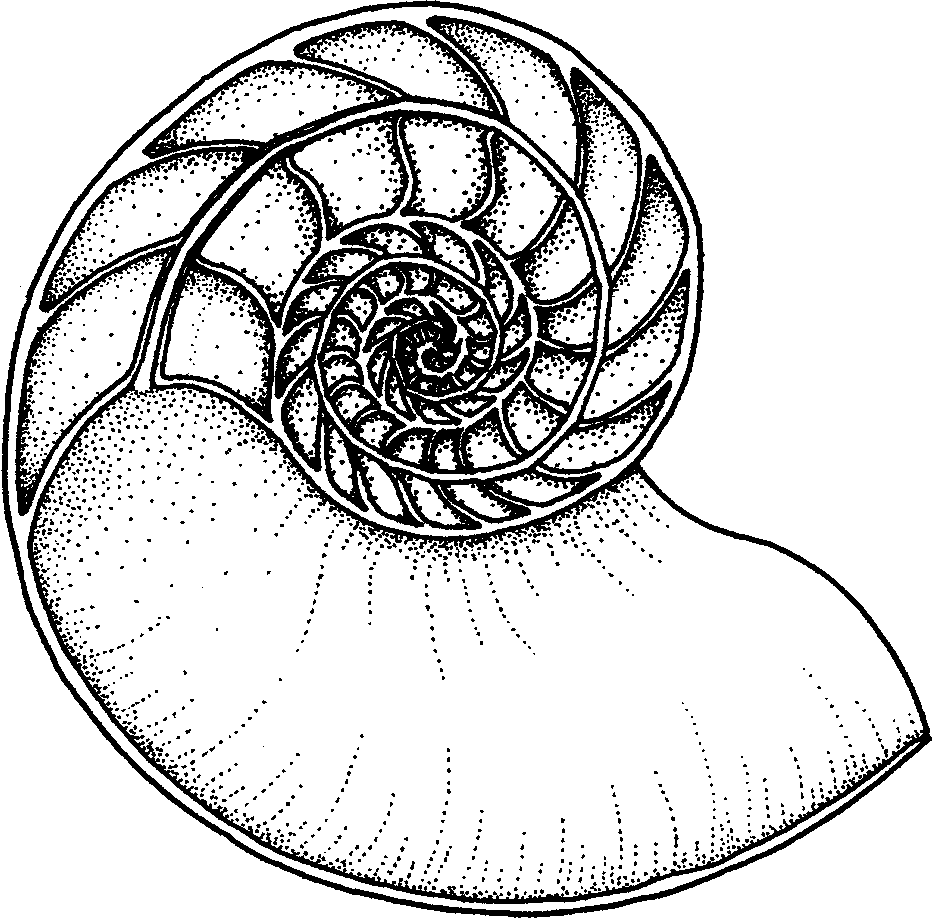
An image showing the siphuncle, the tube which connects the current living shell to the previous ones.

Proteoceratidae was named by Flower (1962). Its type is Proteoceras. It was assigned to Michelinoceratida by Flower (1962); to Pseudorthocerataceae by Teichert et al. (1964), Sweet (1964) and Evans (1994); to Pseudorthocerida by Kröger and Isakar (2006); and to Orthocerida by Kröger et al. (2007).

== Genera ==
- Archigeisonoceras
- Baykonuroceras
- Cyrtactinoceras
- Ephippiorthoceras
- Euorthoceras
- Gangshanoceras
- Gorbyoceras
- Isorthoceras
- Liulinoceras
- Mesnaquaceras
- Metephippiorthoceras
- Monomuchites
- Orthonybyoceras
- Paraproteoceras
- Proteoceras
- Pseudoliolinoceras
- Stereospyroceras
- Tofangoceras
- Transorthoceras
- Treptoceras
- Ulmioceras
