= Boggyoceras =

Boggyoceras Temporal range: Moscovian

Scientific classification
- Kingdom: Animalia
- Phylum: Mollusca
- Class: Cephalopoda
- Subclass: Nautiloidea
- Order: †Mixosiphonata
- Family: †Boggyoceratidae; Mutvei, 2017
- Genus: †Boggyoceras; Mutvei, 2017
- Species: †B. centrale

Binomial name
- †Boggyoceras centrale Mutvei, 2017

Extinct genus of cephalopods

Boggyoceras is an extinct genus of nautiloids that lived during the Carboniferous. It contains one valid species, Boggyoceras centrale. Its fossils have been found in the Boggy Formation of Oklahoma.
