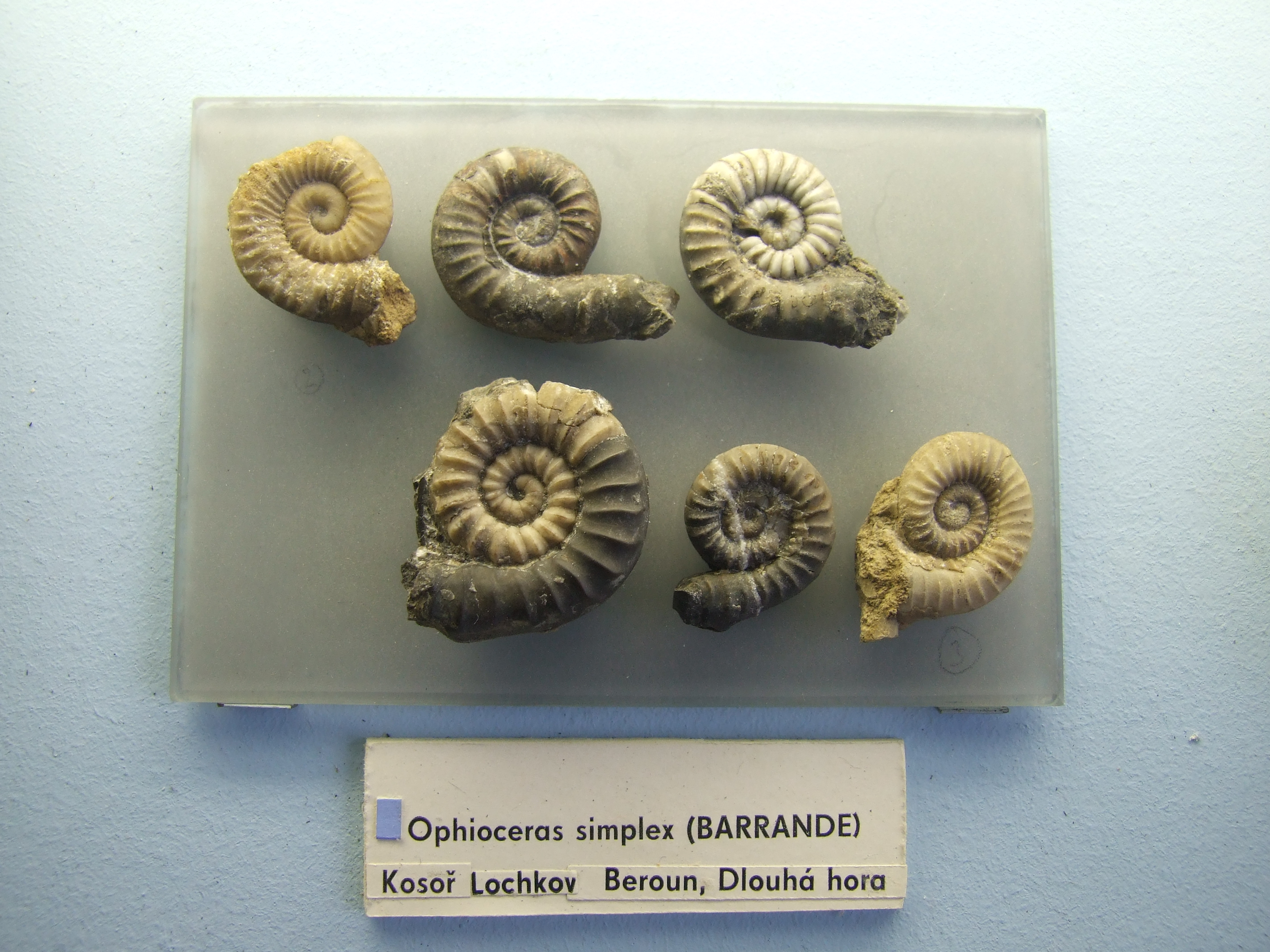
- Ophioceras simplex

Scientific classification
- Kingdom: Animalia
- Phylum: Mollusca
- Class: Cephalopoda
- Subclass: Nautiloidea
- Order: †Tarphycerida
- Family: †Ophidioceratidae; Hyatt, 1894
- Genus: †Ophioceras; Barrande, 1865

Synonyms
- Ophidioceras Barrande, 1867

= Ophioceras (cephalopod) =

Ophioceras Temporal range: Upper Silurian

Extinct genus of nautiloids

Ophioceras is a genus of closely coiled tarphycerid nautiloid cephalopods, the sole representatives of the family Ophidioceratidae, characterized by an evolute shell with narrow, subrounded, annulated whorls and a subcentral siphuncle composed of thin connecting rings that show no evidence of layering. The mature body chamber is strongly divergent and is the longest proportionally of any tarphycerid. The aperture has a deep hyponomic sinus and ocular sinuses, and so resembles some lituitids.

Ophioceras seem to have its origin in the Trocholitidae, possibly in Graftonoceras.

Ophioceras has a narrow, evolutely wound, closely coiled shell that diverges in the adult stage. The shell is more or less circular in cross section, strongly annulate with close spaced, rounded, transverse ribs. The venter is bicarinate, with keels along either side separated by a flattened surface. The siphuncle is tubular and thin walled, and may be slightly ventral or dorsal of the center. The adult aperture has deep hyponomic and ocular sinuses, not too dissimilar from the Ordovician Lituites, to which this genus is possibly allied.

Some 12 species have been described which have been reduced to two, Ophioceras rudens Barrande, 1865 and O. simplex Barrande, 1865 with two subspecies, O. simplex simplex and O. s. proximum. Minor evolutionary changes can be observed within both species, which In spite of their widespread distribution do not demonstrate any major geographical variations.
