= Ctenobactrites =

Ctenobactrites Temporal range: Visean-Artinskian

Scientific classification
- Kingdom: Animalia
- Phylum: Mollusca
- Class: Cephalopoda
- Subclass: Nautiloidea?
- Order: †Mixosiphonata?
- Family: †Ctenobactritidae Shimansky, 1951
- Genus: †Ctenobactrites Shimansky, 1951

Type species
- †Ctenobactrites costatus Shimansky, 1951

Other species
- †Ctenobactrites isogramma (Meek, 1871); †Ctenobactrites obliquesulcatus (Gemmellaro, 1889); †Ctenobactrites mirus Shimansky, 1954; †Ctenobactrites inhonorus Shimansky, 1968; †Ctenobactrites lesliensis Mapes, 1979; †Ctenobactrites shindensis Shimansky, 1993

Synonyms
- Species synonymy: C. isogramma; Orthoceras isogramma Meek, 1871; Bactrites collinsi Miller & Unklesbay, 1947; Ctenobactrites collinsi (Miller & Unklesbay, 1947) C. obliquesulcatus; Orthoceras obliquesulcatum Gemmellaro, 1889

Extinct genus of cephalopods

Ctenobactrites is an extinct genus of cephalopods that lived from the Carboniferous to the Permian. It contains seven valid species which have been found in Europe, Asia, and North America. It was originally assigned to the order Bactritida, but has been proposed to be a potential member of the order Mixosiphonata.
