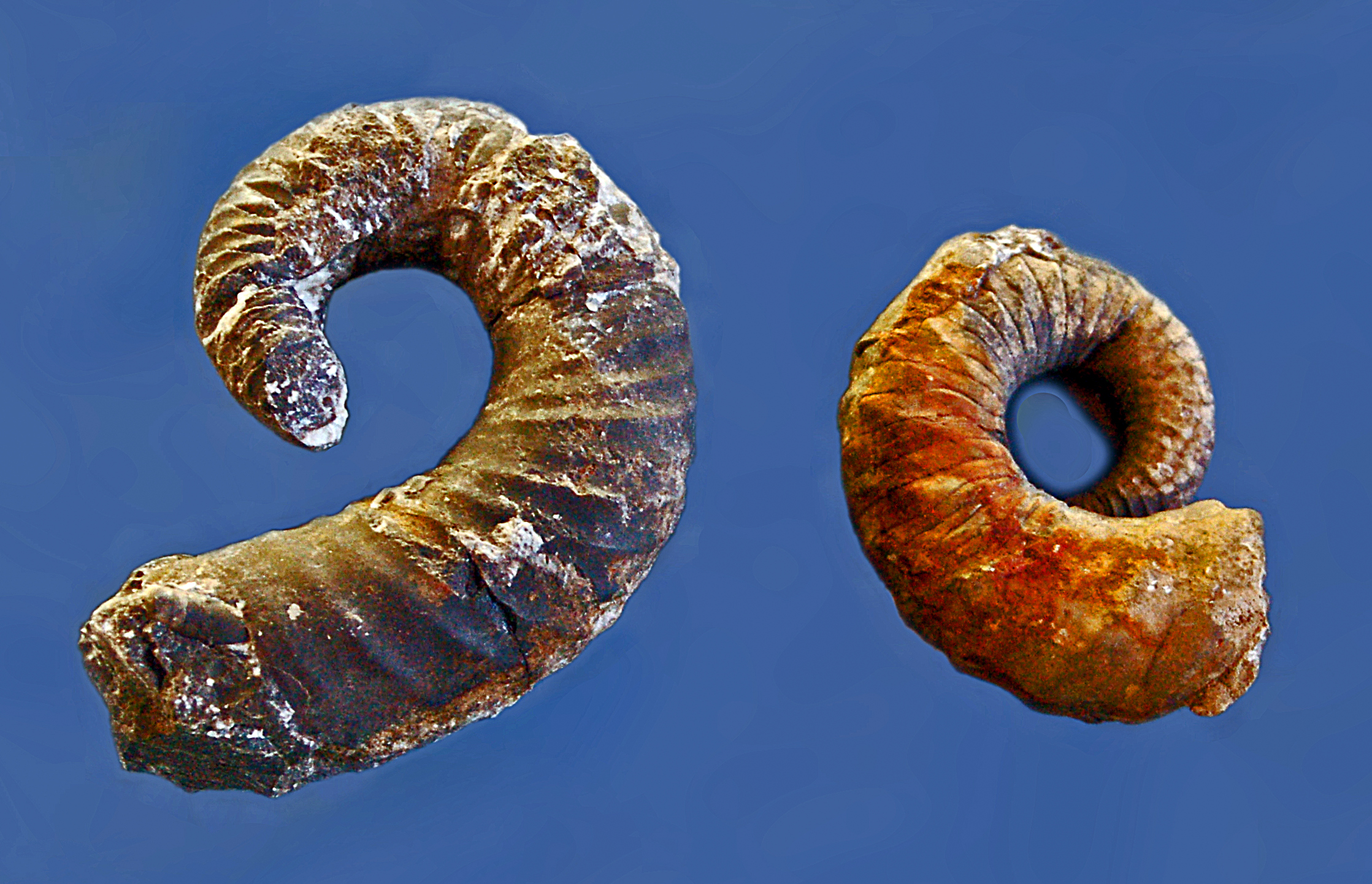
- Peismoceras optatum from Czech Republic, at the National Museum (Prague)

Scientific classification
- Domain: Eukaryota
- Kingdom: Animalia
- Phylum: Mollusca
- Class: Cephalopoda
- Subclass: Nautiloidea
- Order: †Tarphycerida
- Family: †Lechritrochoceratidae
- Genus: †Peismoceras; Hyatt, 1894

= Peismoceras =

Peismoceras Temporal range: Silurian

Genus of nautiloids

Peismoceras is a genus of fossil Cephalopoda in the family Lechritrochoceratidae.

These nautiloids were fast-moving nektobenthic carnivores. They lived in the Silurian Period, from Late Wenlock age (from 428.2 ± 1.5 to 422.9 ± 2.8 mya) to Přídolí Age (from 418.7 ± 1.5 to 416 ± 2.8 mya).

== Species ==
- Peismoceras amicum (Barrande)†
- Peismoceras optatum (Barrande)†
- Peismoceras pulchrum†
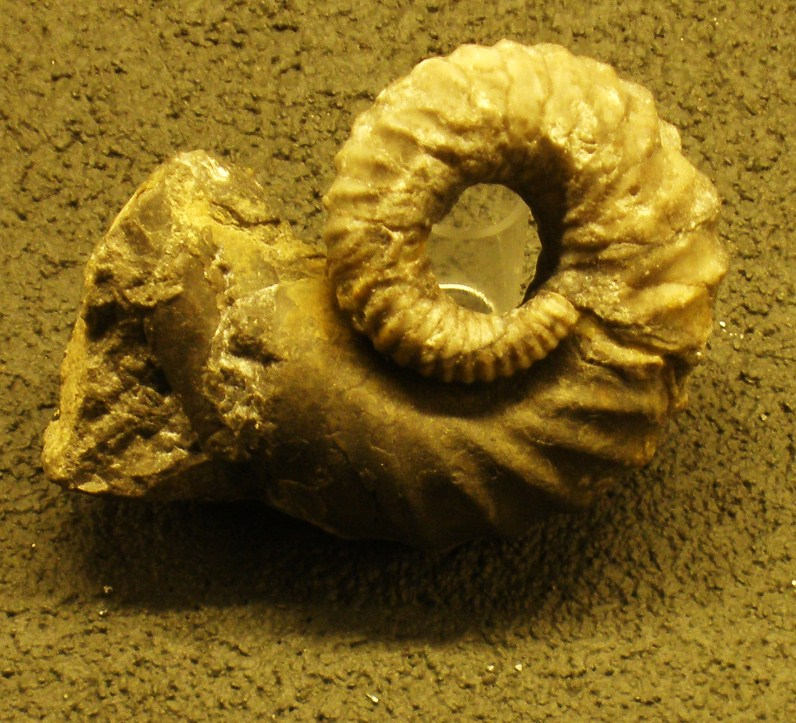
Fossil of Peismoceras, an extinct cephalopod at Teylers Museum, Haarlem
