= Uranoceratidae =

Uranoceratidae Temporal range: ?Late Ord - Mid Sil

Scientific classification
- Domain: Eukaryota
- Kingdom: Animalia
- Phylum: Mollusca
- Class: Cephalopoda
- Subclass: Nautiloidea
- Order: †Tarphycerida
- Suborder: †Barrandeocerina
- Family: †Uranoceratidae; Hyatt in Zittel, 1900

Genera
- See text

Extinct family of molluscs

The Uranoceratidae is a family of Silurian barrandeoceroids that tend to become uncoiled with age and in which siphuncle segments tend to be expanded into the camerae.

== Description ==
Shells of uranoceratids are gyroconic. Early stages of a few species are annulated. Later stages of all are smooth or faintly striated or cancellated. In many, septal necks are straight, but in others recumbent on one side or the other. Connecting rings are thin.

== Derivation and content ==
The Uranoceratidae are derived from Bickmorites. Genera include:

- Uranoceras
- Jolietoceras
- Cumingsoceras, and
- Cliftonoceras.
