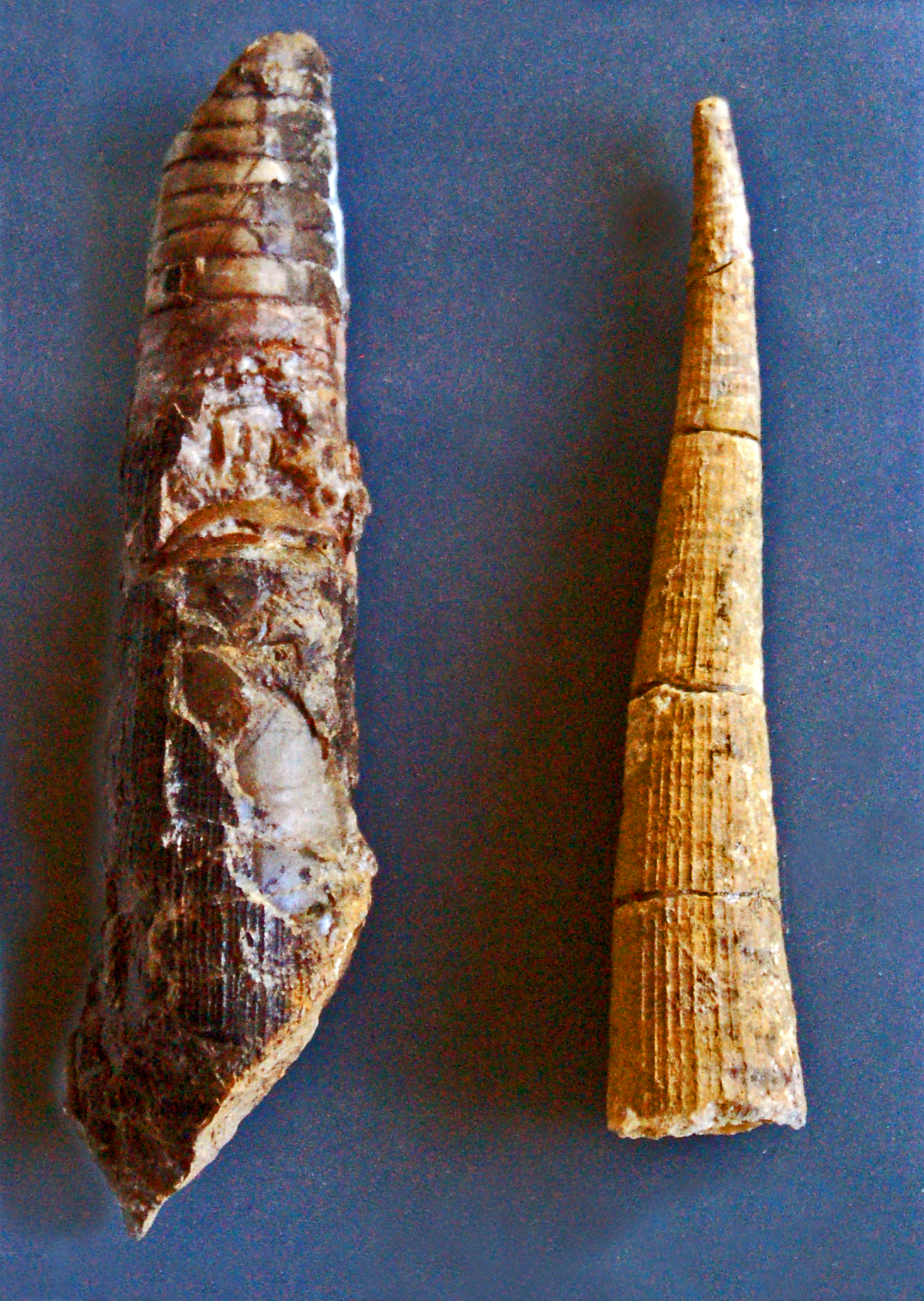
- Kionoceras doricum

Scientific classification
- Kingdom: Animalia
- Phylum: Mollusca
- Class: Cephalopoda
- Order: †Orthocerida
- Family: †Kionoceratidae; Hyatt (1900)

= Kionoceratidae =

Kionoceratidae Temporal range: Middle Ordovician–Lopingian

Family of nautiloids

Kionoceratidae is a family in the Orthocerida, proposed by Hyatt in 1900 for genera characterized by prominent ornamentation in the form of longitudinal ribs, ridges, or lirae, or combinations thereof, sometimes with similar transverse ornament or faint transverse annulations.

When Kionoceratidae was first conceived it contained only two genera, Kionoceras and Spyroceras. Spyroceras turns out to be a number of genera in different groupings. True Spyroceras is a Pseudorthoceratid from the Devonian. Middle Silurian genera related to Kionoceras studied by Barrande show a general internal similarity. Anterior siphuncle segments tend to become fusiform, some being constricted at the septal openings. Cameral deposits are confined apically and, where observed, siphonal deposits are simple annuli. While there seems to be a true relationship among the Silurian genera with similar external markings, the scope of Kionoceras itself is uncertain creating some doubt as to the establishment of a family based on such an uncertain genus. Flower sought to include Kionceras along with related genera in what he called the "already overcrowded Michelinoceratidae". Sweet (1964) in the Treatise presented kionoceratids as a subfamily, the Kionoceratinae, in the orthocerid family Michelinoceratidae. Kroger and Isakar (2006) cast some doubt as to the validity of this subgroup. which depends on whether it consists of convergent genera with different ancestries (polyphyletic) or is a true monophyletic group with a single ancestry. Regardless it is still a useful, descriptive, grouping within the Orthocerida.
