= Campbelloceras =

Campbelloceras Temporal range: Lower Ordovician

Scientific classification
- Domain: Eukaryota
- Kingdom: Animalia
- Phylum: Mollusca
- Class: Cephalopoda
- Subclass: Nautiloidea
- Order: †Tarphycerida
- Family: †Tarphyceratidae
- Genus: †Campbelloceras; Ulrich and Foerste, 1936

Genus of molluscs

Campbelloceras is a tarphyceratid nautiloid known from the Lower Ordovician, Upper Canadian Epoch of North America, where it is widespread. Campbelloceras was named by Ulrich and Foerste in 1936.

The shell of Campbelloceras has a circular whorl section, only slightly impressed, and a siphuncle that is close to the venter in all growth stages. Campbelloceras differs from Tarphyceras in that the rate of expansion is greater, the siphuncle is proportionally larger, and an impression is shallower.

Campbelloceras may have given rise to the barrandeocerid Plectoceras (Plectoceratidae) through simplification of the connecting rings, and to Tarphyceras through tighter coiling, development of a deeper impression, and reduction in the size of the siphuncle. Campbelloceras may be conceivably derived from Estonioceras (Estonioceratidae). The cross section of Campbelloceras and that of the outer whorl of Estonioceras are similar, except for Campbelloceras being slightly impressed. Both have proportionally large siphuncles, near the venter.
