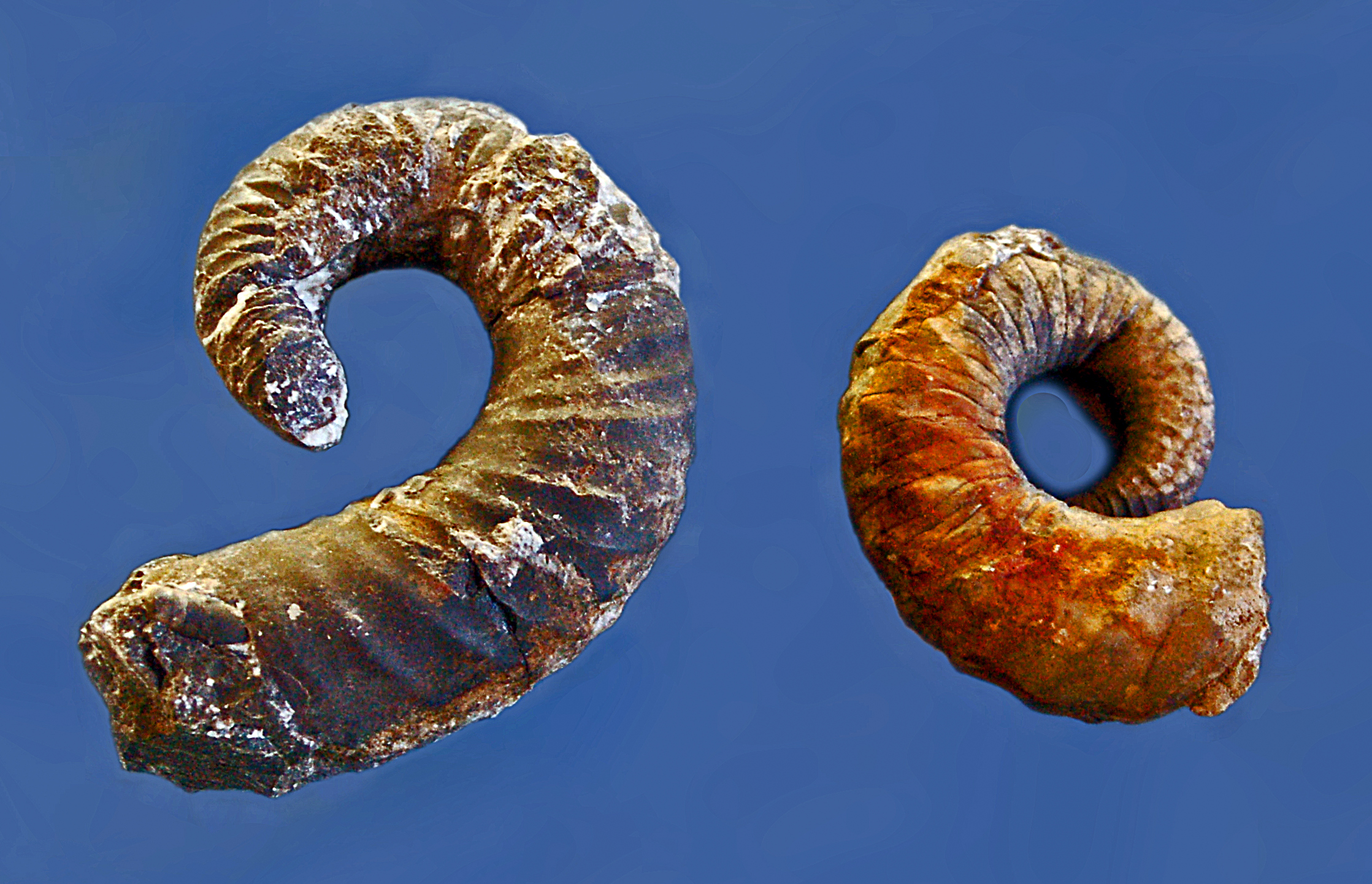
- Peismoceras optatum from Czech Republic, at the National Museum (Prague)

Scientific classification
- Kingdom: Animalia
- Phylum: Mollusca
- Class: Cephalopoda
- Subclass: Nautiloidea
- Order: †Tarphycerida
- Suborder: †Barrandeocerina
- Family: †Lechritrochoceratidae; Flower, 1950

Genera
- See text

= Lechritrochoceratidae =

Lechritrochoceratidae Temporal range: Mid-Late Silurian

Extinct family of nautiloids

Lechritrochoceratidae is a family of derived tarphycerids from the middle and upper Silurian, once included in the now largely abandoned Barrandeocerida.

== Description ==
Lechritrochoceratidae comprise dextrally torticonic genera with costate shells and ventrally displaced siphuncles. Offset coiling in low spired. Rate of expansion and coarseness of costae vary, genus to genus. Costae are generally narrow and sharp with wide areas between and slant dorso-ventrally toward the apex.

== Genera ==
Six genera have been described:

- Lechritrochoceras Foerste, 1926
- Catyrephoceras Foerste, 1926
- Leurotrochoceras Foerste, 1926
- Peismoceras Hyatt, 1894
- Systrophoceras Hyatt, 1894
- Trochodictyoceras Foerste, 1926
