= Gasconsoceras =

Gasconsoceras Temporal range: Middle Silurian

Scientific classification
- Kingdom: Animalia
- Phylum: Mollusca
- Class: Cephalopoda
- Subclass: Nautiloidea
- Order: †Tarphycerida
- Family: †Barrandeoceratidae
- Genus: †Gasconsoceras; Foerste, 1936

Extinct genus of molluscs

Gasconsoceras is a genus of nautiloid cephalopods belonging to the tarphyceroid family Barrandeoceratidae, known from Middle Silurian marine strata in Quebec.

Shells of Gasconsoceras are rapidly enlarging gyrocones and serpenticones covered by fine transverse and longitudinal striae and prominent dorsal and lateral transverse ribs. A fair degree of mobility is indicated by the deep hyponomic sinus. Other than being between center and venter, the siphuncle is poorly known.
