= Zhuravlevia =

Zhuravlevia Temporal range: Aptian

Scientific classification
- Kingdom: Animalia
- Phylum: Mollusca
- Class: Cephalopoda
- Subclass: Nautiloidea
- Order: †Mixosiphonata
- Genus: †Zhuravlevia; Doguzhaeva, 1994

Type species
- †Zhuravlevia insperata Doguzhaeva, 1994

Extinct genus of cephalopod

Zhuravlevia is an extinct genus of nautiloids that lived during the Early Cretaceous. It contains one valid species, Z. insperata. Its fossils have been found in the Caucasus region of Russia. It was the latest surviving orthoconic nautiloid, which otherwise went extinct in the Late Triassic. It was originally assigned to the order Orthocerida, but has since been reassigned to the order Mixosiphonata.
