= Savageoceras =

Savageoceras Temporal range: M Silurian

Scientific classification
- Kingdom: Animalia
- Phylum: Mollusca
- Class: Cephalopoda
- Subclass: Nautiloidea
- Order: †Tarphycerida
- Family: †Barrandeoceratidae
- Genus: †Savageoceras; Foeste, 1932

Extinct genus of molluscs

The genus Savageoceras is a barrandeoceratid first known from the Middle Silurian of Illinois consisting of rapidly enlarging, depressed cyrtocones with a trapezoidal section; ventral side wider and flatter than dorsal; sides converging on dorsum. Sutures have slight lateral and ventral lobes and ventrolateral saddles. The surface is covered by transverse striae and has rib-like rings that are more prominent at the ventrolateral shoulders but otherwise vaguely defined. The siphuncle is central; interior unknown.
