= Ophioceras =

Ophioceras is the scientific name of two genera of organisms and may refer to:

- Ophioceras (cephalopod), a genus of fossil nautiloids in the family Ophidioceratidae
- Ophioceras (fungus), a genus of fungi in the family Magnaporthaceae
