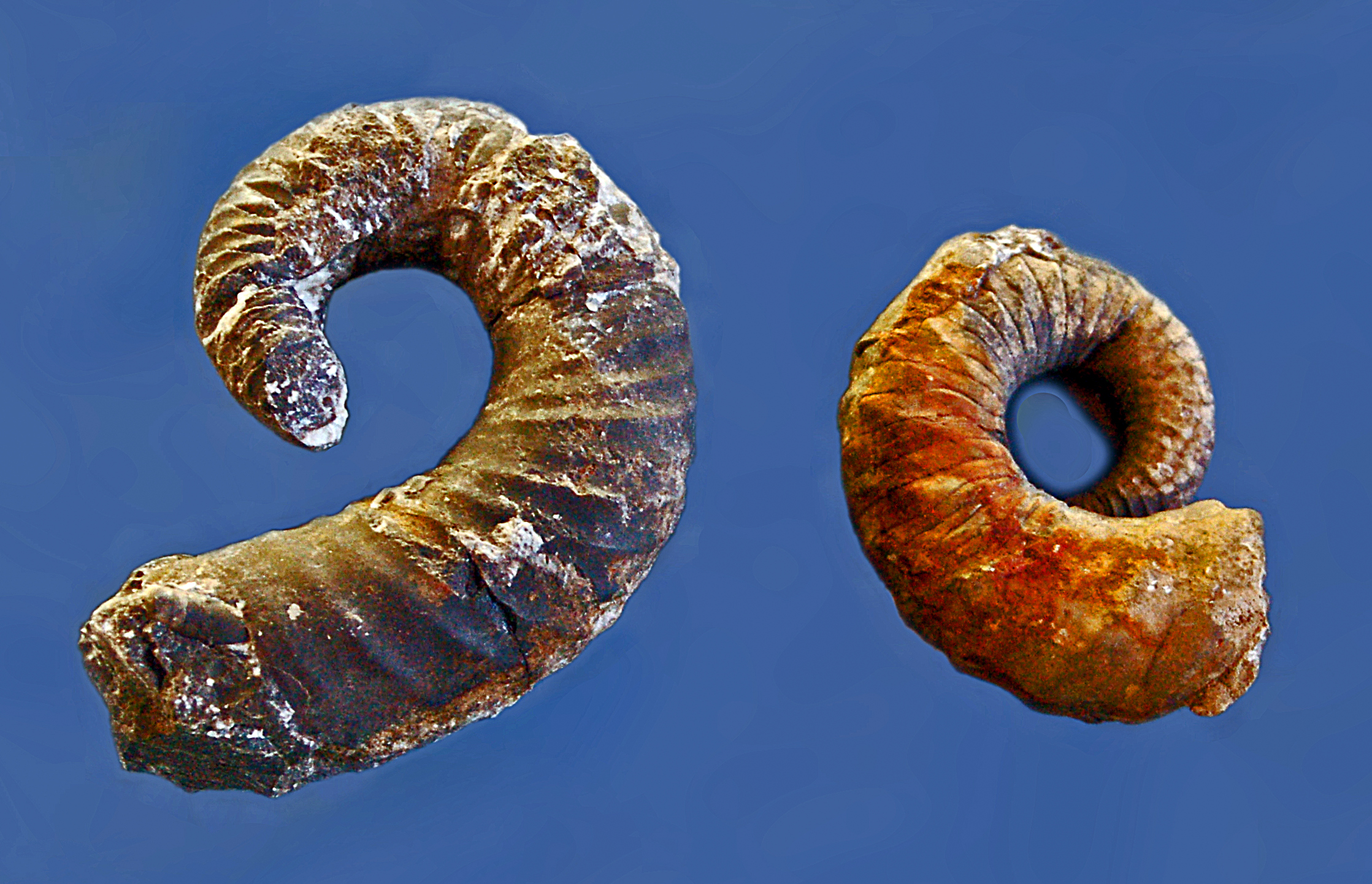
- Peismoceras optatum from Czech Republic, at the National Museum (Prague)

Scientific classification
- Kingdom: Animalia
- Phylum: Mollusca
- Class: Cephalopoda
- Subclass: Nautiloidea
- Order: †Tarphycerida
- Suborder: †Barrandeocerina; Flower, 1950

Families
- See text

= Barrandeocerina =

Barrandeocerina Temporal range: M Ordovician - M Devonian

Extinct suborder of molluscs

The Barrandeocerina comprise a suborder of Early Paleozoic nautiloid cephalopods, primitively coiled but later forms may be cyrtoconic, gyroconic, torticonic, and even breviconic, all having empty siphuncles with thin connecting rings. The Barrandeocerina were originally defined as a separate order by Rousseau Flower (Flower and Kummel, 1950), but since then have been united within the Tarphycerida as a suborder (Teichert 1988). Derivation is from the Tarphyceratidae.

In early forms the siphuncle is central or subcentral, orthochoanitic (septal necks short and straight), and thin, with tubular segments. Later forms include those with cyrtochoanitic septal necks (curved outward) and segments that may be slightly to strongly expanded into the chambers.

== Taxonomy ==
Six families are included in the Barrandeocerina, (ex Barrandeocerida).

Barrandeoceratidae M Ord-M Dev
Plectoceratidae M-U Ord
Apsidoceratidae M-U Ord
Uranoceratidae U Ord-M Sil
Lechritrochoceratidae M-U Sil
Nephriticeratidae L-M Dev

Flower also included the Lituitidae in the Barrandeocerida, (Flower and Kummel 1950), which were found (Sweet 1964) to have more in common with the Tarphycerida in the original Treatise Part K.
