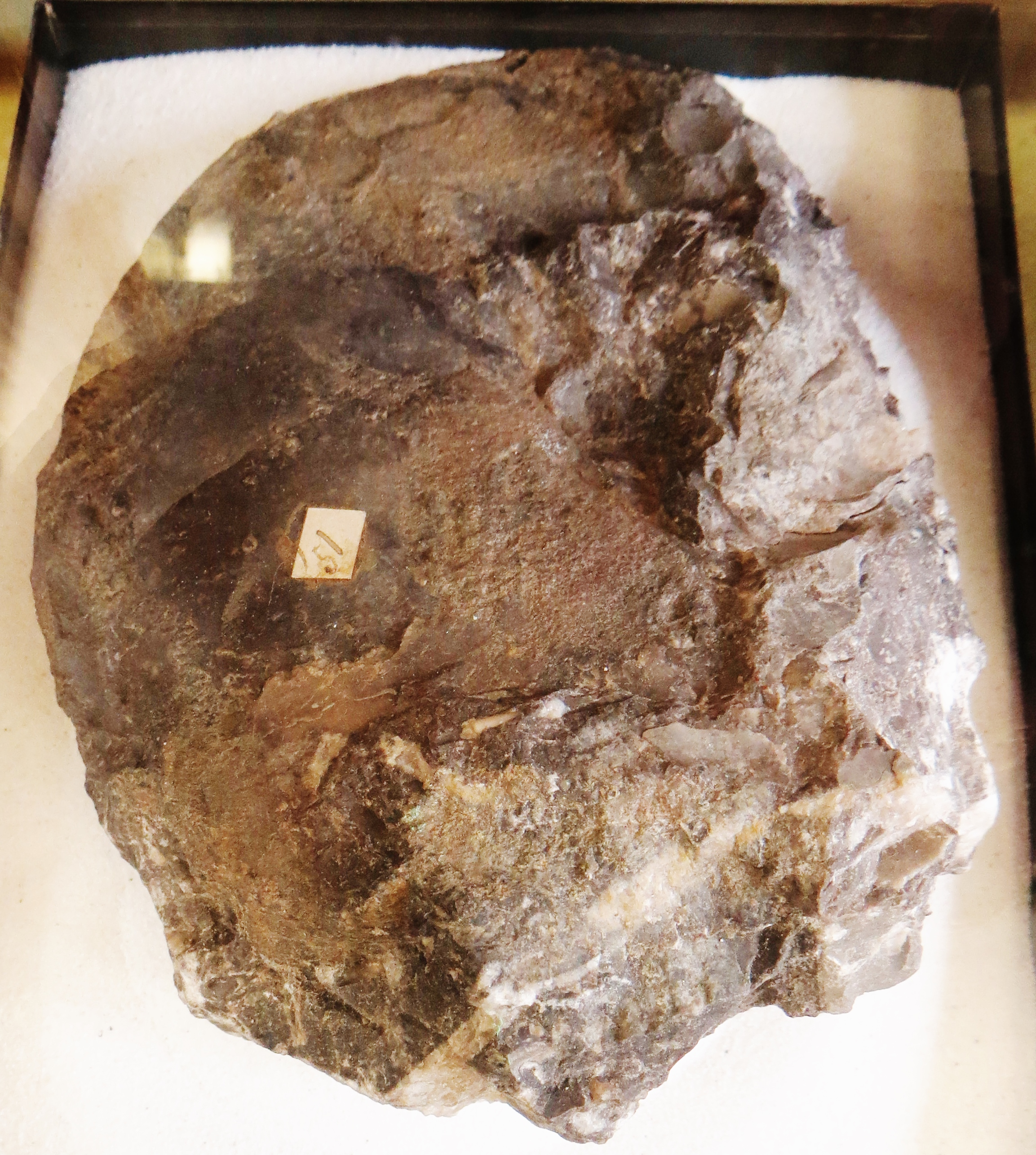
- B.bohemicum

Scientific classification
- Domain: Eukaryota
- Kingdom: Animalia
- Phylum: Mollusca
- Class: Cephalopoda
- Subclass: Nautiloidea
- Order: †Tarphycerida
- Family: †Barrandeoceratidae
- Genus: †Barrandeoceras; Hyatt, 1884

= Barrandeoceras =

Barrandeoceras Temporal range: Middle Ordovician

Genus of nautiloids

Barrandeoceras is a large, coiled, Middle Ordovician nautiloid cephalopod and part of the Tarphycerida. The shell is serpenticonic with whorls touching but not embracing. The adult body chamber becomes freed of the preceding whorl, a rather common character among tarphycerids. Whorl section is oval, somewhat more narrowly rounded ventrally, on the outer rim, than dorsally, on the inner rim. Prominent lateral ribs, at least on inner whorls. Grow lines show a distinct hyponomic sinus. Sutures have lateral lobes. The siphuncle is subcentral.

Barrandeoceras has been found in the Middle Ordovician of New York, Ontario, and Quebec. It is the type genus for the Barrandeoceratidae.
