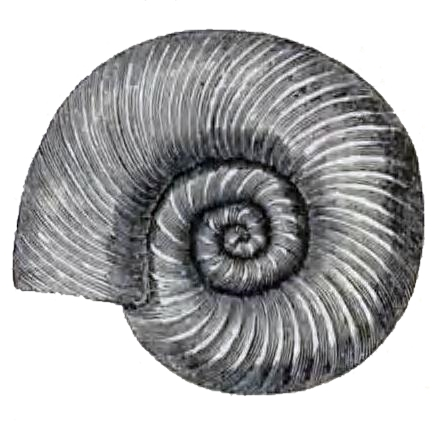

Scientific classification
- Domain: Eukaryota
- Kingdom: Animalia
- Phylum: Mollusca
- Class: Cephalopoda
- Subclass: Nautiloidea
- Order: †Tarphycerida
- Family: †Trocholitidae
- Genus: †Trocholites; Conrad, 1838

= Trocholites =

Trocholites Temporal range: Mid-Late Ordovician

Trocholites is a tarphycerid genus in the family Trocholitidae from the Middle and Late Ordovician with a gradually expanding, weakly ribbed shell; whorls in contact, dorsum slightly impressed; cross section depressed, venter and sides rounded; siphuncle close to but not at the dorsal margin.

The dorsal siphuncle of Trocholites, and the Trocholitidae is somewhat anomalous and may indicate something about the orientation of the shell during life; placing the last septum high rather than midway or low, typical of most. The prevailing location in most coiled cephalopods is central or ventral, extremely ventral in most ammonoids.

Trochoceras, of similar name, is a member of the Rutoceratidae in the Nautilida, and therefore only very distantly related back through the Bassleroceratidae.
