= Mixosiphonata =

Mixosiphonata Temporal range: Early Carboniferous - Early Cretaceous (Viséan - Aptian), 346.7–113.0 Ma

Scientific classification
- Kingdom: Animalia
- Phylum: Mollusca
- Class: Cephalopoda
- Subclass: Nautiloidea
- Order: †Mixosiphonata; Mutvei, 2017

Genera
- †Boggyoceras; †Ctenobactrites?; †Zhuravlevia

Extinct order of nautiloids

Mixosiphonata is an extinct order of nautiloids that lived from the Carboniferous to the Early Cretaceous. It currently includes the genera Boggyoceras, Zhuravlevia, and possibly Ctenobactrites. They were the latest surviving orthoconic nautiloids, which had otherwise gone extinct in the Late Triassic.
