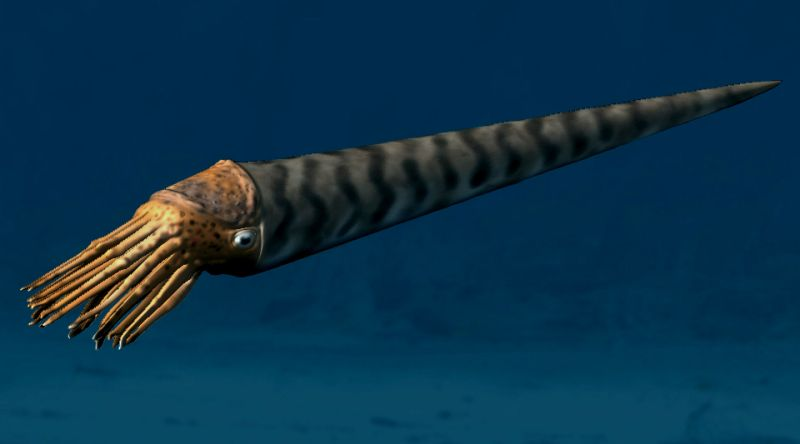
- Orthoceras

Scientific classification
- Kingdom: Animalia
- Phylum: Mollusca
- Class: Cephalopoda
- Order: †Orthocerida
- Family: †Paraphragmitidae; Flower, 1950

= Paraphragmitidae =

Paraphragmitidae Temporal range: Middle Silurian

Extinct family of molluscs

Paraphragmitidae is an extinct family of actively mobile aquatic carnivorous cephalopods belonging to the subclass Orthoceratoidea endemic to what would be Asia and Europe during the Silurian living from 436 to 418.7 mya, existing for approximately 17.3 million years.

In life, these animals may have been similar to the modern squid, except for the long shell. The internal structure of the shell consists of concavo-convex chambers linked by a centrally-placed tube called a siphuncle.

== Taxonomy ==
The Paraphragmitidae was named and defined by Flower (1950) as containing annulated orthocones and cyrtocones included in the Michelinoceratida. Walter Sweet, (in Teichert et al 1964), included them in the Orthocerataceae, one of two superfamilies then of the Orthocerida (=Michelinocerida) . With the recognition of the Pseudorthocerida as a separate order the two superfamilies became obsolete leaving the Paraphragmitidae simply an orthocerid family .
