= Tarphyceratidae =

Tarphyceratidae Temporal range: LOrdovician(Demingian-Cassinian)

Scientific classification
- Kingdom: Animalia
- Phylum: Mollusca
- Class: Cephalopoda
- Subclass: Nautiloidea
- Order: †Tarphycerida
- Family: †Tarphyceratidae; Hyatt (1894)

Extinct family of molluscs

The Tarphyceratidae are tightly coiled, evolute Tarphycerida with ventral siphuncles. The dorsum is characteristically impressed where the whorl presses against the venter of the previous. The Tarphyceratidae are derived from Bassleroceras or possibly from some member of the Estonioceratidae.

Tarphyceratids vary in form and siphuncle position. The siphuncle may be subcentral as in Centrotarphyceras; intermediary as in Tarphyceras, or subventral as in Campbelloceras. Cross sections vary. Tarphyceras and Campbelloceras are rounded. Centrotarphyceras is subquadrate with broadly rounded flanks and a slightly rounded venter. Eurystomites is subquadrate and slightly compressed, with the maximum width closer to the dorsum. Pionoceras is subrounded and slightly depressed with the maximum width closer to the venter. The dorsal impression in Tarphyceras and Eurystomites is broad and deep and in Pionoceras and Centrotarphyceras, broad and shallow. In Campbelloceras and Cycloplectoceras the impression is slight, running along the dorsal median.

The Tarphyceratidae are known mainly from the Lower Ordovician (M-U Canad); gave rise to the Trocholitidae and provided the sources for the more advanced barrandeocerids

== Genera ==
Genera in the Tarphyeratidae as named in the Treatise on Invertebrate Paleontology Part K (Furnish and Glenister 1964) are restricted to the middle and upper parts of the Lower Ordovician in North America. For purposes of discussion only, they are divided into those where dorsum, which is on the inside or concave side of the volutions, is more deeply impressed and those with dorsum that is only moderately or slightly impressed. (Fig 262, K359, Furnish and Glenister, 1964)

Tarphyceratidae with dorsum deeply impressed

- Tarphyceras: Serpenticonic, whorls rounded vantrally and laterally, deeply impressed dorsally; rate of expansion moderate; siphuncle ventral to subcentral. Found widespread.
- Centrotarphyceras: Whorl section generally subquadrate, typically with flattened venter and flanks. Expanded more gradually than Tarphyceras. Mature siphuncle subcenral. Widespread
- Eurystomites: Large, whorls subquadrate, may be higher than wide, broadly rounded ventrally and laterally with discernible ventrolateral shoulders, dorsally impressed; siphuncle large, subcentral Widespread.
- Pionoceras : Whorl section suboval with broadly rounded venter and flanks that converge on the more narrow and impressed dorsum. Siphuncle fairly large, submarginal. Widespread

Tarphycerida with dorsum slightly to moderately impressed

- Campbelloceras: Whorl section circular, slightly impressed; siphuncle close to the venter in all growth stages. Expanded more rapidly than Tarphyceras, siphuncle proportionally larger. Widespread.
- Cycloplectoceras: Like Campbelloceras but with pronounced ribs. Found in Arkansas.
- Moreauoceras: Like campbelloceras but more gradually expanded and with subterminal mature aperture. Found in Missouri
- Pilotoceras: Small, whorls subtapezoidal to subtriangular in section; venter narrow, sides flattened and divergent, dorsum with small shallow impression; siphuncle narrow, subcentral. Widespread.

Uncertain

- Seelyoceras: Depressed, strongly annulate (transversely ribbed), curved nautiloid with ventral marginal siphuncle based on a single fragments. Affinities uncertain. Found in New York (state).
