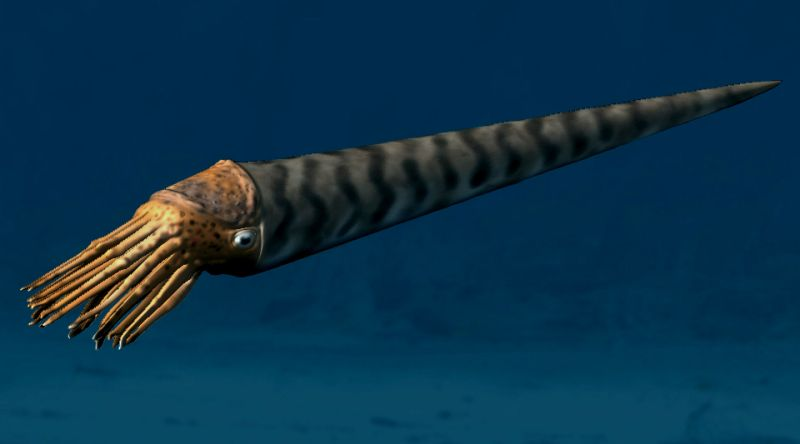
- Orthoceras

Scientific classification
- Kingdom: Animalia
- Phylum: Mollusca
- Class: Cephalopoda
- Subclass: †Orthoceratoidea
- Order: †Orthocerida; Kuhn, 1940

Families
- Arionoceratidae; Baltoceratidae; Clinoceratidae; Engorthoceratidae; Geisonoceratidae; Lamellorthoceratidae; Orthoceratidae; Proteoceratidae; Stereoplasmoceratidae; Paraphragmitidae; Sphooceratidae

= Orthocerida =

Orthocerida Temporal range: Early Ordovician to Late Permian Possible Late Triassic records and possible taxa descendant living up to the Early Eocene

Extinct order of molluscs

Orthocerida, from Ancient Greek ὀρθός (orthós), meaning "straight", and κέρας (kéras), meaning "horn", also known as the Michelinocerida, is an order of extinct orthoceratoid cephalopods that lived from the Early Ordovician to the Late Permian. While there has been some possible Late Triassic records for the order, although they have been reclassified as pseudorthocerids. The Eocene fossil Antarcticeras is sometimes considered a descendant of the orthocerids although this is disputed. They were most common however from the Ordovician to the Devonian.

A fossil found in the Caucasus was previously assigned to Orthocerida, extending the range to the Early Cretaceous, but has since been reassigned to the order Mixosiphonata.

== Shell form ==
The shell is usually long, and may be straight ("orthoconic") or gently curved. In life, these animals may have been similar to the modern squid, except for their long shell. The internal structure of the shell consists of concavo-convex chambers linked by a centrally-placed tube called a siphuncle. There is a tendency for the chambers to develop cameral deposits, which were used as ballast to balance the long gas-filled shell. Depending on the family, the siphuncle has orthochoanitic (short and straight) or cyrtochoanitic (outwardly curved) septal necks, which protrude from the septa. The shell surface may be (depending on the species or genus) smooth, transversely ribbed, or ornamented by a network of fine lirae. Fossils are common and have been found on many continents, including the Americas, Africa, Europe, and Asia.

== Ecology ==
Orthocerids may have swum near the sea bed with their buoyant shell resting horizontally in the water, floated more passively among plankton, or rested on the sea floor. Like modern cephalopods they would have used jet-propulsion for locomotion. Their long, bulky shell and relatively weak muscle attachments however make it unlikely that they were as agile as ammonoids or modern cephalopods. They most likely fed on trilobites and small arthropods.

== Taxonomy ==
Orthocerid taxonomy is based primarily on morphological characters found in the shell, principally in the nature of the siphuncle. Parsing these relationships out however can become complicated due to similar characteristics through convergent evolution, making certain taxa appear to have a much longer stratigraphic range than in actuality.

Well preserved embryonic shells of the family Pseudorthoceratidae from the Mississippian (Lower Carboniferous) Imo Formation of Arkansas revealed significant diversity in the shells' morphology, as well as indicating that Pseudorthoceratidae may be in need of revision.

== Evolutionary history ==
Orthocerids likely arose from the Baltoceratidae, a family of the Ellesmerocerida. However, the phylogeny of Orthocerida is heavily debated as it lacks clearly defined characters. Some important characteristics include the diameter and thickness of a calciosiphonate connecting ring and shape of orthocone siphuncles. Orthocerida may thus be a polyphyletic group, having arisen as several lineages from early Ordovician cephalopods. Some workers have split off the Pseudorthocerida and Dissidocerida as separate orders, the latter on the grounds that it arose from a different baltoceratid ancestor. The pseudorthocerids are thought to be distinct because their protoconch and septal necks significantly different than orthocerids.

Orthocerids flourished in the Paleozoic Era, giving rise to multiple orders, most notably ascocerids. The spherical protoconch, or first chamber, of some orthocerids suggests they were ancestors to the Bactritida, small orthoconic forms that gave rise to both the ammonoids and coleoids. Fossilized radulas from orthocerids also suggest a closer affinity with modern coleoids than with Nautilus.

There is some dispute as to when the orthocerids became extinct. Although they are said to have survived into the Triassic Period, the two genera that date from that period may actually be pseudorthocerids, which may suggest that orthocerids went extinct during the Permian. A potential Cenozoic descendant of orthocerids is known in Antarcticeras, an enigmatic cephalopod from the Eocene of Antarctica with an internal shell akin to that of coleoids but with an anatomy closely resembling that of orthocerids, suggesting that it may represent an orthocerid offshoot that diverged as its own subclass during the Paleozoic and survived up to the Eocene, convergently evolving a coleoid-esque internal shell. However, other studies recover it as a primitive oegopsid squid.
