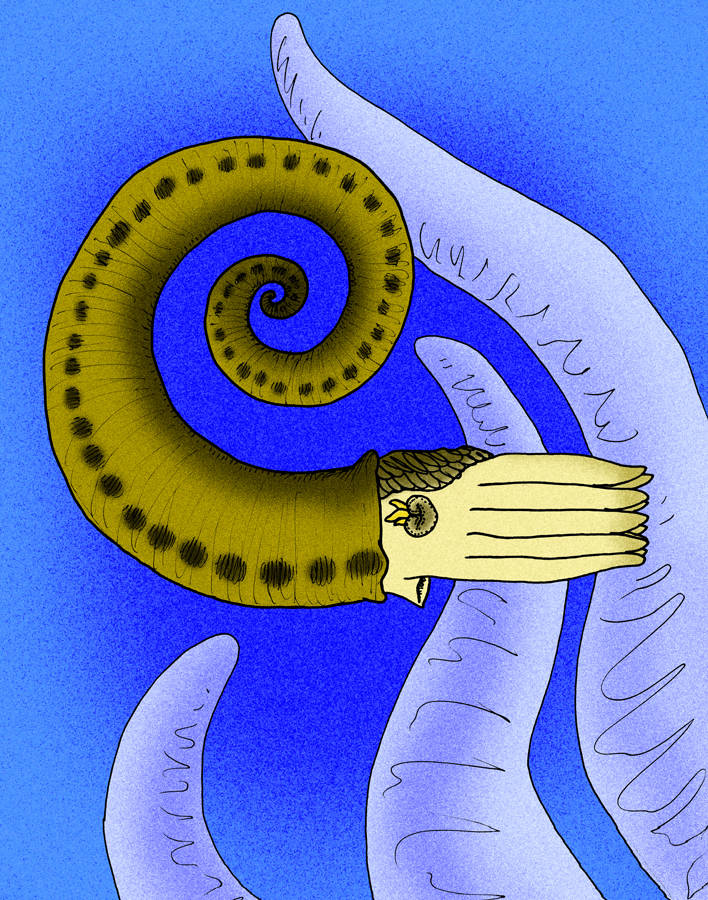
- A reconstruction of Aphetoceras americanum
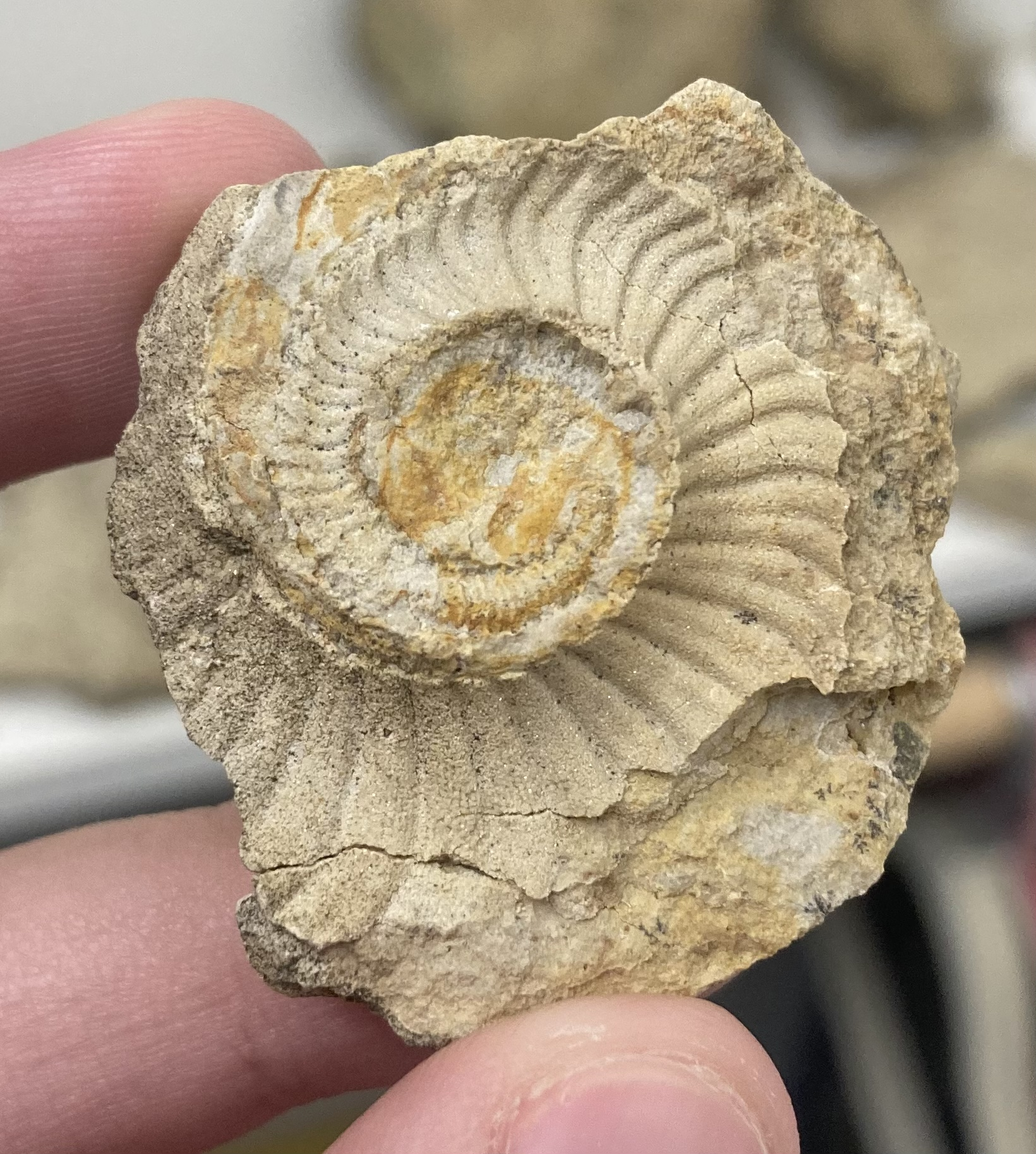
- A Trocholites imprint from Mount Horeb, Wisconsin

Scientific classification
- Domain: Eukaryota
- Kingdom: Animalia
- Phylum: Mollusca
- Class: Cephalopoda
- Subclass: Nautiloidea
- Order: †Tarphycerida; Flower, 1950

= Tarphycerida =

Tarphycerida Temporal range: Lower Ordovician–Devonian

Extinct order of molluscs

The Tarphycerida were the first of the coiled cephalopods, found in marine sediments from the Lower Ordovician (middle and upper Canad) to the Middle Devonian. Some, such as Aphetoceras and Estonioceras, are loosely coiled and gyroconic; others, such as Campbelloceras, Tarphyceras, and Trocholites, are tightly coiled, but evolute with all whorls showing. The body chamber of tarphycerids is typically long and tubular, as much as half the length of the containing whorl in most, greater than in the Silurian Ophidioceratidae. The Tarphycerida evolved from the elongated, compressed, exogastric Bassleroceratidae, probably Bassleroceras, around the end of the Gasconadian through forms like Aphetoceras. Close coiling developed rather quickly, and both gyroconic and evolute forms are found in the early middle Canadian.

Tarphycerids tend to uncoil in the late mature stage of their growth, indicating they settled into a benthic lifestyle as they became older. Younger, wholly coiled forms were probably more active, nektobenthic, certainly more maneuverable.

== Composition and taxonomy ==
The Tarphycerida comprise three phylogenetically related groups of families. They are: the tarphyceratid group consisting of the Estonioceratidae, Tarphyceratidae, Trocholitidae, and Ophidioceratidae; the barradeoceratid group, derived from Centrotarphyceras, consisting of the Barrandeoceratidae, Bickmoritidae, Nephriticeratidae, and Uranoceratidae; and the plectoceratid group, derived from Campbelloceras, consisting of the Plectoceratidae, Lechritrochoceratidae, and Apsidoceratidae.

The tarphyceratids comprise the Tarphycerida of the Treatise on Invertebrate Paleontology Part K to which Flower added the ancestral Bassleroceratidae. The Estonioceratidae, Tarphyceratidae, and Trocholitidae are primitive forms characterized by siphuncles with thick-walled connecting rings. The Ophidioceratidae are derived offshoots.

The barrandeoceratid and plectoceratid families were once combined in the Barrandeocerida, determined to be invalid due to having multiple ancestors in the Tarphyceriatidae and therefore abandoned. The common characteristic of these forms is the thin-walled connecting rings in their siphuncles.

A 1988 classification divides the Tarphycerida into suborders Tarphycerina and Barrandeocerina, which were previously defined as separate orders.

== Broader relationships ==
Tarphycerids are more closely related to the diverse Oncocerida, through the ancestral Bassleroceratidae in the Lower Ordovician, than to the other nautiloid orders. The Oncocerida, in turn, gave rise to the Nautilida which include the recent Nautilus and Allonautilus. This puts the Tarphycerida in the broad group that includes the nautilids. It makes them also separate from the groups that include the Discosorida, Actinocerida, Endocerida, and Orthocerida, and from the superficially similar Ammonoidea.

== Tarphycerid biology ==
The tarphycerid animal must have been rather elongated, like squid, although no close relationship is implied. Either that or it was able to retreat deep into its portable lair. As for whatever arms or tentacles they may have had, no indication has been found. They probably went through two stages, first a younger more active and swimming stage with simple coiled shells, followed by a less active, bottom-dwelling stage with shells that diverge during which they mated and produced, probably a single litter of young, like the modern but unrelated coleoids.
