= Evolution of cephalopods =

Origin and diversification of cephalopods through geologic time

The cephalopods have a long geological history, with the first nautiloids found in late Cambrian strata.

The class developed during the middle Cambrian, and underwent pulses of diversification during the Ordovician period to become diverse and dominant in the Paleozoic and Mesozoic seas. Small shelly fossils such as Tommotia were once interpreted as early cephalopods, but today these tiny fossils are recognized as sclerites of larger animals, and the earliest accepted cephalopods date to the Middle Cambrian Period. During the Cambrian, cephalopods are most common in shallow near-shore environments, but they have been found in deeper waters too. Cephalopods were thought to have "undoubtedly" arisen from within the tryblidiid monoplacophoran clade. However genetic studies suggest that they are more basal, forming a sister group to the Scaphopoda but otherwise basal to all other major mollusc classes. The internal phylogeny of Mollusca, however, is wide open to interpretation – see mollusc phylogeny.

== Traditional views of origin ==
The cephalopods were once thought to have evolved from a monoplacophoran-like ancestor with a curved, tapering shell, and to be closely related to the gastropods (snails). The similarity of the early shelled cephalopod Plectronoceras to some gastropods was used to support this view. The development of a siphuncle would have allowed the shells of these early forms to become gas-filled (thus buoyant) in order to support them and keep the shells upright while the animal crawled along the floor, and separated the true cephalopods from putative ancestors such as Knightoconus, which lacked a siphuncle. Negative buoyancy (i.e. the ability to float) would have come later, followed by swimming in the Plectronocerida and eventually jet propulsion in more derived cephalopods. However, because chambered shells are found in a range of molluscs – monoplacophorans and gastropods as well as cephalopods – a siphuncle is essential to ally a fossil shell conclusively to the cephalopoda. Chambered gastropods can be distinguished from cephalopod shells by the absence of a siphuncle, the irregular spacing of septa, the layering of the shell and (in younger or unmetamorphosed rocks) its microstructure, and the relatively thick width of the shell. The earliest such shells do not have the muscle scars which would be expected if they truly had a monoplacophoran affinity.

== Early shell record ==
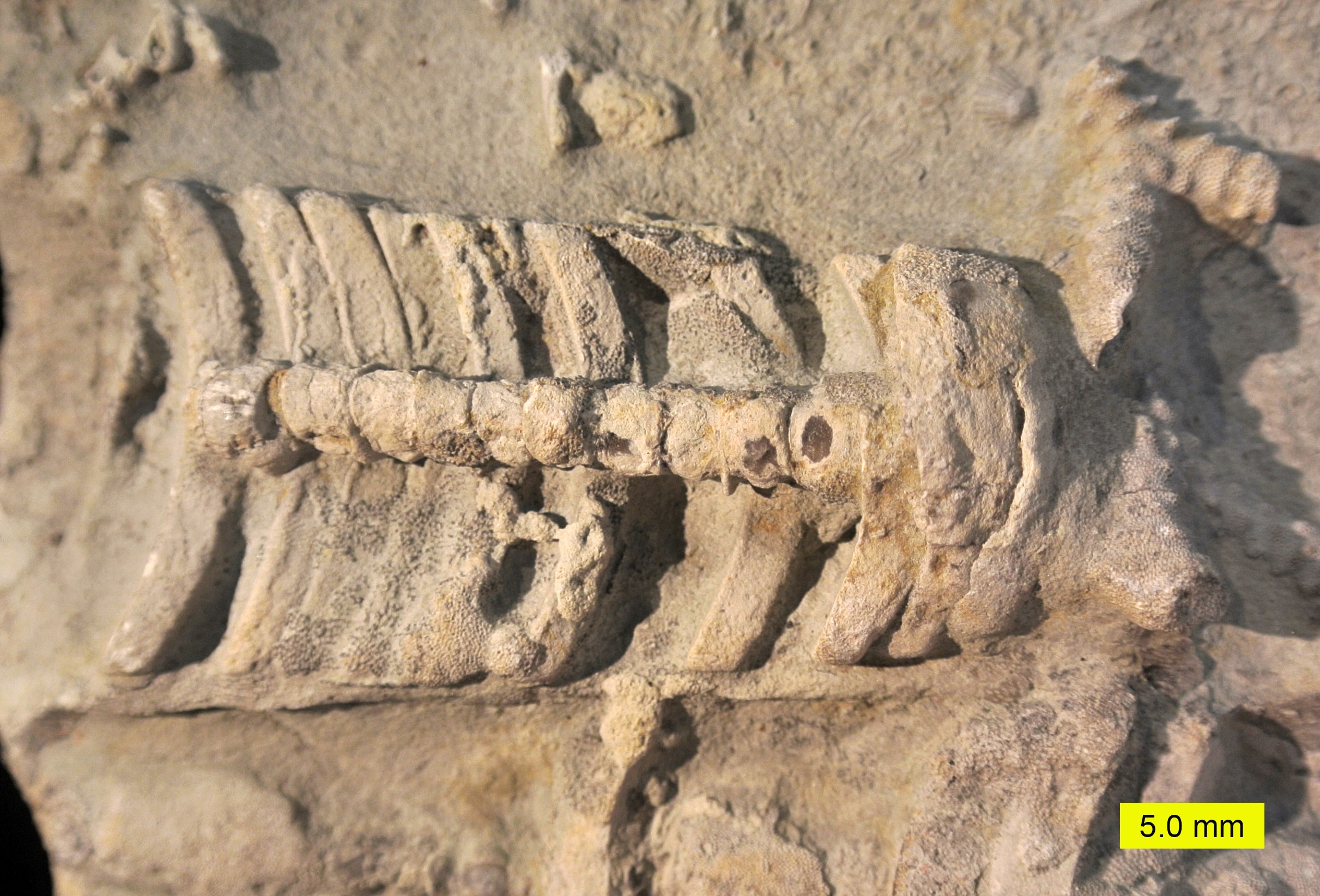
Fossil orthoconic nautiloid from the Ordovician of Kentucky; an internal mold showing siphuncle and half-filled camerae, both encrusted.

Understanding of early cephalopod origins is by necessity biased by the available fossil material, which on the whole consists of shelly fossils. Critical fossils are detailed below; since their stratigraphic age has guided the interpretation of the fossils, they are listed in descending order of age.

=== Cambrian ===
With the exception of the shelly genera Ectenolites and Eoclarkoceras, none of the 30+ Cambrian cephalopod genera are known to have survived into the Ordovician. Cambrian cephalopods differ from their descendants by account of their small size (a few centimetres in length); long, tapering shells; smooth shell surfaces; closely spaced septa; and lack of deposits in their body chamber; several more specific features are also only seen in certain groups of Cambrian cephalopod.

==== Tannuella ====
Tannuella is the oldest fossil to have been assigned to the cephalopods, dating from the Early Cambrian (Atdababian and Botomian), ~522 million years ago. Its position in this group is suggested based on its shape and the presence of chambers. Under this hypothesis, it would be a precursor to the hypseloconids and then genera such as Knightoconus that eventually gave rise to the cephalopods.

==== Knightoconus ====
Knightoconus is a Late Cambrian monoplacophoran thought to represent an ancestor to the cephalopods. It had a chambered, conical shell, but lacked a siphuncle. Although earlier molluscan fossils are also septate, Knightoconus is the latest septate mollusc before the first siphunculate cephalopods – a point that has been taken to prove its relevance to the Cephalopoda. The absence of this siphuncle has been taken as evidence against cephalopod ancestry – how, it is argued, could a siphuncle evolve to penetrate existing septa? The prevailing argument suggests that a strand of tissue remained attached to the previous septum as the mollusc moved forwards and deposited its next septum, producing an obstacle to the complete closure of the septum and becoming mineralised itself. 10 or more septa are found in mature individuals, occupying around a third of the shell – septa form very early and have been found in specimens as small as 2 mm in length. Septa are uniformly spaced, which is inconsistent with a gastropod affinity. Unlike monoplacophoran fossils, there is no evidence of muscle scarring in Knightoconus fossils.

==== Plectronoceras ====
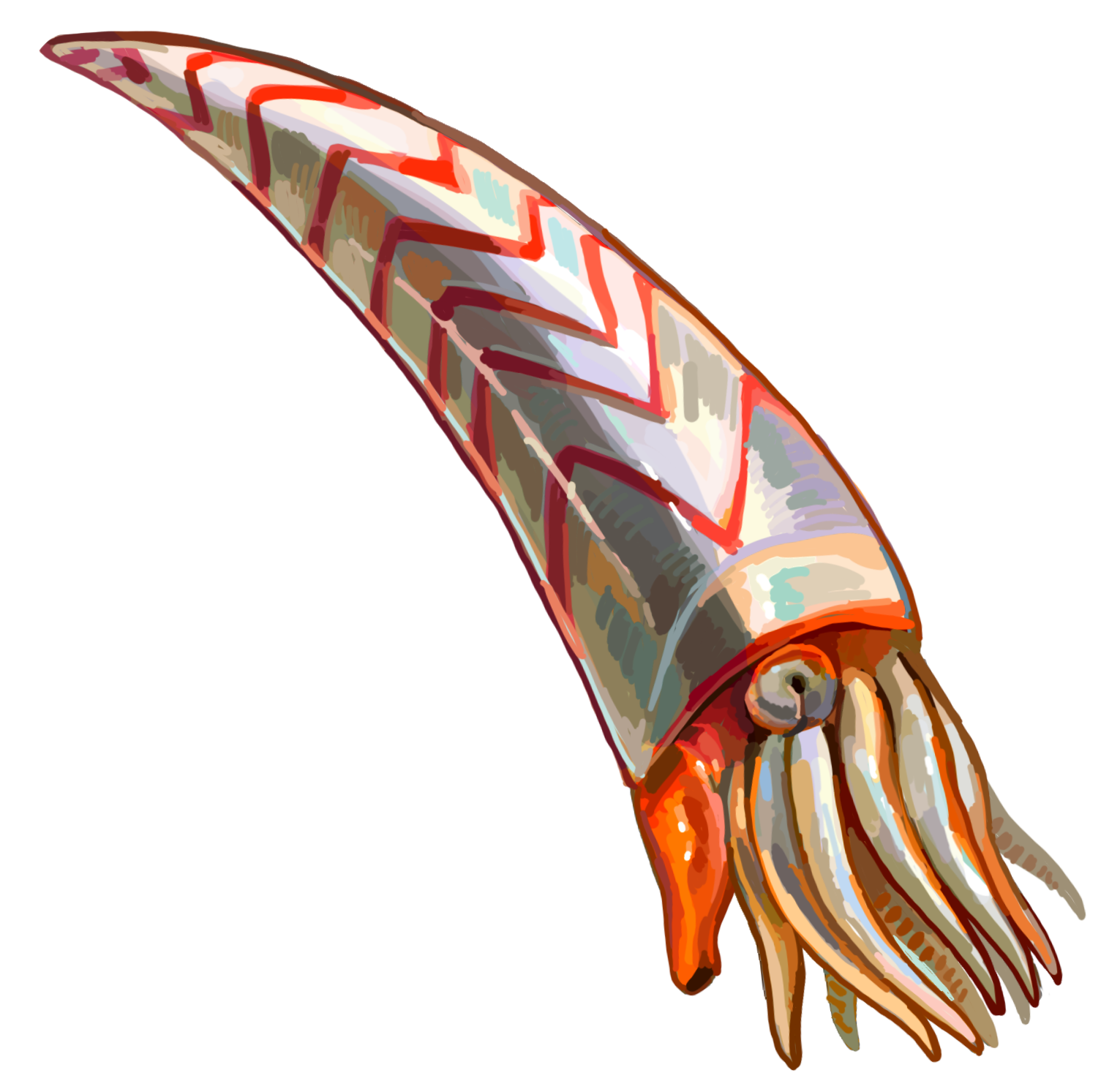
Reconstruction of Plectronoceras

Plectronoceras is arguably the earliest known crown-group cephalopod, dating to the Upper Cambrian. Its 14 known specimens hail from the basal Fengshan Formation (north-east China) of the earliest Fengshanian stage. None of the fossils are complete, and none show the tip or opening of the shell. Approximately half of its shell was filled with septa; 7 were recorded in a 2 cm shell. Its shell contains transverse septa separated by about half a millimetre, with a siphuncle on its concave side. Its morphology matches closely to that hypothesised for the last common ancestor of all cephalopods, and the Plectronocerida have been said to be the ancestors of the Ellesmerocerids, the first "true cephalopods".

==== Yochelcionellids ====
The Yochelcionellids have given rise to the "snorkel hypothesis". These fossils are aseptate helcionellids with a snorkel-like tube on one surface. The snorkel has been seized upon as characteristic of a cephalopod-like water circulatory system, or perhaps as a precursor to the siphuncle. However, neither of these theories have been borne out.

==== Ellesmerocerida ====
Sketch of the soft-part anatomy of early ellesmeroceridans, as reconstructed by Kröger (2007).

The earliest true cephalopod order to emerge was the Ellesmerocerida, which were quite small; their shells were slightly curved, and the internal chambers were closely spaced. The siphuncle penetrated the septa with meniscus-like holes. This marks an important difference from the earlier cephalopods, whose siphuncle was at the edge of the septum and against the shell wall. On the basis of muscle scars preserved in such genera as Paradakeoceras and Levisoceras, these animals are reconstructed with a straight body and dorsal shell, with the head at the anterior, concave surface of the shell, and the funnel (consisting of a pair of folds in the foot at the rear), not juxtaposed with the head as in later, oncocerid-like forms.

=== Early Ordovician diversity ===
The Ellesmerocerids were the only shelled cephalopods known to have survived the end-Cambrian extinction; all subsequent cephalopods are thus thought to be derived from these forms, which diversified throughout the Ordovician period.

Early cephalopods had fine shells that could not cope with the pressures of deep water. In the mid Tremadoc, these were supplemented by larger shells around 20 cm in length; these larger forms included straight and coiled shells, and fall into the orders Endocerida (with wide siphuncles) and Tarphycerida (with narrow siphuncles).

By the mid Ordovician these orders are joined by the Orthocerids, whose first chambers are small and spherical, and Lituitids, whose siphuncles are thin. The Oncocerids also appear during this time; they are restricted to shallow water and have short exogastric conchs. The mid Ordovician saw the first cephalopods with septa strong enough to cope with the pressures associated with deeper water, and could inhabit depths greater than 100–200 m. The wide-siphuncled Actinocerida and the Discocerida both emerged during the Darriwilian. The direction of coiling would prove to be crucial to the future success of the lineages; endogastric (Note: Endogastric means the shell is curved so as the ventral or lower side is longitudinally concave (belly in); exogastric means the shell is curved so as the ventral side is longitudinally convex (belly out). Exogastric coiling allows the funnel to be pointed backwards, beneath the shell.) coiling would only permit large size to be attained with a straight shell, whereas exogastric coiling – initially rather rare – permitted the spirals familiar from the fossil record to develop, with their corresponding large size and diversity.

Curved shells brought a number of benefits. Firstly, minerals are not required in as large quantities, as each successive whorl builds on the one before. Also, the organism is more stable (its centre of mass coincides with its centre of buoyancy) and more manoeuvrable.

Early cephalopods were likely predators, near the top of the food chain. In the Early Palaeozoic, their range was far more restricted than today: They were mainly constrained to sub-littoral regions of shallow shelves of the low latitudes, and usually occur in association with thrombolites. They gradually adopted a more pelagic habit as the Ordovician progressed. Deep-water cephalopods, whilst rare, have been found in the Lower Ordovician – but only in high-latitude waters.

=== Fossils mistaken for cephalopods ===
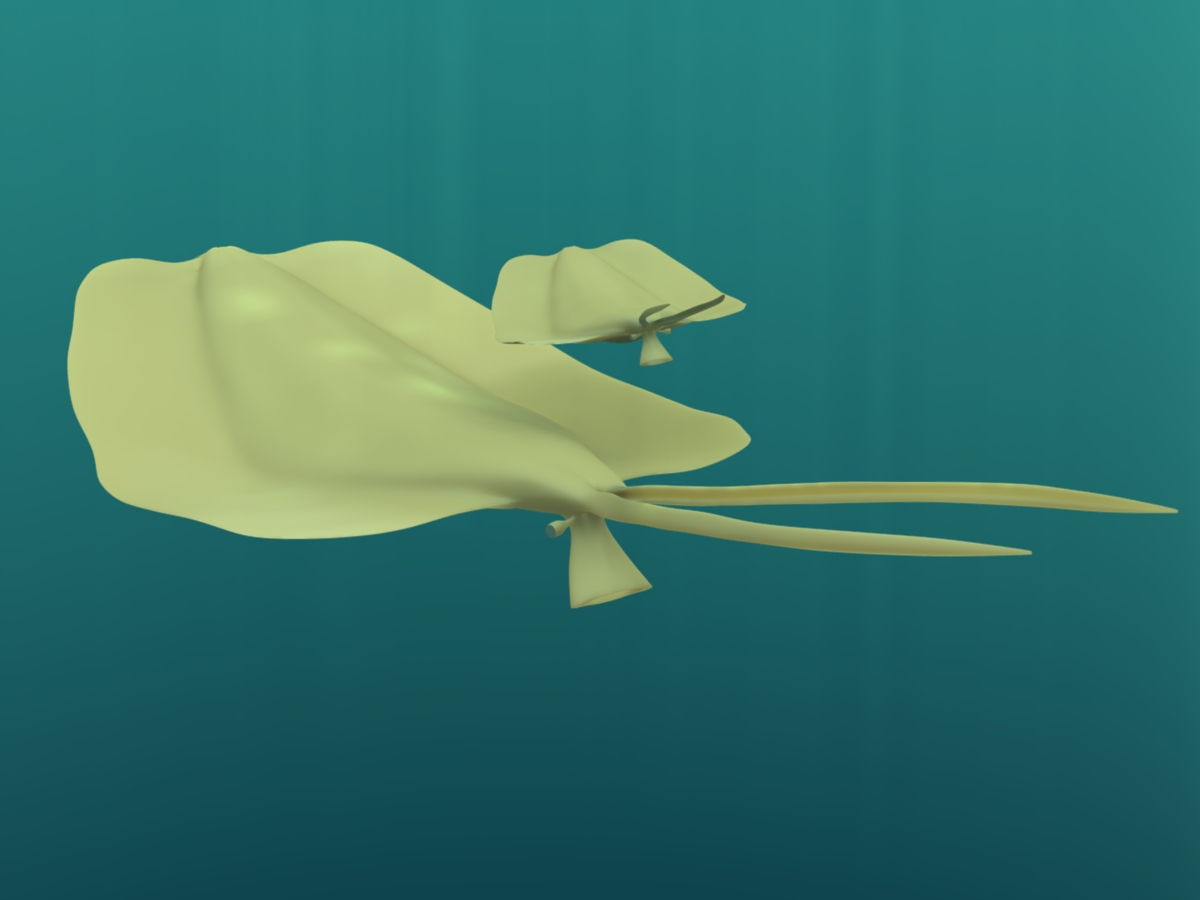
Reconstruction of Nectocaris, enigmatic animal that is misidentified as stem-cephalopod

A number of fossils have historically been considered to represent components of the cephalopods' history, but been reinterpreted on the basis of additional material.

==== Nectocaris ====
Nectocaris pteryx was previously described from poorly preserved specimen and considered as an arthropod. In 2010, Martin Smith and Jean-Bernard described specimens of Nectocaris and they considered that animal as early form of cephalopod. Unlike other early cephalopods, it did not have a shell and appeared to possess jet propulsion in the manner of "derived" cephalopods, complicated the question of the order in which cephalopod features developed. Due to the fact that its morphology is strongly dissimilar to confirmed early cephalopods, their affinities to cephalopods and even to molluscs more broadly are rejected by most authors. A 2025 study, definitively found nectocaridids to be relatives of modern chaetognaths (arrow worms).

==== NFM F-2774 ====
This specimen from Early Cambrian was originally proposed as the earliest cephalopod shell. However, later study found that specimen is actually a chimera fossil.

==== Volborthella ====
When it was discovered in 1888, it was thought that the early Cambrian Volborthella was a cephalopod. However discoveries of more detailed fossils showed that Volborthella's small, conical shell was not secreted but built from grains of the mineral silicon dioxide (silica); neither was it septate. This illusion was a result of the laminated texture of the organisms' tests. Therefore, Volborthella's classification is now uncertain.

==== Shelbyoceras ====
Because the characters differentiating monoplacophora from cephalopods are few, several monoplacophora have been mistaken for cephalopod ancestors. One such genus is Shelbyoceras, which was reclassified based on a depressed groove that forms a band around the shell, which is similar to a feature seen in Hypseloconus. The septa in this genus are either closely or irregularly spaced.

==== Kirengellids ====
The Kirengellids are a group of shells that, whilst originally aligned to the monoplacophoran ancestry of the cephalopods, have been reinterpreted as brachiopods.

==== Hyoliths ====
Hyoliths such as Allatheca have been interpreted as cephalopod ancestors, but hyoliths proper are now recognized as brachiopods.

== Coleoidea ==
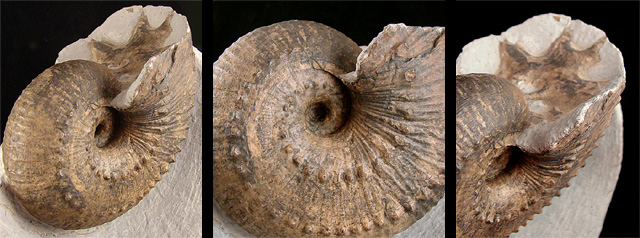
An ammonitic ammonoid with the body chamber missing, showing the septal surface (especially at right) with its undulating lobes and saddles.

The ancestors of coleoids (including most modern cephalopods) and the ancestors of the modern nautilus, had diverged by the Floian Age of the Early Ordovician Period, over 470 million years ago. We know this because the orthocerids were the first known representatives of the neocephalopoda, were ultimately the ancestors of ammonoids and coleoids, and had appeared by the Floian. It is widely held that the Bactritida, a Silurian–Triassic group of orthocones, are paraphyletic to the coleoids and ammonoids – that is, the latter groups arose from within the Bactritida. An increase in the diversity of the coleoids and ammonoids is observed around the start of the Devonian period, and corresponds with a profound increase in fish diversity. This could represent the origin of the two derived groups.

Unlike most modern cephalopods, most ancient varieties had protective shells. These shells at first were conical but later developed into curved nautiloid shapes seen in modern nautilus species. It is thought that competitive pressure from fish forced the shelled forms into deeper water, which provided an evolutionary pressure towards shell loss and gave rise to the modern coleoids, a change which led to greater metabolic costs associated with the loss of buoyancy, but which allowed them to recolonise shallow waters. The loss of the shell may also have resulted from evolutionary pressure to increase manoeuvrability, resulting in a more fish-like habit. This pressure may have increased as a result of the increased complexity of fish in the late Palaeozoic, increasing the competitive pressure. Internal shells still exist in many non-shelled living cephalopod groups but most truly shelled cephalopods, such as the ammonites, became extinct at the end of the Cretaceous.

=== Early fossils ===
The Early Devonian Naefiteuthis has been interpreted as the earliest fossil coleoid, and its shell may be in a partly internalized state. Belemnoids proper appear slightly later in the Early Devonian, and represent the first unambiguous coleoids.

The Mazon Creek biota contains a decapod, Saundersites (originally called as Jeletzkya), which had ten arms, but the status of its shell is ambiguous as it has not been extracted from the concretion that preserves the only fossil. Accordingly, it has been interpreted as both an internal and an external shell; the specimen may represent a 'squid' or a belemnoid, although due to preservation its affinities are not known well. Another notable fossil from Mazon Creek is Paleocadmus (previously called as Pohlsepia), which has originally been interpreted as an oldest cirrate octopus, but later reinterpreted as rare record of soft tissue of nautiloid.

The Late Mississippian Bear Gulch Limestone contains some important genera of early coleoids. Gordoniconus has large internal conch which looks similar to external shell that can be seen in bactritid, and this genus probably shows how external shell become into internal conch. Syllipsimopodi is considered as belonging to Octopodiformes which contains modern octopuses and vampire squids, although it is later considered to be synonymous with Gordonioconus.

== Organ origins ==
The arms of the ancestral cephalopod developed from the mollusc's foot; the ancestral state is thought to have had five pairs of arms which surrounded the mouth. Smell-detecting organs evolved very early in the cephalopod lineage.

The earliest cephalopods, (Note: Ordovician orthocone nautiloids are the first for which trace fossil evidence is available.) like Nautilus and some coeloids, appeared to be able to propel themselves forwards by directing their jet backwards. Because they had an external shell, they would not have been able to generate their jets by contracting their mantle, so must have used alternate methods, such as by contracting their funnels or moving the head in and out of the chamber.

== Exceptional preservation ==
The preservation of cephalopod soft parts is not entirely unusual; soft-bodied fossils, especially of coeloids (squid), are relatively widespread in the Jurassic, but phosphatized remains are unknown before this period. On the other hand, soft parts – including a possible ink sac – are known from the Paleozoic Hunsrück Slate and Francis Creek shale. Putative cephalopod egg fossils have also been documented.
