= Albertoceras =

Albertoceras Temporal range: Earliest Ordovician

Scientific classification
- Kingdom: Animalia
- Phylum: Mollusca
- Class: Cephalopoda
- Subclass: Nautiloidea
- Order: †Ellesmerocerida
- Family: †Ellesmeroceratidae
- Genus: †Albertoceras; Ulrich & Foerste, 1935

Extinct genus of molluscs

Albertoceras is a genus of Early Ordovician ellesmeroceratids with a small, slender, orthoconic to slightly endogastric shell; some even tiny. The cross section is strongly compressed so as to make the height proportionally notably greater than the width. The sutures, marking the edges of the septa, have broad, shallow, lateral lobes. The siphuncle, which seems to lack diaphragms, lies close to the venter.

Albertoceras differs from Ectenolites, which it closely resembles in the early, or juvenile, portion, in having a short living chamber that narrows toward the aperture and a convex dorsal profile in the adult portion. The ventral profile remains straight throughout.

Albertoceras walcotti, the type species, and A. gracillimum are both from the Mons Formation of Alberta. A. staufferi is from the Tanyard Formation of Texas and A. clelandi is from the Tribes Hill Limestone of New York.
