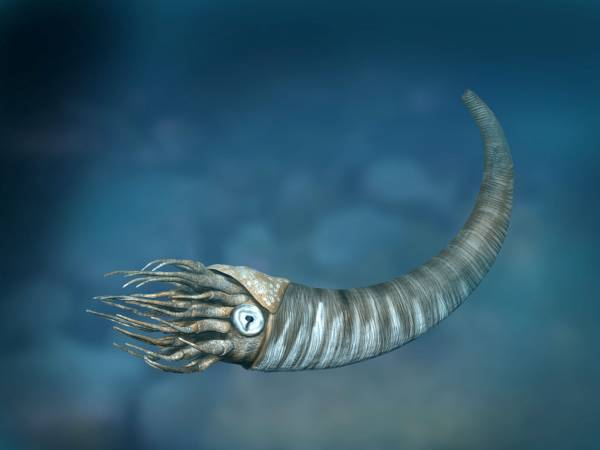
- Cyrtoceras, a member of the order Oncocerida

Scientific classification
- Domain: Eukaryota
- Kingdom: Animalia
- Phylum: Mollusca
- Class: Cephalopoda
- Subclass: Nautiloidea
- Superorder: †Multiceratoidea; Mutvei, 2013

Orders
- Ellesmerocerida (in part); Cyrtocerinida; Tarphycerida; Oncocerida (paraphyletic); Ascocerida; Discosorida

= Multiceratoidea =

Multiceratoidea Temporal range: Stage 10–Lower Carboniferous Possible descendant taxon Nautilida survives to present

Extinct subclass of cephalopods

Multiceratoidea is a major subclass or superorder of Paleozoic nautiloid cephalopods. Members of this group can be characterized by nautilosiphonate connecting rings, with an organic inner layer and outer layer of calcitic spherules and blades, similar to the modern nautilus. The earliest-diverging multiceratoids have oncomyarian muscle scars (with numerous small muscle attachments ringing the body chamber), though several orders trend towards a ventromyarian condition (with muscle scar area concentrated at the bottom of the body chamber). Multiceratoid shells are generally short and curled, with a relatively small aperture (opening). Cameral deposits are never found among the multiceratoids, though several orders are known to bear endosiphuncular deposits within their siphuncles.

When originally defined in 2013, Multiceratoidea included four nautiloid orders: Ellesmerocerida, Oncocerida, Discosorida, and Ascocerida. The order Tarphycerida was considered a potential member of the subclass, though their larger body chamber and specialized muscle attachments lent uncertainty to this idea. A later analysis added the early-diverging order Cyrtocerinida, which was previously considered a suborder of Ellesmerocerida. Nautilida (the order containing the modern nautilus) was allied with multiceratoids in a broader group termed "Nautilosiphonata", defined by its namesake connecting ring structure.

Solely on the basis of morphological traits, Tarphycerida and Nautilida appear to be well-nested within Multiceratoidea. Multiceratoidea would be an equivalent term to Nautiloidea sensu stricto if nautilids are confirmed to be within the group, though molecular divergence timing disagrees with this assessment. The recently named order Bisonocerida shares traits with ellesmerocerids and endocerids, and some studies have placed it as a member of Multiceratoidea.

A 2022 bayesian phylogenetic analysis supports the existence of Multiceratoidea as a valid monophyletic clade (discounting the question of nautilus origins), with a membership that includes Tarphycerida and excludes most ellesmerocerids. This is because Ellesmerocerida is a paraphyletic group, an assemblage of early nautiloids ancestral to various later groups, more than just Multiceratoidea. The order Oncocerida was found to be paraphyletic and ancestral to ascocerids and discosorids, though it was an unambiguous member of Multiceratoidea regardless. Bisonocerids were excluded from Multiceratoidea and instead allied with Endocerida, similar to older perspectives on their relationships.
