= Dakeoceras =

Dakeoceras Temporal range: L Ordovician

Scientific classification
- Kingdom: Animalia
- Phylum: Mollusca
- Class: Cephalopoda
- Subclass: Nautiloidea
- Order: †Ellesmerocerida
- Family: †Ellesmeroceratidae
- Genus: †Dakeoceras; Ulrich & Furnish, 1931

Genus of molluscs

Dakeoceras is a genus of simple cyrtoconic ellesmeroceratid cephalopods in the fossil record. All known species come from the Lower Canadian epoch (Gasconadian) of North America.

The Dakeoceras shell is an endogastric cyrtocone with the siphuncle on the concave, ventral, side; moderately curved and expanded in the juvenile stages which become reduced in the adult.

Forms in which the cross section is broadened, with the venter becoming flattened, are separated as Paradakeoceras. Quebecoceras is also similar but for its circular cross section and more persistent rate of expansion and curvature. Levisoceras is more compressed, more strongly curved, and has a higher rate of expansion especially in the vertical plane.
