= Burenoceras =

Burenoceras Temporal range: L Ordovician

Scientific classification
- Kingdom: Animalia
- Phylum: Mollusca
- Class: Cephalopoda
- Subclass: Nautiloidea
- Order: †Ellesmerocerida
- Family: †Ellesmeroceratidae
- Genus: †Burenoceras; Ulrich & Foeste, 1931

Genus of molluscs

Burenoceras is a genus of small, even tiny, Gasconadian cyrtoconic ellesmeroceratids in which the phragmocone—the chambered portion—is shorter that the living chamber.

In general form, Burenoceras is similar to Levisoceras, but much smaller. Two species, B. phragmoceroides and B. percompressum with contracted, slit-like apertures, are miniature forms resembling the much larger homeomorphic Silurian discosorid Phragmoceras and Devonian oncocerid Bolloceras. Other Burenoceras have apertures that are variable straight sided or flaring.

Burenoceras is among what are referred to as microellesmeroceroids.
