= Eremoceras =

Eremoceras Temporal range: Lower Ordovician

Scientific classification
- Kingdom: Animalia
- Phylum: Mollusca
- Class: Cephalopoda
- Subclass: Nautiloidea
- Order: †Ellesmerocerida
- Family: †Ellesmeroceratidae
- Genus: †Eremoceras; Hyatt,1884

Species
- see text

Extinct genus of molluscs

Eremoceras is a genus in the Ellesmeroceratidae which lived during the Early Ordovician, characterized by an orthoconic adult stage, similar to Ellesmeroceras, but with the dorsal side of the adult living chamber somewhat convex, and a juvenile portion that is more gradually expanding and ventrally concave. The siphuncle is ventral, partitioned by diaphragms as typical for the family. Siphuncle segments have short septal necks and thick connecting rings.
