= Acaroceratidae =

Acaroceratidae Temporal range: Late Cambrian

Scientific classification
- Domain: Eukaryota
- Kingdom: Animalia
- Phylum: Mollusca
- Class: Cephalopoda
- Subclass: Nautiloidea
- Order: †Ellesmerocerida
- Family: †Acaroceratidae; Chen et al, 1979

Genera
- See text

Extinct family of molluscs

Acaroceratidae is family of Upper Cambrian (Trempealeauan) nautiloid cephalopods included in the Ellesmerocerida that contains two known genera, Acaroceras and Weishanuceras, both found in northern China.

Acaroceratidae represent some of the earliest Ellesmeroderida, which have their origin in the Plectronoceratidae, either in Plectronoceras or some related genus. Acaroceras is known from the lower and middle Trempealeauan, upper Yenchou and overlying Wanwankou members of the Fengshan Formation. Weishanuceras is so far limited to the Wanwankou.

The Acaroceratidae are characterized by small, slightly expanded, laterally compressed shells with a slight downward,(endogastric), curvature. Siphuncles are tubular, located along the ventral margin; composed of straight segments.

In general conformation Acaroceras and Weishanuceras are rather similar, but differ in the details of the siphuncle. Acaroceras, the earlier of the two, has a siphuncle composed of short straight septal necks and thin straight connecting rings, and is empty of internal calcareous deposits. Rather thin, slightly concave diaphragms are present in the early, adapical, portion. Weishanuceras, which came later, also has short straight septal necks, but connecting rings are moderately thick as well as straight, and the siphuncle contains internal, ring-like deposits.

Neither of the Acaroceratidae appears to have left any descendants. Early Acaroceras, from the upper Yenchou, are contemporary with later Plectronoceras, early Paraplectronoceras, Hunyuanoceras, and a few others. Later Acaroceras and Weishanuceras are part of the entire suite of early cephalopods that lived during the Late Cambrian. Acaroceras lends its name to the Acaroceras-Sinoceremoceras Zone which is contained by the Wanwankou member of the Fengshan Formation.
