= Cyrtocerinida =

Cyrtocerinida Temporal range: Ordovician

Scientific classification
- Kingdom: Animalia
- Phylum: Mollusca
- Class: Cephalopoda
- Subclass: Nautiloidea
- Superorder: †Multiceratoidea
- Order: †Cyrtocerinida; Flower, 1964

Subgroups
- Cyrtocerinidae; Eothinoceratidae; Bathmoceras; Rummoceras

Extinct order of nautiloids

Cyrtocerinida is an order of Ordovician nautiloid cephalopods. The order includes the families Cyrtocerinidae and Eothinoceratidae, as well as the genera Bathmoceras and Rummoceras.

Cyrtocerinids can be characterized by a broad siphuncle encased by very thick connecting rings with concave outer surfaces. Despite their thickness, the connecting rings are nautilosiphonate, meaning that their inner layer is a poorly-mineralized organic sheath (similar to modern nautiluses) rather than a porous calcified structure. There are various calcified endosiphuncular deposits such as collars and longitudinal ridges on the inner layer of the connecting ring. These deposits are discontinuous, reforming after each chamber. This differentiates them from the continuous endosiphuncular ridges found in other nautiloids, such as the related oncocerids. The overall shell shape is typically orthoconic (straight, pointed) or breviconic (stout). The body chamber is oncomyarian, meaning that it is ringed by numerous small, undifferentiated muscle scars.

Cyrtocerinida was previously known under the name Cyrtocerinina, which was considered a suborder of the order Ellesmerocerida. Current studies generally consider Cyrtocerinida to be the earliest-branching monophyletic clade within the subclass (or superorder) Multiceratoidea. This is justified by the combination of oncomyarian muscle scars, nautilosiphonate connecting rings, and endosiphuncular deposits.
