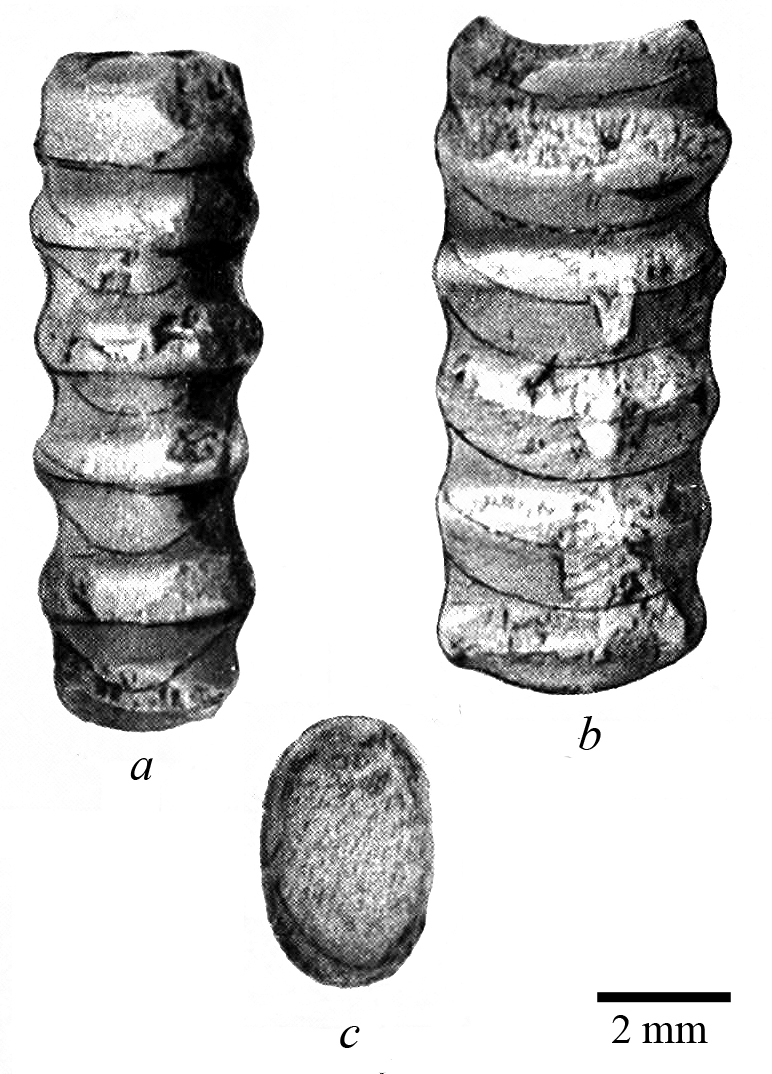
- Walcottoceras monsense

Scientific classification
- Domain: Eukaryota
- Kingdom: Animalia
- Phylum: Mollusca
- Class: Cephalopoda
- Subclass: Nautiloidea
- Order: †Ellesmerocerida
- Family: †Protocycloceratidae
- Genus: †Walcottoceras; Ulrich & Foerste 1936

= Walcottoceras =

Walcottoceras Temporal range: Early Ordovician

Extinct genus of molluscs

Walcottoceras is a genus of cephalopods from the Lower Ordovician included in the ellesmerocerid family Protocycloceratidae according to Rousseau Flower in 1964.

The shell of Walcottoceras is small, slender, compressed, with prominent annuli (complete encircling ribs or costae); may be straight or slightly endogastric. Could be said to be an annulate Ectenolites.

Walcottoceras has been found in the Lower Ordovician of British Columbia, Alberta, Utah, and New York.
