= Plectronoceratoidea =

Plectronoceratoidea Temporal range: Upper Cambrian–Ordovician

Scientific classification
- Domain: Eukaryota
- Kingdom: Animalia
- Phylum: Mollusca
- Class: Cephalopoda
- Subclass: Nautiloidea
- Superorder: †Plectronoceratoidea; Wade, 1988

Orders
- †Plectronocerida; †Yanhecerida; †Protactinocerida; †Ellesmerocerida (paraphyletic)

Extinct superorder of nautiloids

Plectronoceratoidea is a superorder or subclass containing primitive nautiloids from the Late Cambrian and Early Ordovician. This group is best considered a paraphyletic grade of early cephalopods, as it contains the ancestors of subsequent post-Cambrian cephalopod orders.

Plectronoceratoidea contains several exclusively Cambrian cephalopod orders: Plectronocerida, Protactinocerida, and Yanhecerida. Under some classification schemes, the plectronoceratoid grade may also contain the paraphyletic Cambro-Ordovician Ellesmerocerida. A few older studies consider Plectronocerida to be descended from Ellesmerocerida (rather than ancestral), but this is no longer believed to be the case.

The Plectronocerida is the earliest group of the four, and may have given rise to the other three. Of these four orders, only the Ellesmerocerida crossed (barely) into the Ordovician, with two genera, Ectenolites and Clarkoceras. Ordovician ellesmerocerids in turn likely gave rise to several new nautiloid superorders: Endoceratoidea, Multiceratoidea, and Orthoceratoidea. The Ordovician-Triassic Orthoceratoids are ancestral to post-Paleozoic groups such as ammonoids (ammonites) and coeloids (modern cephalopods without external shells). The origin of modern nautilids is less certain, though they may be descended from coiled multiceratoids or orthoceratoids. Ellesmerocerida proper are restricted to the Paleozoic, though their indirect descendants survive to the present.

Plectronoceratoids are generally small to tiny forms with orthoconic or endogastric shells, a few being exogastric, with proportionally large ventral siphuncles that contain numerous diaphragms. Orders are determined principally by differences in siphuncle detail.
