= Yanhecerida =

Yanhecerida Temporal range: Stage 10

Scientific classification
- Kingdom: Animalia
- Phylum: Mollusca
- Class: Cephalopoda
- Subclass: Nautiloidea
- Superorder: †Plectronoceratoidea
- Order: †Yanhecerida; Chen et al., 1979

Genera
- Yanheceratidae: Aetheloxoceras; Archendoceras; Oonendoceras; Yanheceras

Extinct order of molluscs

Yanhecerida is a small order of Late Cambrian (mid-Stage 10) nautiloid cephalopods. They were similar to the more diverse Plectronocerida and Ellesmerocerida, with short shells, closely spaced septa, and diaphragms (partitions) within the siphuncle. Their most distinctive trait is the conical shape of the diaphragms, similar to the endocones which characterize the later nautiloid order Endocerida. While some authors have argued that Yanhecerida should be lumped into Ellesmerocerida, a phylogenetic analysis has maintained that Yanhecerida is a valid clade of early cephalopods closely related to a paraphyletic Ellesmerocerida (and by extension all post-Cambian cephalopods).
