= Jiagouceras =

Jiagouceras Temporal range: Upper Cambrian (m-u Tremp)

Scientific classification
- Kingdom: Animalia
- Phylum: Mollusca
- Class: Cephalopoda
- Subclass: Nautiloidea
- Order: †Plectronocerida
- Family: †Plectronoceridae
- Genus: †Jiagouceras; Chen, 1979

Extinct genus of molluscs

Jiagouceras is a genus of early primitive cephalopods from the Upper Cambrian of China, assigned to the Plectronoceratidae. The shell is small, nearly straight with a slight endogastric curvature and compressed cross section. The siphuncle is close to the ventral margin, with segments expanded into the chambers.

Jiagouceras is found in the Wanwankou member of the Fengshan formation (Early, Middle and Upper Trempealeauan) in northern Anhui, China. It is similar to Paraplectronoceras except for having more strongly expanded siphuncular segments and less concave septa.
