= Quebecoceras =

Quebecoceras Temporal range: L Ordovician

Scientific classification
- Kingdom: Animalia
- Phylum: Mollusca
- Class: Cephalopoda
- Subclass: Nautiloidea
- Order: †Ellesmerocerida
- Family: †Ellesmeroceratidae
- Genus: †Quebecoceras; Foeste, 1925

Extinct genus of molluscs

Quebecoceras is an extinct genus from the nautiloid order Ellesmerocerida that lived during the Gasconadian Stage at the beginning of the Early Ordovician.

Quebecoceras is a cyrtoconic, similar to Dakeoceras and Paradakeoceras except for having a circular cross section and more persistent curvature and rate of expansion. Paradakeoceras differs in having a somewhat flattened venter.

The only known species, Quebecoceras quebecense, is half again a large as the largest known Dakeoceras, making it a fairly large ellesmeroceratid genus.

== See also ==
- List of nautiloids
