= Ascoceratidae =

Ascoceratidae Temporal range: Middle Ordovician - Upper Silurian

Scientific classification
- Domain: Eukaryota
- Kingdom: Animalia
- Phylum: Mollusca
- Class: Cephalopoda
- Order: †Ascocerida
- Family: †Ascoceratidae; Barrande, 1867

Subfamilies and genera
- See text

Extinct family of molluscs

Ascoceratidae is a family of Ascocerida, bizarre orthoceratoid cephalopods, with longiconic, deciduous early growth stages which undergo period truncation and an inflated breviconic mature ascoceroid stage. The Ascoceratidae are divided into two, unequal subfamilies.

Ascoceratinae have an exogastric ascoceroid stage characterized by the development of a protruding neck ending at the aperture, both ocular and hyponomic sinuses which form when fully grown, and camerae that are mostly confined to the dorsal half of the shell. The siphuncle is close to the venter and found only in the adapical portion. Siphuncle segments nummuloidal (beaded in appearance), septal necks cyrtochoanitic (flared outwardly) generally with recumbent (bent back on themselves) brims. The deciduous stage, which is the juvenile or immature, is orthoconic to cytroconic, with long but variable camerae, siphuncle with orthochoanitic septal necks and tubular segments, and generally straight sutures.

Ascoceratinae includes the following genera, Ascoceras, Aphragmites, Billingsites, Glossoceras, Lindtroemoceras, Parascoceras, Suchertoceras. With the exception of Billingsites and Suchertoceras, which are from the Ordovician, these genera are all Silurian.

Probillingsitinae, Ascoceratidae in which the mature breviconic portion is globose, with only a short, indistinct apertural neck, obliquely oriented septa and oblique sinuous sutures. The immature deciduous portion is unknown. Probliingsitinae, which is known only from the middle and upper Ordovician was named by Rousseau Flower, 1941, to contain the following two genera. Probillingstites and what is probably its senior synonym, Shamatawaceras
