= Protactinocerida =

Protactinocerida Temporal range: Upper Cambrian

Scientific classification
- Domain: Eukaryota
- Kingdom: Animalia
- Phylum: Mollusca
- Class: Cephalopoda
- Subclass: Nautiloidea
- Superorder: †Plectronoceratoidea
- Order: †Protactinocerida; Chen et al., 1979

Genera
- Protactinoceridae: Benxioceras; Mastoceras; Physalactinoceras; Protactinoceras; Sinoeremoceras; Wanwanoceras

Extinct order of molluscs

Protactinocerida is a proposed order of Late Cambrian nautiloid cephalopods. Their fossils have only been found in the Late Cambrian (late Jiangshanian to early Stage 10) of North China, a diversity pattern similar to other early cephalopod orders.

They were very similar to members of the order Plectronocerida in most respects. Like plectronocerids, their shells were compressed and slightly curved, containing numerous closely-spaced septa. The connecting rings have a calciosiphonate structure, while the siphuncle is divided by narrow partitions known as diaphragms. Protactinocerids were originally differentiated from plectronocerids based on their proportionally wider siphuncle. For many proposed protactinocerid genera, this may be a misinterpretation of fossil cross-sections exposed along a shallower angle than in plectronocerid fossils. Nevertheless, a very broad siphuncle (more than half the width of the shell) does seem to be valid for Protactinoceras at least. Another supposed distinguishing trait is the presence of calcite deposits between the diaphragms. However, it is difficult to distinguish biological calcite deposition from later diagenetic infilling, so this trait is also dubious. Some authors have suggested merging Protactinocerida into Plectronocerida in light of the uncertainty in differentiating the two orders.
