= Paradakeoceras =

Paradakeoceras Temporal range: Tremadocian

Scientific classification
- Domain: Eukaryota
- Kingdom: Animalia
- Phylum: Mollusca
- Class: Cephalopoda
- Subclass: Nautiloidea
- Order: †Ellesmerocerida
- Family: †Ellesmeroceratidae
- Genus: †Paradakeoceras; Flower, 1964

Species
- P. minor Flower, 1964; P. planiventrum Flower, 1964; Levisoceras complanatum Unklesbay, 1954 (Synonymous); Burenoceras barnesi (Some specimens synonymous)

Extinct genus of molluscs

Paradakeoceras is a genus of early Ordovician cephalopods belonging to the nautiloid order Ellesmerocerida.

== Morphology ==
The shell of Paradakeoceras is an expanding endogastric cyrtocone with the siphuncle situated near the shell's concave margin. A raised ring exists at the base of the body chamber, which is often preserved as a mould.

Paradakeoceras was named by Flower, 1964, for species previously included in Dakeoceras in which the cross section is broadened with consequent loss of lateral lobes in the suture.

Paradakeoceras shows a flattening of the venter which distinguishes it from Quebecoceras and has a reduction in the rate of expansion similar to that of Dakeoceras.
