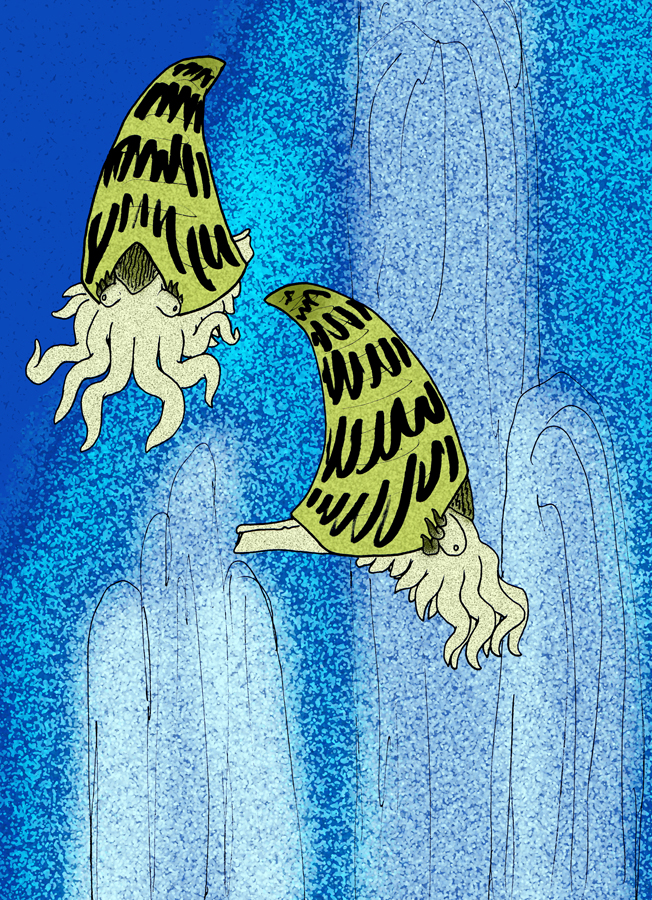
- artist's restoration of L. edwardsi

Scientific classification
- Kingdom: Animalia
- Phylum: Mollusca
- Class: Cephalopoda
- Subclass: Nautiloidea
- Order: †Ellesmerocerida
- Family: †Ellesmeroceratidae
- Genus: †Levisoceras; Flower, 1964

= Levisoceras =

Levisoceras Temporal range: Tremadocian

Extinct genus of molluscs

Levisoceras is a genus of early Ordovician ellesmerocerid cephalopods.

== Morphology ==
Levisoceras is a distinctive ellesmeroceratid that combines rapid expansion a strong endogastric curvature. The cross section is compressed with the height increasing more rapidly than the width. The siphuncle is ventral and expands much as the shell itself. In one specimen the height was found to be around four centimetres and the width 2.5 cm. The septa are approximately flat.

== Taxonomic Relations ==
Some 14 or so species have been named. Those more gently expanding approach Dakeoceras in form. There is also an apparent transition between Levisoceras and Burenoceras.

== Ecology ==
Levisoceras was carnivorous and lived on, and swum above, the sea floor.
