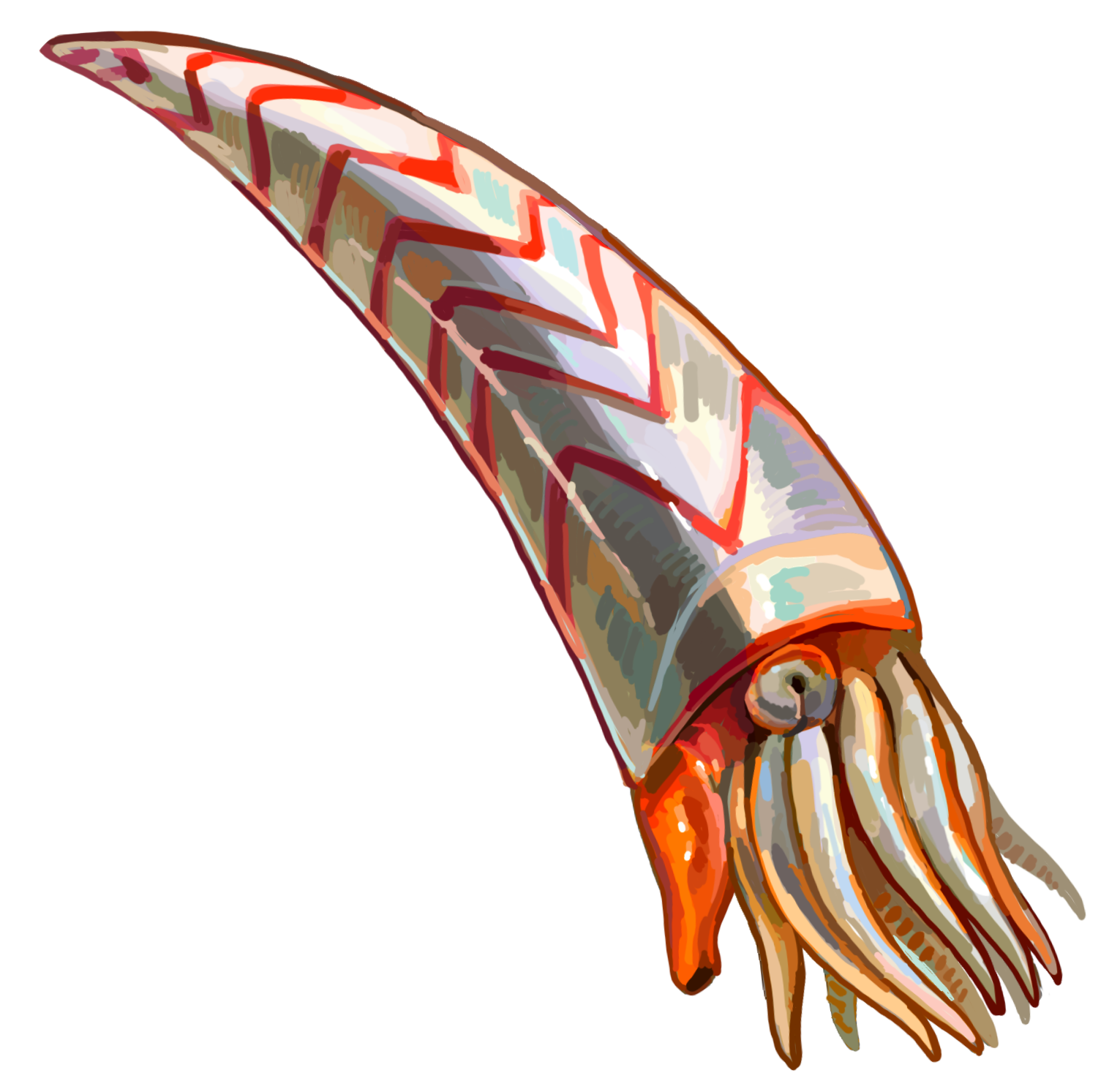
- Life restoration

Scientific classification
- Kingdom: Animalia
- Phylum: Mollusca
- Class: Cephalopoda
- Subclass: Nautiloidea
- Order: †Plectronocerida
- Family: †Plectronoceridae
- Genus: †Plectronoceras; Ulrich & Foerste, 1933

Species
- †Plectronoceras cambria Walcott, 1905

= Plectronoceras =

Plectronoceras Temporal range: Cambrian 501–488.3 Ma

Genus of mollusc

Plectronoceras is an extinct genus of early shelled cephalopod, dating to the Late Cambrian. None of the fossils are complete, and none show the apex or aperture of the shell. Around half of its shell was filled with septa; 7 were recorded in a 2 centimetres (0.79 in) shell. Its shell contains transverse septa separated by about half a millimetre, with a siphuncle on its concave side. It is among the oldest known shelled cephalopods (the Early Cambrian Eoceras being older), and its morphology matches closely that hypothesised for the last common ancestor of all cephalopods.

Plectronoceras is the type genus of the family Plectronoceratidae. Fossils of Plectronoceras have been found in the San Saba Limestone of Texas, United States and in Yunnan, China.

Several species have been included in the genus Plectronoceras, though a 2024 review reorganized their taxonomy; P. exile and P. gracile were synonymyzed with Palaeoceras mutabile, while P. huaibeiense and P. liaotungense were synonymyzed with P. cambria, the type species of Plectronoceras.
