= Protocycloceratidae =

Protocycloceratidae Temporal range: Lower Ordovician

Scientific classification
- Kingdom: Animalia
- Phylum: Mollusca
- Class: Cephalopoda
- Subclass: Nautiloidea
- Order: †Ellesmerocerida
- Family: †Protocycloceratidae; Kobayashi, 1935

Genera
- See text

Protcycloceratidae is an extinct family of slender, commonly annulate, members of the cephalopod order Ellesmerocerida that lived during the Early Ordovician.

Protocycloceratidae, named by Kobayashi (1935), are characterized by transversely ribbed, elongate shells that may be straight or slightly curved, as to be either endogastric or exogastric. Although not universally accepted, Kröger and Mutvie (2005) revised the Protocycloceratidae to include only those ellesmerocerids that have straight transverse sutures and siphuncles with concave segments and thick connecting rings.

Protocycloceratidae (sensu Flower, 1964) includes the follow genera, given with brief descriptions.

- Protocycloceras. Strongly annulate orthocones; cross section circular; annulations and sutures transverse and essentially straight; siphuncle tubular, ventral but not marginal, about 0.3 corresponding shell diameter. Lower Ordovician, cosmopolitan.
- Catoraphiceras. Annulate orthoconic shells with a circular to slightly depressed cross section, marginal siphuncle, and sutures characterized by a deep ventral lobe. Upper Lower Ordocician, widespread.
- Diastoloceras. Lngicones with a slight exogastric curvature and circular cross section, surface with close spaced prominent flanges; siphuncle submarginal, relatively narrow, segments expanded, necks very short, connecting rings thin. Lower/Upper Ordocian, Australia.
- Ectocycloceras. Compressed exogastric annulated cyrtocones with straight transevse sutures and a small marginal siphuncle composed of concave segments. Lower/Middle Ordovician, Eastern North America.
- Endocycloceras. Rapidly expanding endogastric forms with well-developed surface annulations and a marginal siphuncle composed of concave segments. Sutures straight and transverse. Early Lower Ordovician (Gasconadian Stage) of North America.
- Kyminoceras. Generally small, straight annulated shells with straight transverse sutures, circular cross section, and a small ventral siphuncle. However connecting rings in the type appear to be thin, putting its inclusion in question.
- Notocycloceras. Straight shells with transverse annuli, apparently straight transverse sutures, and a comparatively large ventro-marginal siphuncle composed of faintly concave segments. Upper Lower Ordovician, Australia.
- Rudolfoceras. A genus of moderately expanding, annulated slender exogastruc shells with generally straight sutures and tubular siphuncle that may be in contact with the ventral margin. May include species in which sutures are faintly sinuous. Upper Lower Ordovician, Champlain Valley, North America.
- Apocrinoceras, in which siphuncle segments are expanded and septal necks weakly cyrtochoanitic, included in the Protocycloceratidae in the Treatise (Furnish & Glenister 1964), is included in the Apocrinoceratidae (Flower, 1964).
