= Cyclostomiceratidae =

Cyclostomiceratidae Temporal range: Early Ordovician

Scientific classification
- Domain: Eukaryota
- Kingdom: Animalia
- Phylum: Mollusca
- Class: Cephalopoda
- Subclass: Nautiloidea
- Order: †Ellesmerocerida
- Family: †Cyclostomiceratidae; Foerse, 1925

Genera
- See text

Extinct family of molluscs

Cyclostomiceratidae, from Ancient Greek κύκλος (kúklos), meaning "circle", στόμα (stóma), meaning "mouth", and κέρας (kéras), meaning "horn", is an extinct family of Early Ordovician, (Cassinian), ellesmerocerid cephalopods characterized by short, essentially straight shells, a fairly rapidly expanding phragmocone and a ventral siphuncle in which septal necks are almost non-existent and connecting rings are thick and layered. As typical of the Ellesmerocerida, chambers are short, septa close spaced.

== Genera ==
Five genera are recognized; Cyclostomiceras, Eocyclostomiceras, Microstomiceras, Paracyclostomiceras, and Pictetoceras. Cyclostomiceras and Paracyclostomiceras were described in Flower (1964).

Cyclostomiceras Hyatt 1900, found in the Fort Cassin Limestone of Champlain Valley, the Smithville Formation of Arkansas, and the Arneg of Chile, has a straight shell with a fairly rapidly expanding early portion, slightly depressed cross section.
Paracyclostomiceras Cicioni 1953 is a slightly more slender cyclostomicerid from Argentina with an oblique aperture and slight ventral and dorsal lobes.

Microstomiceras and Pictetoceras come from the Middle Ordovician Hälludden cliff section, Oland Island, Sweden, associated with such as Paldoceras.
