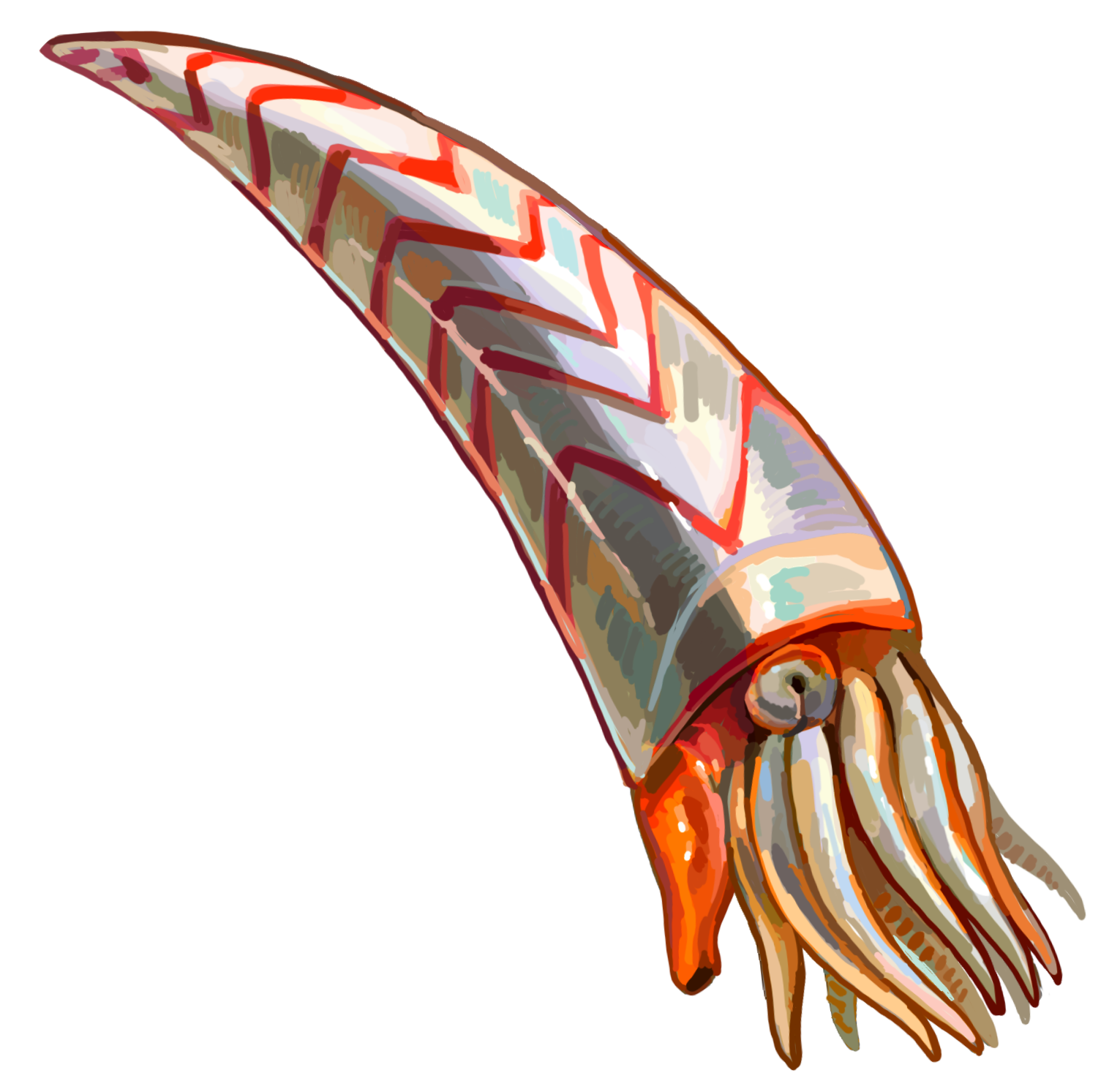
- Plectronoceras life restoration

Scientific classification
- Kingdom: Animalia
- Phylum: Mollusca
- Class: Cephalopoda
- Subclass: Nautiloidea
- Superorder: †Plectronoceratoidea
- Order: †Plectronocerida; Teichert, 1988

Families and genera
- Plectronoceratidae †Plectronoceras †Paraplectronoceras †Eodiaphragmoceras †Jiagouceras †Lunanoceras †Paleoceras Balkoceratidae †Balkoceras †Theskaloceras

= Plectronocerida =

Plectronocerida Temporal range: Upper Cambrian

Extinct order of molluscs

Plectronocerida is a primitive order from which subsequent cephalopod orders are ultimately derived.

== Occurrence ==
Plectronoceratids are known from the Upper Cambrian (upper Franconian – middle Trempealeauan) of China and North America (Minnesota, Wisconsin). Two families are recognized (Flower, 1964), the generally straight to endogastric Plectronoceratidae and the slightly exogastric Balkoceratidae.

== Diagnostic characters ==
Members of the Plectronocerida are characterized as follows. Shells are generally small, some even tiny, laterally compressed, curved (cyrtoconic) or straight (orthoconic). Most cyrtoconic forms are endogastric, with the ventral side longitudinally concave, or the dorsal side more longitudinally convex. A few, the two known genera in Balkoceratidae are exogastrically curved, with the ventral side convex and dorsal side concave. Septa are close spaced, in some less than a millimeter. Siphuncles are ventral, and in most, proportionally large. Connecting rings are in general poorly calcified and may expand as siphonal bulbs into the chambers where not restricted by septal necks.

As with all shelled cephalopods, plectronocerids had a tube called a siphuncle, which let them fill the chambers of their phragmocone with gas instead of water, thus controlling their buoyancy. They were not, however, adapted for jet-powered swimming.

== Phylogeny ==
The Plectronoceratida gave rise in the Late Cambrian (early and middle Trempealeauan) to the other three plectronoceratoid orders, the Ellesmerocerida and Protactinocerida and Yanhecerida. The Plectronoceratidae gave rise to the other ellesmerocerid families, including the Upper Cambrian exogastric Balkoceratidea, and with remote possibility to the Discosorida. The Balkoceratidae are unrelated to later exogastric forms that first appeared in the Ordovician.

== Ecology ==
Plectronocerids were probably benthic animals that crawled along the bottom in search of food or safety, facing downwards, with the shell carried above. Nothing is known of their specific soft-part anatomy or to what extent tentacles, if any, had developed.
