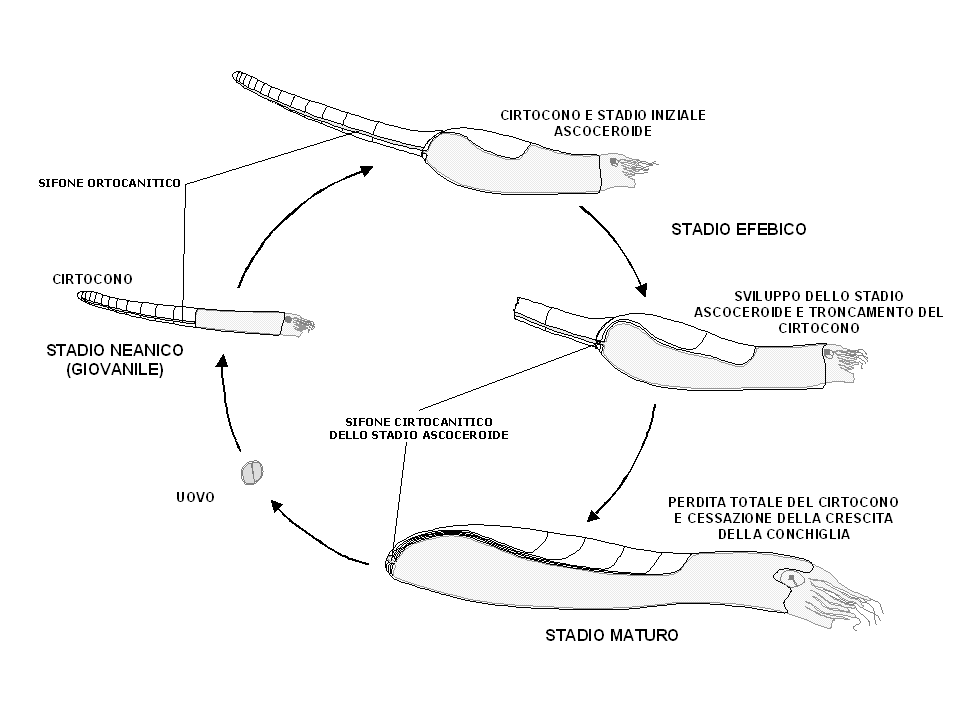
- The ontogeny of Ascoceras, an ascoceratid

Scientific classification
- Kingdom: Animalia
- Phylum: Mollusca
- Class: Cephalopoda
- Subclass: †Orthoceratoidea
- Order: †Ascocerida; Kuhn, 1949

Families
- †Ascoceratidae †Choanoceratidae †Hebetoceratidae

= Ascocerida =

Ascocerida Temporal range: Middle Ordovician–Late Silurian

Extinct order of molluscs

Ascocerida (drawn from Ascoceras, which comes from the Greek askos, a vessel, and keras, horn) is an order of comparatively small nautiloids in the subclass Orthoceratoidea, known from Ordovician and Silurian sediments in Europe and North America. They are believed to have diverged from other orthoceratoids, possibly clinoceratids, during the Middle Ordovician, though fossils of them from this time are rare. While they suffered from the Late Ordovician Mass Extinction, they recovered in the Silurian and became extinct at the end of that period.

Members of the family are characterised by a long projection towards the rear end of their shells, known as the deciduous conch, which detached in maturity or after death. Near the shell tip, the camerae (chambers) running through the shell became restricted to the upper portion. This would have provided excellent buoyancy while in a horizontal position.

== History of discovery ==
The first known fossils of ascocerids came from late Silurian strata in Bohemia (part of what is now the Czech Republic), and were reported by French palaeontologist Joachim Barrande in 1848 and 1855. All specimens were classified by Barrande as Ascoceras. Subsequently, ascocerids were reported from the Ordovician and Silurian of North America, and the Silurian of England and Sweden.

== Description ==
Like many orthoceratoid lineages, juvenile ascocerids possess a long, narrow structure on the posterior (rearward, away from the beak) portion of the shell, known as the deciduous conch, which would likely be shed with maturity or post-mortem. The apical end (tip) of the deciduous conch is best known from Parascoceras. In adulthood, the shell was breviconic, meaning that it was comparatively short and blunt. The apical end contained a septum (partition) around three times as thick as the other internal septa, and almost as thick as the external shell. Towards the apical end, the septa become confined to the dorsal (upper) portion of the shell, resulting in a series of dorsal chambers, or camerae, that provided stabilising buoyancy. Horizontal stability would have been considerably improved by this condition, which is also observed in orthoceratids. The mature part of the shell, also known as the ascoceroid conch, is thinner and more fragile in ascocerids than in any other orthocone of comparable size; this accounts for the rarity of their preservation. Some specimens preserve a hyponomic sinus, also known as the siphuncular displacement canal, an indentation on the ventral (bottom) side of the shell which would have served as an opening for the siphon.

== Taxonomy ==
Ascocerida likely branched from orthoceratoids in the early Middle Ordovician, though Ordovician fossils are rare. Rosseau H. Flower suggested that they derived from the family Clinoceratidae, possibly from Clinoceras itself, through taxa such as Montyoceras and Hebetoceras. The connection between these slender deciduous forms and the typically ascoceroid Probillingsites from the early Upper Ordovician can be made through Redpathoceras. Ascocerids appear to have undergone a major reduction in biodiversity during the Late Ordovician Mass Extinction, though recovered in the Silurian, becoming abruptly extinct at its end.

=== Internal relationships ===
Three ascoceridan families were recognised by Curt Teichert in 1964: Ascoceratidae (divided into Ascoceratinae and Probillingsitinae), Choanoceratidae, and Hebetoceratidae.

== Paleoecology ==
A mature ascocerid, lacking its deciduous conch, would have been an effective swimmer. When the shell was in a horizontal position, the dorsal position of the camerae would have provided a stable centre of buoyancy directly above the centre of gravity. The presence of a hyponomic sinus in some taxa suggests effective jet propulsion. Due to the fragmentary nature of most deciduous conches, little can be said about the palaeoecology of juvenile ascocerids, though W. M. Furnish and Brian F. Glenister noted they were almost certainly nektobenthic, swimming near the seabed.

== Additional sources ==
- Rousseau H. Flower (Sep 1941). "Development of the Mixochoanites". Journal of Paleontology. 15 (5). Paleontological Society: 523–548. JSTOR 1298810.
- Holland, Charles Hepworth (1999). "The nautiloid cephalopod order Ascocerida in the British Silurian". Palaeontology. 42 (4): 683–689. doi:10.1111/1475-4983.00092.
