= Apocrinoceratidae =

Apocrinoceratidae Temporal range: Middle Ordovician

Scientific classification
- Kingdom: Animalia
- Phylum: Mollusca
- Class: Cephalopoda
- Subclass: Nautiloidea
- Order: †Discosorida
- Family: †Apocrinoceratidae; Flower, 1957

Genera
- See text

Extinct family of molluscs

Apocrinoceratidae constitutes a family of Middle Ordovician nautiloid cephalopods characterized by straight or slightly curved, transversely ribbed shells having siphuncles composed of expanded segments, short recurved septal necks, and thick connecting rings. Derivation is from the Protocycloceratidae, a family of ellesmerocerids, which differ in having straight or concave siphuncle segments, but are otherwise similar in form.

Apocrinoceratidae was established by Rousseau Flower (in Flower & Teichert, 1957) repeated in Flower (1964) for the genus Apocrinoceras (Teichert & Glenister, 1954). Four additional genera are included; Desioceras and Glenisteroceras (Flower and Teichert 1957, Flower 1964),Bakeroceras (Hook and Flower 1977), and Paldoceras (Kröger et al 2009).

Apocrinoceratidae was removed from the Ellesmerocerida to the Discosorida by Kröger et al (2009) based in the inclusion of Paldoceras interpreted as a morphologic intermediary between Apocrinoceras and Reudemannoceras. Paldoceras however is rather dissimilar, being more strongly cyrtoconic (curved) and lacking the characteristic annulations.
