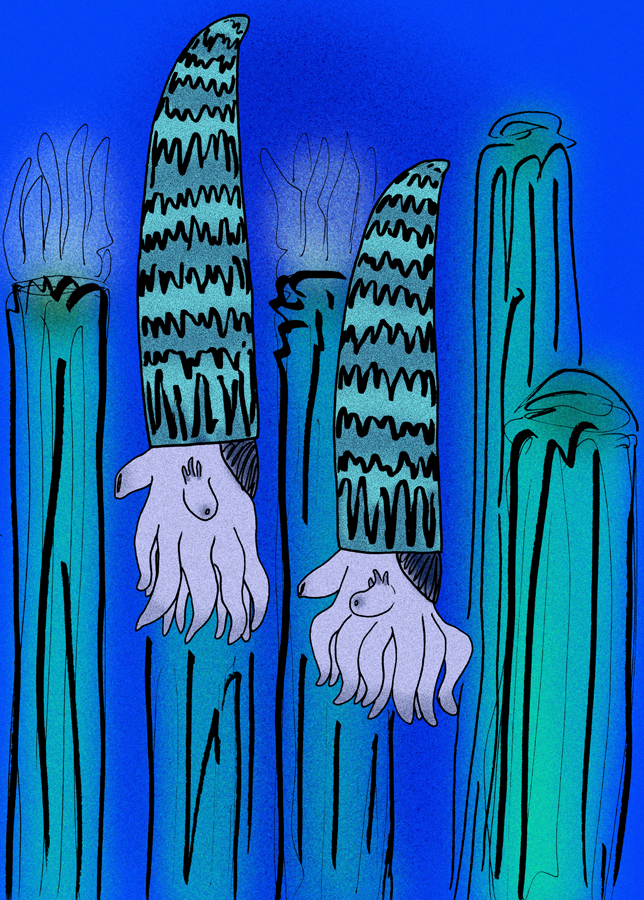
- Artist's restoration of E. scheii

Scientific classification
- Domain: Eukaryota
- Kingdom: Animalia
- Phylum: Mollusca
- Class: Cephalopoda
- Subclass: Nautiloidea
- Order: †Ellesmerocerida
- Family: †Ellesmeroceratidae
- Genus: †Ellesmeroceras; Foeste, 1921

= Ellesmeroceras =

Ellesmeroceras Temporal range: Lower Ordovician

Ellesmeroceras is the type genus for the Ellesmeroceratidae, a family of primitive nautiloid cephalopods, that is characterized by its small, generally compressed, gradually expanded, orthoconic shell, found in Lower Ordovician marine sediments. The septa are close spaced and the siphuncle is ventral, about 0.2 the diameter of the shell. Septal necks are typically orthochoanitic (short, straight) but may slant inwardly (loxochoanitic) or reach halfway to the previous septum (hemichoanitic). Connecting rings are thick. As common for the Ellesmerocerida, Ellesmeroceras has diaphragms within the siphuncle tube.

The type species, Ellesmeroceras scheii, named by Foeste, 1921, was first found on Ellesmere Island in the Canadian arctic, from whence the genus gets its name.

Ellesmeroceras is one of three straight shelled Ellesmeroceratids, the other two being Ectenolites and Eremoceras. It differs from Ectenolites, from which it is probably derived, in being stouter and proportionally wider, and from Eremoceras in being more straight overall.
