= Body whorl =

Shell morphology in gastropod mollusks

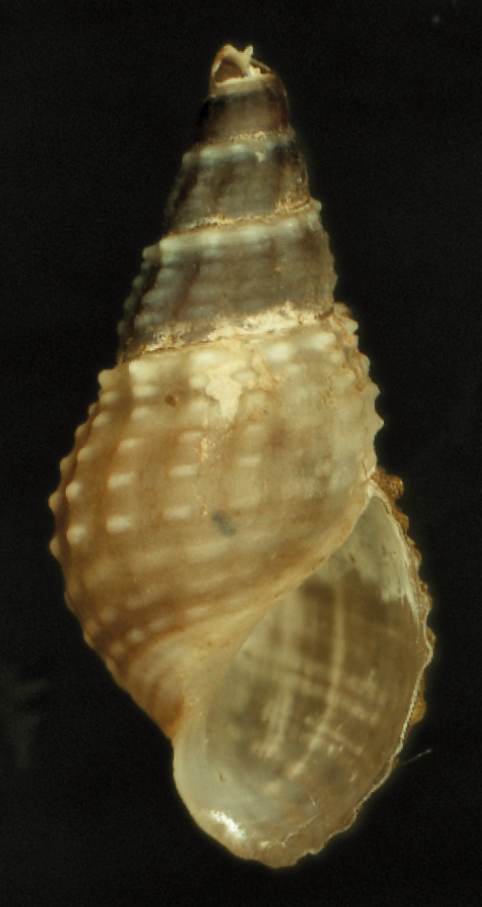
Apertural view of the shell of adult Tarebia granifera showing its pale brown body whorl and dark spire.

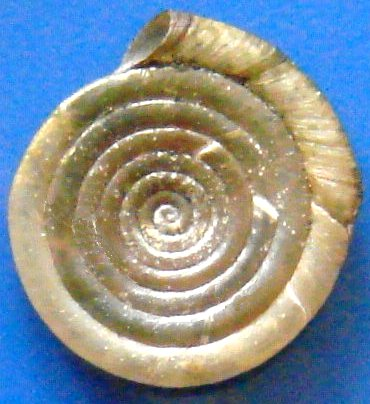
View of the spire side of the planispiral shell of the freshwater snail Anisus septemgyratus. The body whorl is the outermost complete revolution of the shell spiral

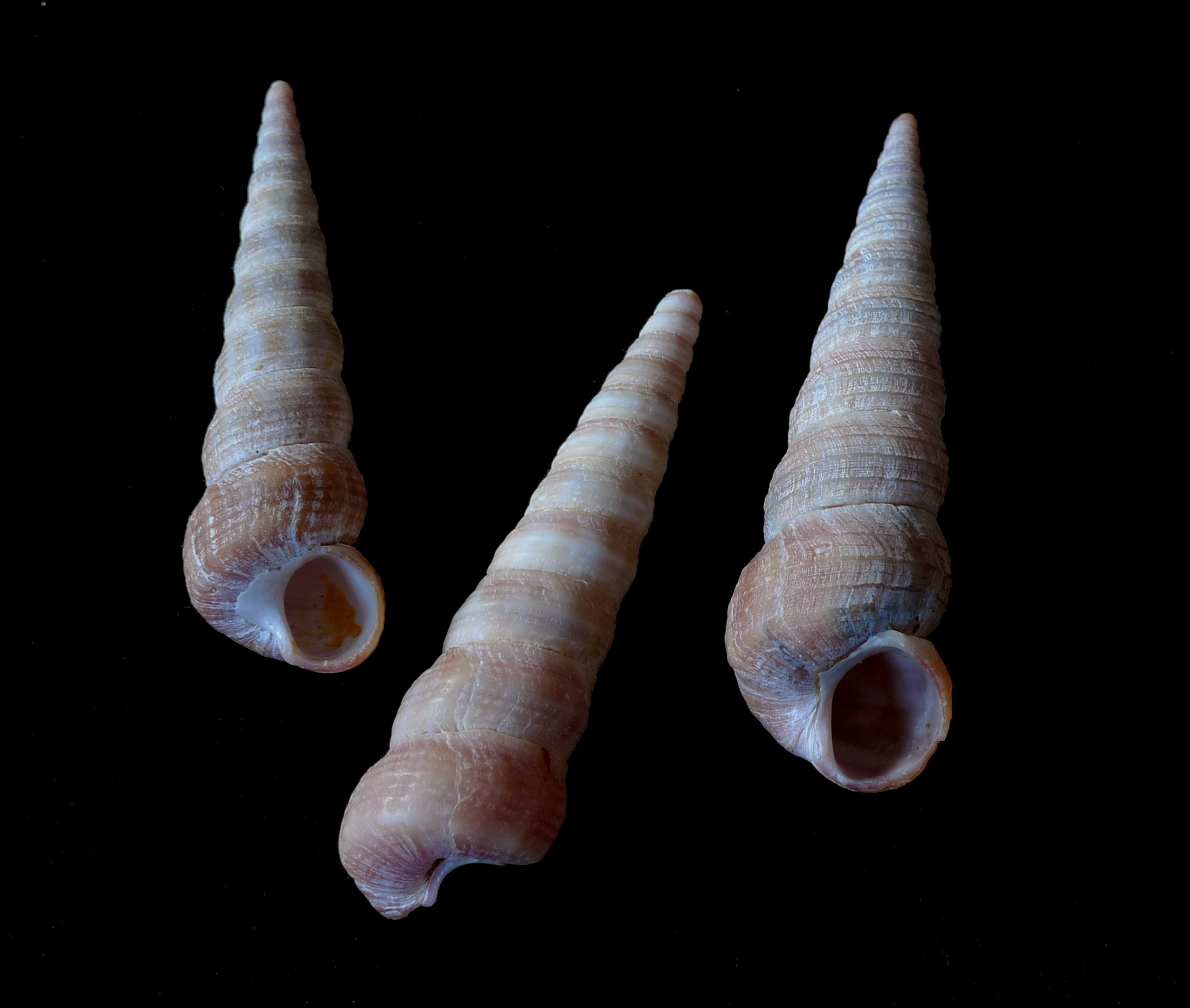
Three shells of the sea snail species Turritella communis. The body whorl shows in this side view as the last complete turn of the shell spiral, the part of the shell that leads up to the aperture

The body whorl is part of the morphology of the shell in those gastropod mollusks that possess a coiled shell. The term is also sometimes used in a similar way to describe the shell of a cephalopod mollusk.

== In gastropods ==
In gastropods, the body whorl, or last whorl, is the last or final complete coil of the shell, measured from the aperture back to where the last half-turn began. The body whorl encompasses the entire volume of the final coil and terminates at the aperture and its margins (peristome), which are an integral part of the body whorl structure. It is called the "body whorl" because most of the body of the soft parts of the animal fits into this whorl.

The proportional size of the body whorl in gastropod shells differs greatly according to the actual shell morphology. For shells in which the rate of whorl expansion of each revolution around the axis is very high, the aperture and the body whorl are large, and the shell tends to be low spired. The shell of the abalone is a good example of this kind of shell.

The opposite tendency can sometimes create a high spire with very little whorl increase per revolution. In these instances, e.g. in the shell of Turritella species, both the body whorl and the aperture are relatively small.

In mollusc shells where there is no elevation at all to the spire, and only moderate whorl expansion, the body whorl can sometimes still represent a large part of the shell, e.g. in some species in the family Planorbidae, such as the genus Segmentina.

== In cephalopods ==
The body chamber or living chamber in shelled cephalopod mollusks is an equivalent space, and is also sometimes called the body whorl. It is the outermost or last chamber in the shell of a nautiloid or ammonoid. The body of the animal occupies the living chamber, apart from the siphuncle which extends through the rest of the septa (the phragmocone) to provide buoyancy.
