= Paraplectronoceras =

Paraplectronoceras Temporal range: Upper Cambrian

Scientific classification
- Domain: Eukaryota
- Kingdom: Animalia
- Phylum: Mollusca
- Class: Cephalopoda
- Subclass: Nautiloidea
- Order: †Plectronocerida
- Family: †Plectronoceridae
- Genus: †Paraplectronoceras; Chen & Qi, 1979

Extinct genus of molluscs

Paraplectronoceras is a genus of very early nautiloids from the middle Late Cambrian, named by Chen and Qi, 1979, type species Paraplectronoceras pyriforme, for small, endogastrically curved forms found in the upper Yenchou and Wanwankou members of the Fengshan Formation of northeastern China.

The shell of Paraplectronoceras is laterally compressed with the dorsal side somewhat more narrowly rounded than the ventral, and is moderately to rapidly expanded. The siphuncle is small, ventral in position, without calcareous deposits. Segments are slightly expanded, pearshaped in early stage. Septal necks are short, curved in early stage, but straight in the adult.

Species of Paraplectronoceras along with another plectronoceratid, Lunanoceras longatum, and the protacinocerid Wanwanoveras exigum have been found in Liaoning and Shandong provinces, in the lower part of the Changia Zone, which is correlated with the earliest Trempealeauan of North America.
