= Paldoceras =

Paldoceras Temporal range: Middle Ordovician

Scientific classification
- Kingdom: Animalia
- Phylum: Mollusca
- Class: Cephalopoda
- Subclass: Nautiloidea
- Order: †Discosorida
- Family: †Apocrinoceratidae
- Genus: †Paldoceras; Kröger, Zhang & Isakar, 2009

Species
- P. neptunsakerense; P. paldiskense

Extinct genus of molluscs

Paldoceras is a genus of nautiloid cephalopods found in the middle Ordovician of Estonia and Sweden, included in the discosorid family Apocrinoceratidae. Two species are recognized; Paldoceras paldiskense found northwest of Paldiski in northern Estonia and Paldoceras neptunsakerense found on Öland Island, Sweden.

Shells are small, on the order of a few centimeters in length at most, gently expanding and moderately endogastric with the siphuncle lying along the inner concave curvature of the shell. Septa are close spaced, less than a millimeter. Siphuncle segments are broadly expanded. Septal necks in paldiskense are short and generally cyrtochoanitic (flared outwardly). Those in neptunsakerense are suborthochoanitic. The later P. paldiskense from 463.5 to ca461 million years ago is also more strongly curved than earlier 472-466 Ma P. neptunsakerense.
