= Bathmoceras =

Bathmoceras Temporal range: Middle and Late Ordovician

Scientific classification
- Domain: Eukaryota
- Kingdom: Animalia
- Phylum: Mollusca
- Class: Cephalopoda
- Subclass: Nautiloidea
- Order: †Cyrtocerinida
- Family: †Bathmoceratidae
- Genus: †Bathmoceras; Barrande, 1867

Bathmoceras is a primitive cephalopod genus from the Middle and Upper Ordovician. It is a member of the order Cyrtocerinida and is the only genus in the family Bathmoceratidae.

== Derivation ==
At one time Bathmoceras was thought to have possibly given rise to Polydesmia, once thought to have been the ancestral actinocerid. Since then revision of actinocerid phylogeny and of Ordovician stratigraphy in east Asia have cast doubts on this hypothesis.

Bathmoceras is most likely derived from Eothinoceras through lengthening of the septal necks and of the inward projections of the connecting rings in a forward direction. Eothinoceras differs in that the septal necks are vestigial rather than being somewhat long as in Bathmoceras and that the inward projections of the connecting rings point straight in rather than projecting forward. Both are straight shelled or slightly exogastric. Eothinoceras is also apparently more slender.

Furnish and Glenister also included Eothinceras in the family Bathmoceratidae. R.H. Flower, 1964, separates the two genera into their respective families within the ellesmerocerid suborder Cyrtocerinina, now known as the order Cyrtocerinida.

== Preservation and occurrence ==
Bathmoceras is of Middle and Late Ordovician age and has been found in northern and central Europe and in the Macdonnell Ranges in central Australia.

The genus is found in Europe and Australia, mostly as internal molds in sandy sediments. One species B. linnarsoni was found in limestone in Sweden which allowed Holms to conduct thin section studies.

== Paleoecology and lifestyle ==
The common occurrence in sandy sediments indicates that Bathmoceras lived over sandy bottom, although some species obviously did spend time over carbonate shelves.

The straight or slightly upwardly curved, exogastric shells with weighted ventral siphuncles indicate a normal horizontal orientation with the aperture facing forward. They were apparently active predators with some degree of mobility. As for the peculiar internal structure of the siphuncle, beyond providing ballast, no reason has been given.

== Description ==
The shells of Bathmoceras are rather large, straight or faintly exogastric. Sutures are simple except for a sharp mid ventral saddle. The siphuncle is large and near the venter, in which the segments have a slightly sinuous outline. Septal necks are rather long. Most diagnostically, the connecting rings are thickened into forward projecting lobes that may extend internally two or three segments within the siphuncle.
