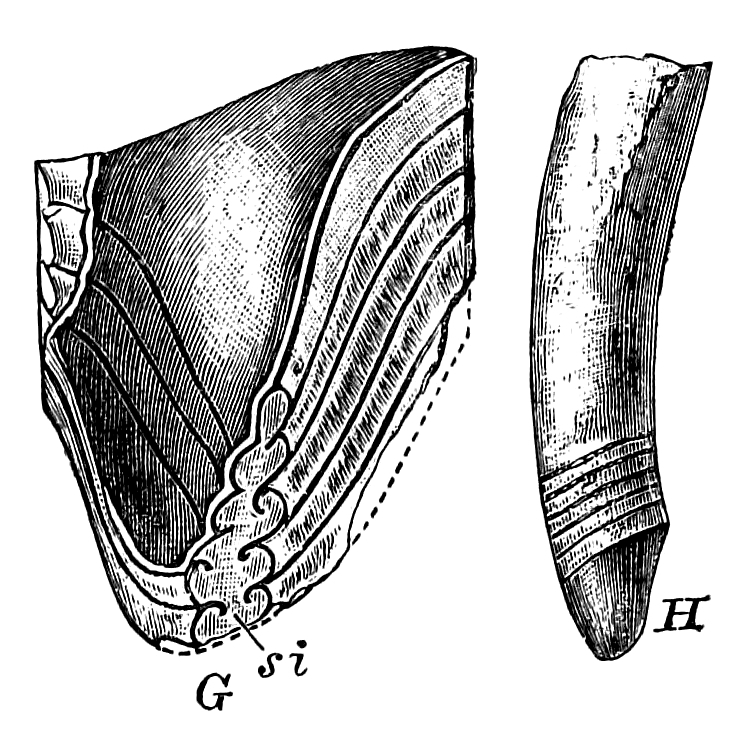

Scientific classification
- Kingdom: Animalia
- Phylum: Mollusca
- Class: Cephalopoda
- Order: †Orthocerida
- Family: †Choanoceratidae; Miller (1932)
- Genus: †Choanoceras; Miller (1932)

= Choanoceratidae =

Choanoceratidae Temporal range: Mid Silurian

Extinct family of molluscs

The Choanoceratidae is a small, mono-generic, family of extinct orthoceratoid cephalopods in the order Orthocerida that lived in what would be Europe during the middle Silurian from 428.2 to 426.2 mya, existing for approximately 2 million years.

== Taxonomy ==
Chaonoceratidae was named as the family for its sole member Choanoceras by Miller (1932) who, along with Flower (1941) regarded it as belonging to the Ascocerida. It became impossible to trace Choanoceras to the ascocerid lineage however, and based on closer affinities, it was assigned to the Michelinoceratida (Orthocerida equivalent) by Flower in 1962.

== Morphology ==
Choanoceras had a slender, very gently curved shell with a natural truncation where it discarded the apical portion sometime during its life, somewhat resembling earlier ascocerids, with siphuncle segments that became gradually more expanded during growth. Nothing is known of the animal itself.
