= Cyrtocerinidae =

Cyrtocerinidae Temporal range: Ordovician

Scientific classification
- Domain: Eukaryota
- Kingdom: Animalia
- Phylum: Mollusca
- Class: Cephalopoda
- Subclass: Nautiloidea
- Order: †Cyrtocerinida
- Family: †Cyrtocerinidae; Flower, 1946

Genera
- Centrocyrtocerina; Cyrtocerina; Rummoceras?

Extinct family of molluscs

Cyrtocerinidae is a family of nautiloid cephalopods in the Order Cyrtocerinida, previously considered ellesmerocerids. Members of the family have slightly endogastric (inwardly curved) breviconic shells with ventral siphuncles that have connecting rings thickened as lobes that project straight into the interior.

Cyrtocerinidae was established by Flower 1964 for the genus Cyrtocerina Billings 1865, found at various locations across North America. The shells are generally small, laterally compressed, and dorsum more narrowly rounded than the venter.
