= Paleoceras =

Paleoceras Temporal range: Upper Cambrian

Scientific classification
- Domain: Eukaryota
- Kingdom: Animalia
- Phylum: Mollusca
- Class: Cephalopoda
- Subclass: Nautiloidea
- Order: †Ellesmerocerida
- Family: †Ellesmeroceratidae
- Genus: †Paleoceras; Flower, 1954

Extinct genus of molluscs

Paleoceras is a genus of fossil cephalopods from the Upper Cambrian.
