= Shelbyoceras =

Scientific classification
- Kingdom: Animalia
- Phylum: Mollusca
- Class: incertae sedis
- Family: †Scenellidae
- Genus: †Shelbyoceras; Ulrich & Foerste, 1931

Type species
- Shelbyoceras robustum Ulrich & Foerste, 1936

Species
- S. bigpineyensis Stinchcomb, 1986; S. buttsi Ulrich et al., 1943; S. robustum Ulrich & Foerste, 1936; S. unguliforme Ulrich et al., 1943

Extinct genus of molluscs

Shelbyoceras is a genus of Cambrian molluscs which was one of the genera mistaken for a cephalopod, since the characteristics differentiating monoplacophora from cephalopods are few. Shelbyoceras was reclassified based on a depressed groove that forms a band around the shell, which is similar to a feature seen in Hypseloconus (with whom it may be synonymous). The septa in this genus are either closely or irregularly spaced.
