= Phragmocone =

Chambered portion of a cephalopod shell

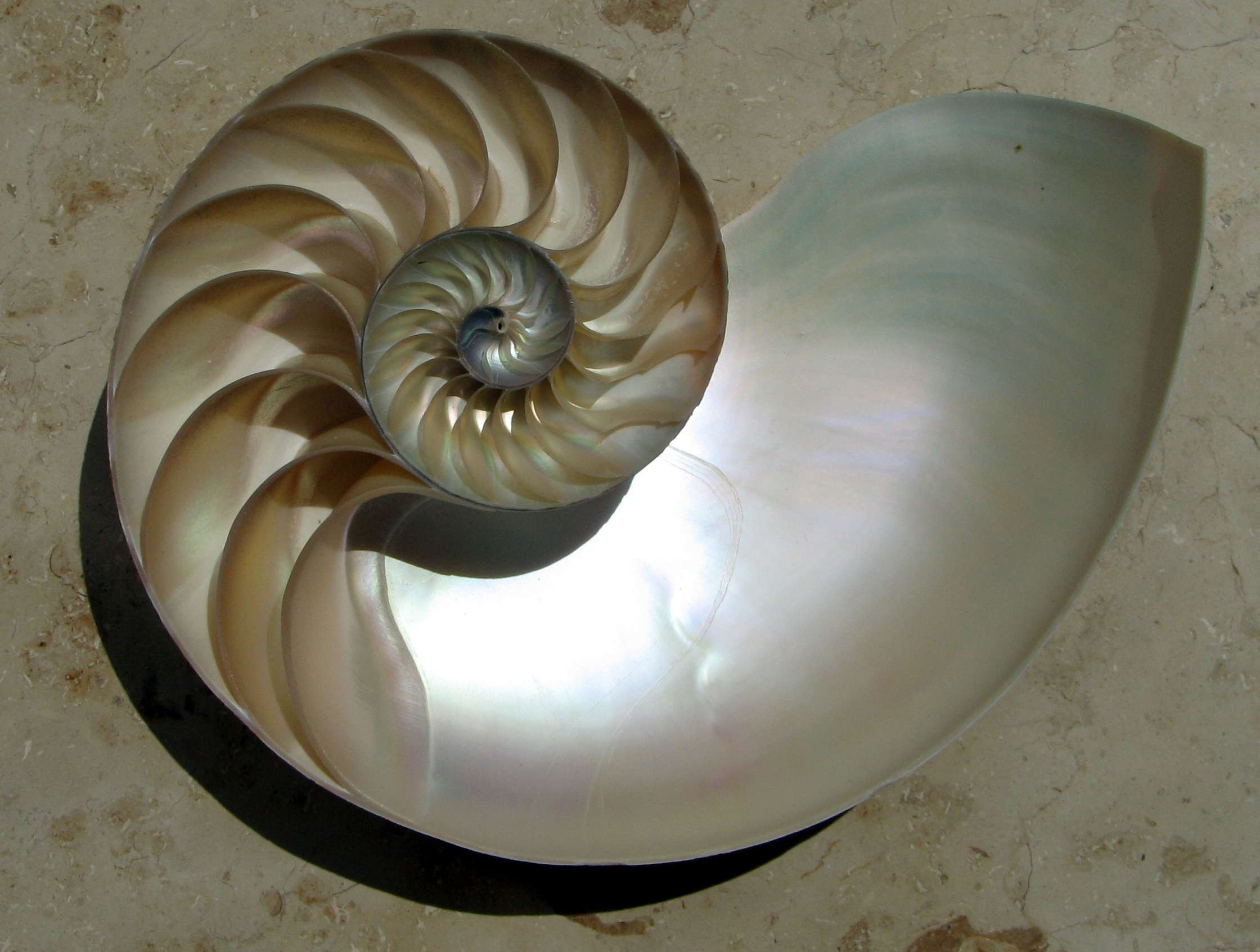
Cutaway of a nautilus shell showing the chambers

The phragmocone is the chambered portion of the shell of a cephalopod. It is divided by septa into camerae.

In most nautiloids and ammonoids, the phragmocone is a long, straight, curved, or coiled structure, in which the camerae are linked by a siphuncle which determines buoyancy by means of gas exchange.

Despite this benefit, such a large shell adds to the mass of the animal, and hence is disadvantageous in catching fast-moving prey. Some nautiloids, such as the Silurian Ascocerida, dropped the phragmocone upon maturity, presumably to increase speed and maneuverability. They thus became the early Paleozoic equivalent of coleoids. The early coleoids and belemnoids adopted a different approach: the phragmocone was retained but became internal and reduced. The shells in modern cephalopods tend to be vestigial or absent.

== Fossil record ==
Being the only biomineralised part of most cephalopods, the phragmocone is typically the only part to enter the fossil record. It is sometimes infilled with sediment, with sediment presumably getting in through the siphuncle. There are occasions where trilobites have been preserved within phragmocones, presumably where they crawled in for refuge.
