= Eothinoceratidae =

Eothinoceratidae Temporal range: Early -Middle Ordovician

Scientific classification
- Domain: Eukaryota
- Kingdom: Animalia
- Phylum: Mollusca
- Class: Cephalopoda
- Subclass: Nautiloidea
- Order: †Cyrtocerinida
- Family: †Eothinoceratidae; Ulrich, Foerste, Miller & Unklesbay, 1944

Genera
- See text

Extinct family of molluscs

Eothinoceratidae is a family of Lower Ordovician nautiloid cephalopods included in the Cyrtocerinida. The family was originally established for the genus Eothinoceras.

== Morphology ==
The Eothinoceratidae as typified by Eothinoceras is characterized by slender slightly exogastric shells with a rather large siphuncle running along the convex ventral margin. Connecting rings are triangular in section and point straight into the interior of the siphuncle. Septal necks are short to absent.

== Genera ==
In addition to the type genus Eothinoceras the family is said to include Conothinoceras, Desioceras, Margaritoceras, Protothinoceras, Sacerdosoceras, and Saloceras summarized here. Desioceras Cecioni 1953 has a generally straight, narrow shell with a circular cross section covered with lirae. The siphuncle is marginal, septal necks are essentially lacking. Sutures show a rounded ventral saddle. Margaritoceras Cecioni and Flower 1985 is found in the Obispo Formation, San Lucas, Bolivia. Conothinoceras and Protothinoceras were both named by Chen and Teichert in 1987, Sacerdosoceras and Saloceras by Evans in 2005. Sacerdosoceras from Great Britain is early Middle Ordovician in age. Saloceras from lower in the section in Great Britain and France is Early Ordovician.
