= Clarkoceras =

Clarkoceras Temporal range: Late Cambrian– Early Ordovician

Scientific classification
- Domain: Eukaryota
- Kingdom: Animalia
- Phylum: Mollusca
- Class: Cephalopoda
- Subclass: Nautiloidea
- Order: †Ellesmerocerida
- Family: †Ellesmeroceratidae
- Genus: †Clarkoceras; Ruedemann, 1905

Extinct genus of molluscs

Clarkoceras is a genus of breviconic ellesmerocerid cephalopods, one of only two genera known to have crossed from the Late Cambrian, Trempealeauan, into the Early Ordovician, Gasconadian. (Flower 1964, Teichert 1988); the other being Ectenolites.

== Description ==
Clarkoceras has a rapidly expanding, laterally compressed, relatively short, endogastrically cyrtoconic shell; The upper or dorsal side is more strongly convex longitudinally than the lower or ventral side is concave. Sutures are essentially straight and close spaced indicating very short camerae (chambers). The siphuncle is relatively large, 0.3 the dorsoventral dimension and is ventral, although not necessarily marginal. (Flower 1964, Furnish and Glenister 1964). Septal necks are straight, reaching about halfway back to the previous septum and the connecting rings are thick and layered

== Taxonomy ==
Clarkoceras was first thought by Clarke to be a pilocerid, who in 1897 give it the name Piloceras newton-winchelli. Ruedemann in 1905 recognized this as belonging to the Ellesmerocerida and renamed it Clarkoceras newton-winchelli (Clarke), which became the genotype.

== Distribution and Range ==
The earliest known Clarkoceras comes from the upper Trempealeauan Wanwankou Member of the Fengshan Formation in northern China, one of twelve ellesmeroceratid genera from the upper Late Cambrian. (Chen and Teichert 1983, Teichert 1988). In North America Clarkoceras is found in early Lower Ordovician, Gasconadian age shallow marine sediments near Smith Basin, State of New York, the Llano Uplift of Central Texas, and the El Paso Group of the eastern Rocky Mountains of Trans-Pecos Texas and Southern New Mexico.
