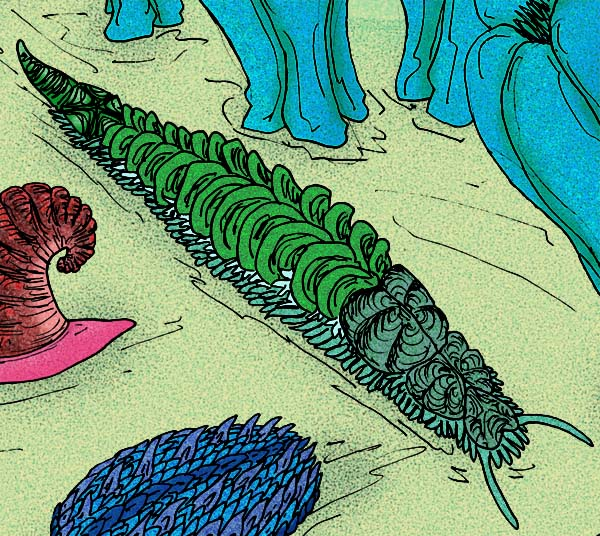
- Tommotia admiranda

Scientific classification
- Kingdom: Animalia
- Phylum: incertae sedis (possibly stem-Brachiopoda)
- Class: incertae sedis
- Order: Mitrosagophora
- Genus: †Tommotia Rozanov & Missarzhevsky, 1966

Species
- †T. admiranda (Rozanov & Missarzhevsky, 1966); †T. baltica (Bengtson 1970); †T. garbowskae (Rozanov & Missarzhevsky, 1966); †T. korolevi (Missarzhevsky & Mambetov, 1981); †T. kozlowskii (Missarzhevsky & Mambetov, 1966); †T. parilobata (Bengtson, 1986); †T. reticulosa (Bengtson et al. 1990)

= Tommotia =

Tommotia Temporal range: Tommotian

Fossil genus

Tommotia is a small shelly fossil from the Early Cambrian Period. Originally, only a cone-shaped shell was recognized, which was originally thought to be an early cephalopod, with either squid-like tentacles or a snail-like foot. More recent investigation has shown that the cone is not the remains of a complete animal, but a sclerite of a larger, soft-bodied animal that would have resembled a chiton or a sea mouse. The fossils called Camanella may be another type of sclerite from the same animal.
