= Clinoceratidae =

Clinoceratidae Temporal range: Ordovician

Scientific classification
- Kingdom: Animalia
- Phylum: Mollusca
- Class: Cephalopoda
- Order: †Orthocerida
- Family: †Clinoceratidae; Flower, 1946

Family of molluscs

Clinoceratidae is an extinct family of actively mobile carnivorous cephalopod of the order Orthocerida that lived in what would be North America and Europe during the middle Ordovician through Early Silurian from 466–443.7 mya, existing for approximately 22.3 million years.

== Taxonomy ==
Clinoceratidae was named by Flower (1946). Its type is Clinoceras. It was assigned to Michelinoceratida by Flower (1962).

== Morphology ==
The shell is usually long, and may be straight ("orthoconic") or gently curved. In life, these animals may have been similar to the modern squid, except for the long shell.
