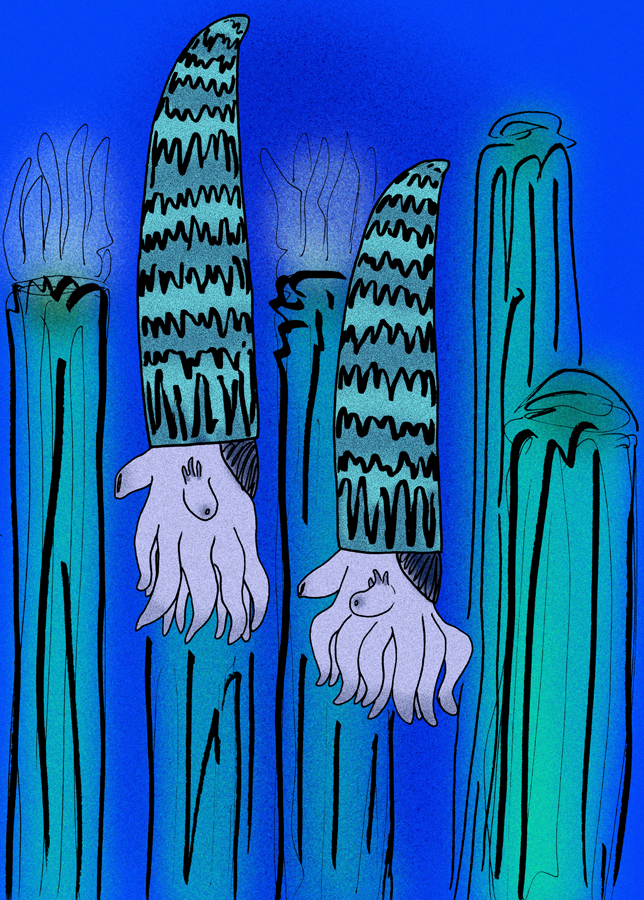
- Ellesmeroceras scheii

Scientific classification
- Kingdom: Animalia
- Phylum: Mollusca
- Class: Cephalopoda
- Subclass: Nautiloidea
- Order: †Ellesmerocerida
- Family: †Ellesmeroceratidae; Kobayashi, 1934

= Ellesmeroceratidae =

Ellesmeroceratidae Temporal range: U Cambrian – L Ordovician

Extinct family of molluscs

The Ellesmeroceratidae constitute a family within the cephalopod order Ellesmerocerida. They lived from the Upper Cambrian to the Lower Ordovician. They are characterized by straight and endogastric shells, often laterally compressed, so the dorso-ventral dimension is slightly greater than the lateral, with close spaced sutures having shallow lateral lobes and a generally large tubular ventro-marginal siphuncle with concave segments and irregularly spaced diaphragms. Connecting rings are thick and layered, externally straight but thickening inwardly with the maximum near the middle of the segment so as to leave concave depressions on internal siphuncle molds. Septal necks are typically orthochoanitic but vary in length from almost absent (achoanitic) to reaching halfway to the previous septum (hemichoanitic) and may even slope inwardly (loxochoanitic).

== Evolution and phylogeny ==
The Ellesmeroceratidae have their derivation in the Plectronoceratidae, order Plectronocerida, in Trempealeauan stage of the Late Cambrian from which time 13 genera have been described. The earliest described, assigned to the Ellesmeroceratidae, is the early Trempealeauan Hunuanoceras, which comes from the lower part of the upper Yenchou Member of the Fengshan Formation in China. Hunuanoceras is a small endogastric cyrtocone resembling the ancestral Plectronoceras except for having resistant calcified connecting rings.

Hunuanoceras is followed by Eburoceras, which first appears in the upper part of the upper Yenchou and continues throughout the overlying Wanwankou Member of the Fengshan. The Wanwankou is middle and early upper Trempealeauan. The remaining eleven genera are restricted to the Wanwankou, except for Clarkoceras and Ectenolites, which persist into the Lower Ordovician. Clarkoceras and Ectenolites provide the ancestry for the diverse ellesmerceratitds of the Early Ordovician, Gasconadian, and those that followed.

The Gasconadian was dominated to virtual exclusion by the Ellesmeroceratidae, which diversified during that time into a variety of forms and genera. Some like Ellesmeroceras and Eremoceras were straight shelled, following the example of Ectenolites. Others like Dakeoceras and Burenoceras were endogastric in the sense of Clarkoceras. Gradations are found between elongate (longiconic) and short (breviconic) forms and between straight (orthoconic) and curved (cyrtoconic) forms, and between those with simple open apertures and those with apertures that have contracted.

The Ellesmeroceratidae gave rise within the Ellesmerocerida to the Protocycloceratidae, Bassleroceratidae, and possibly the Cylostomiceratidae in the early Canadian (late Gasconadian (?), Demingian) and to the Bathmoceratidae, and Cyrtocerinidae in the late Canadian (late Jeffersonian or Cassinian). The Ellesmeroceratidae also gave rise at about the close of the Gasconadian to the Endocerida, Tarphycerida, and to the Orthocerida through the ancestral Baltoceratidae, at which time they cease to be the dominant element in cephalopod faunas.
