= Camera (cephalopod) =

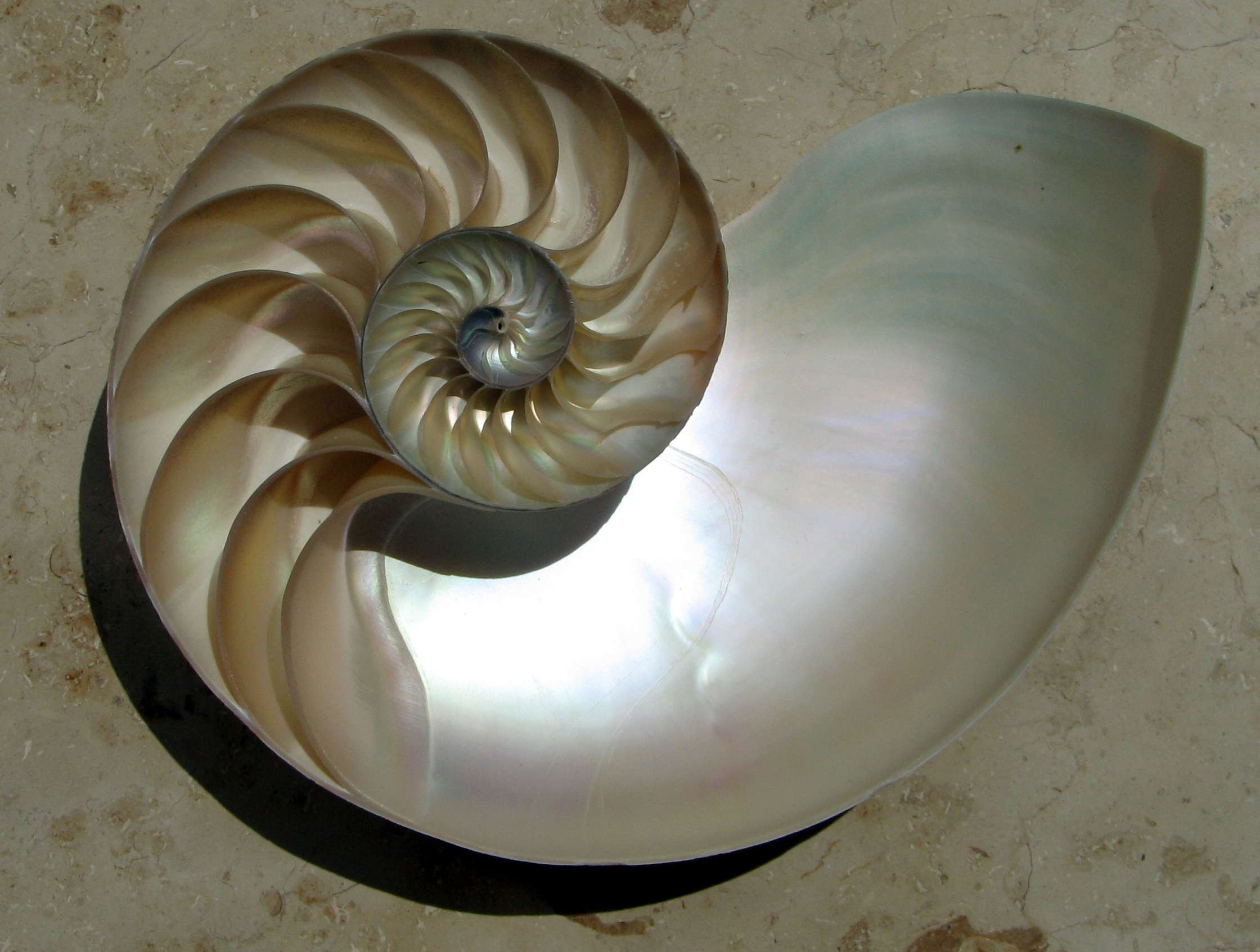
Cutaway of a nautilus shell showing the chambers

Camerae (singular camera) are the spaces or chambers enclosed between two adjacent septa in the phragmocone of a nautiloid or ammonoid cephalopod molluscus. These can be seen in cross-sections of a nautilus shell and in the polished cross-sections of ammonites. In life these chambers are filled with gas, mediated by the siphuncle, and used to control buoyancy.

Some Palaeozoic nautiloid genera, especially those with long, straight shells, are distinguished by cameral deposits. These were accumulations of calcium carbonate secreted in the empty chambers of the shell, used for ballast and control of buoyancy. The nature and form of these deposits are very useful in nautiloid classification.
