= Ectenolites =

Ectenolites Temporal range: Upper Cambrian–Lower Ordovician

Scientific classification
- Kingdom: Animalia
- Phylum: Mollusca
- Class: Cephalopoda
- Subclass: Nautiloidea
- Order: †Ellesmerocerida
- Family: †Ellesmeroceratidae
- Genus: †Ectenolites; Ulrich and Foeste, 1935

Species
- E. abnormis L.-Z. Li, 1984; E. anhuiensis J.-Y. Chen & D.-L. Qi, 1980; E. arbucklensis (Ulrich, Foerste & A. K. Miller, 1943); E. arctoventralis J.-Y. Chen & X.-P. Zou, 1980; E. arcuosutus (Ulrich, Foerste & A. K. Miller, 1943); E. clelandi (Ulrich, Foerste, A. K. Miller & Unklesbay, 1944); E. compressus (Ulrich, Foerste & A. K. Miller, 1943); E. conicus (Malinovskaya, 1964); E. curviseptatus Flower, 1964; E. ellipticus (Ulrich, Foerste & A. K. Miller, 1943); E. exilis (Ulrich, Foerste & A. K. Miller, 1943); E. extensus Flower, 1964; E. higdonensis (Ulrich, Foerste & A. K. Miller, 1943); E. laishuiensis J.-Y. Chen & X.-P. Zou, 1980; E. laqueatus (Ulrich, Foerste & A. K. Miller, 1943); E. lisogorae (Malinovskaya, 1964); E. longicameratus (Malinovskaya, 1964); E. longicollum L.-Z. Li, 1984; E. longiconica L.-Z. Li, 1984; E. longus (Ulrich, Foerste & A. K. Miller, 1943); E. millsi (Ulrich, Foerste & A. K. Miller, 1943); E. mirabilis L.-Z. Li, 1984; E. obliquus (Ulrich, Foerste & A. K. Miller, 1943); E. pergracilis (Ulrich, Foerste & A. K. Miller, 1943); E. petilus J.-Y. Chen & D.-L. Qi, 1982; E. primigenium (Vanuxem, 1842); E. primus Flower, 1964; E. pusillus J.-Y. Chen & Teichert, 1983; E. qiushugouensis J.-Y. Chen & Teichert, 1983; E. sinensis L.-Z. Li, 1984; E. sinuatus Flower, 1964; E. subgracile Ulrich & Foerste, 1936; E. thomasi (Ulrich, Foerste, A. K. Miller & Unklesbay, 1944); E. winonicum (Sardeson, 1896)

Synonyms
- Tamdoceras Malinovskaya, 1964

Extinct genus of molluscs

Ectenolites is a genus of small, slender, cylindrical ellesmeroceratid that resemble Ellesmeroceras but are smaller and proportionally narrower. Septa, as typical for ellesmerocerids, are close spaced with shallow lobes on either flank. The body chamber is proportionally long, the shell itself slightly compressed. The dorsal side at the beginning of the shell, opposite the aperture and body chamber, is strongly convex so to produce a sense of endogastric curvature with the apex and siphuncle aligned.

The siphuncle in Ectenolites lies along the ventral side; is tubular, composed of short orthochoanitic septal necks and thick concave connecting rings. The posterior portion is filled with irregularly spaced transverse diaphragms.

Ectenolites is one of two ellesmeroceratid genera known to have passed from the Late Cambrian into the Early Ordovician (Gasconadian) and is found widespread in North America from the Tribes Hill of New York to the Tanyard of Texas.
