= Gasconadian Stage =

Geologic period, 488–464 million years ago

Gascondian
- 488 ± 2 – 464 ± 2 Ma

Usage information
- Celestial body: Earth
- Regional usage: Regional
- Time scale(s) used: North American

Definition
- Chronological unit: Age
- Stratigraphic unit: Stage

The Gasconadian Stage is the 1st stage of the Ordovician geologic period in North America and of the Lower Ordovician Canadian Epoch, coming immediately after the Late Cambrian Trempealeauan and preceding the middle Canadian Demingian Stage. The Gasconadian is equivalent to the European Tremadocian and roughly to the Skullrockian of the Ibexian series.

The Gasconadian is named for the Gasconade Formation of Missouri, named in turn for the Gasconade River, and is represented by the Tribes Hill Formation in New York state and by the upper Bliss Fm and the Sierrite Ls of the El Paso Group in southern New Mexico and west Texas.

The Gasconadian is a common term in the paleontological and stratigraphic literature of the previous century, whether used simply for a span of time or for strata laid down during that time.

== Time and duration ==
Recent estimates (ICS and Cosuna) place the beginning of Gasconadian, and Ordovician, anywhere from about 488 to 500 million years ago, with a duration ranging from 9.7 to 10 million years respectively putting the end about 464 m.y.a. Both give estimates of over half the Early Ordovician. 60 percent according to the ICS, 2/3 according to Cosuna.

== Strata ==
The Gasconadian (Tremadocian) is represented in southern New Mexico and west Texas by the upper part of the Bliss Formation and the Sierrite Limestone which is the lowermost formation of the Lower Ordovician (Canadian) El Paso Group. The Bliss is a near shore, deltaic, and beach sandstone deposit; the lower part spans the Upper Cambrian. The Sierrite Limestone is a shallow water, carbonate shelf deposit. The contact between the two is gradational.

Generalized stratigraphic sections from the region indicate Gasconadian age strata take between 20 and 40 percent the Lower Ordovician section; 20 percent in Franklin Mtns outside of El Paso, Texas; 40 percent in the Caballo Mtns further north in southern New Mexico. This suggests the Gasconadian may actually take up well less than half the Early Ordovician rather than the principal amount.

== Cephalopods ==
Cephalopods from the Gasconadian belong exclusively to the nautiloid order Ellesmerocerida, and predominantly to the Ellesmeroceratidae. Among these were Clarkoceras and Ectenolites which continued from the Late Cambrian, along with the exclusively Ordovician Ellesmeroceras the similar Eremoceras, both cylindrically orthoconic, and the compressed endogastric Dakeoceras. All have essentially straight, short septal necks and thick concave connecting rings in the siphuncle.

The latter Canadian, following the Gasconadian saw the onset and early diversification of two new orders, the Endocerida and Tarphycerida, evolution of new families within the Ellerocerida (e.g. Baltoceratidae and Bathmoceratidae), and near the end the first of the Orthocerida, Actinocerida, and Discosorida.

The limited suprageneric cephalopod diversity of the Gasconadian compared to the ordinal diversity that followed also suggests a relatively short duration for the stage.
