= Trempealeauan =

- 492.5 – 488.3 Ma

Usage information
- Celestial body: Earth
- Regional usage: Regional
- Time scale(s) used: North American

Definition
- Chronological unit: Age
- Stratigraphic unit: Stage

The Trempealeauan is the upper or latest stage of the Upper or Late Cambrian in North America, spanning about 4 million years from about 492.5 to 488.3 m.y.a., equivalent to the Fengshanian of China. The name comes from the Trempealeau Formation, named for the town of Trempealeau in western Wisconsin, located on the Mississippi River.

The Trempealeauan follows, or overlies, the Franconian, which is the middle stage of the Upper Cambrian in North America and is followed by the Gasconadian in the Lower Ordovician. Together with the Dresbachian at the bottom, the Trempealeauan and Franconian make up the Croixan Series.
