= Septum (cephalopod) =

Thin partitions in the shell of mollusks

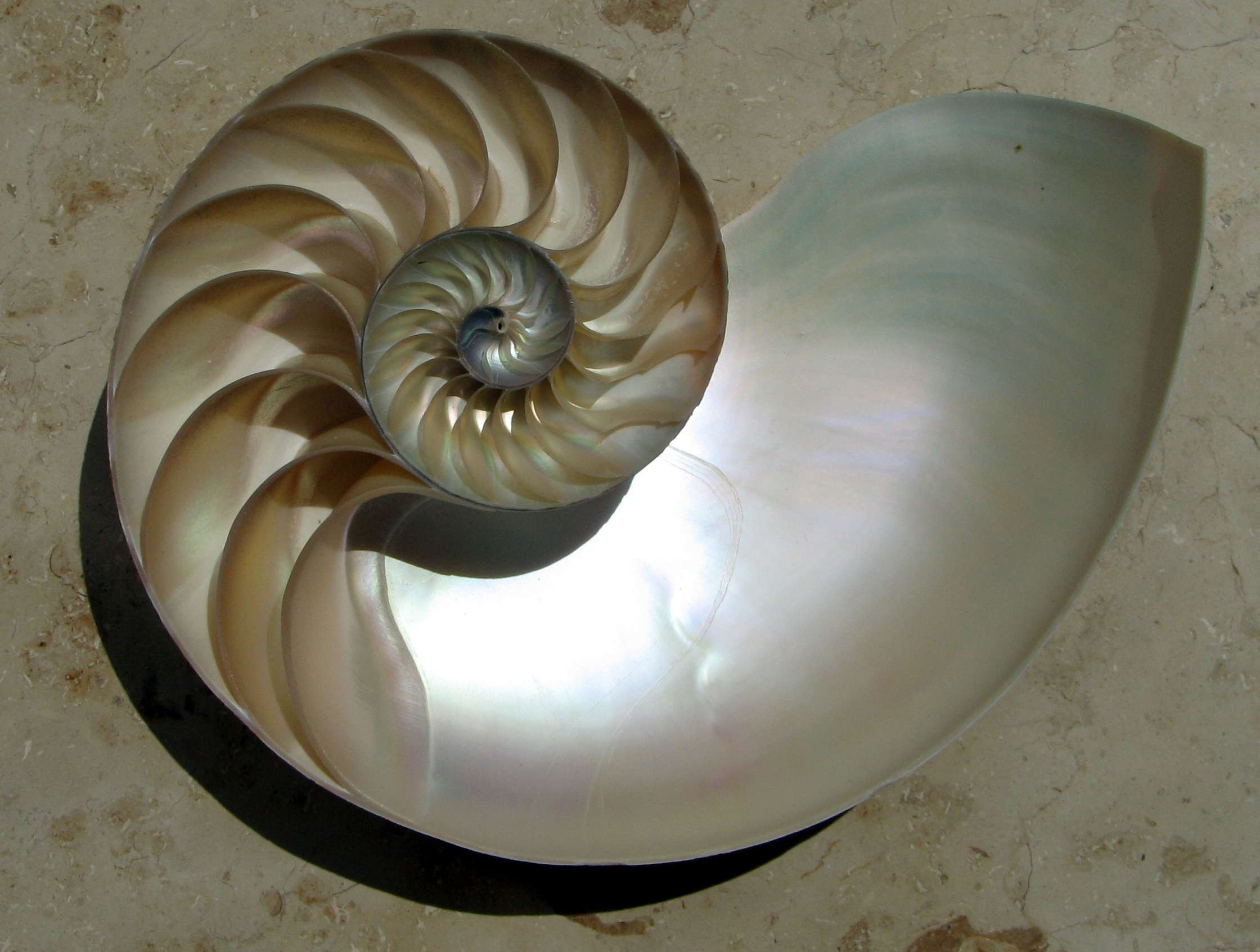
Cutaway of a nautilus shell showing the chambers

Septa (singular septum) are thin walls or partitions between the internal chambers (camerae) of the shell of a cephalopod, namely nautiloids or ammonoids.

As the creature grows, its body moves forward in the shell to a new living chamber, secreting septa behind it. This adds new chambers to the shell, which can be clearly seen in cross-sections of the shell of the living nautilus, or in ammonoid and nautiloid fossils. The septa are attached to the inside wall of the shell, thus dividing the phragmocone into camerae.

Where the septum meets the shell a suture line forms; in some ammonoids these lines became extremely complex and elaborate, providing strength without the necessity of added weight. Elaborate sutures allowed for thinner shells, and hence less time needed for shell growth and less time spent in the vulnerable juvenile stage.

The nature and structure of the septa, as with the camerae, and siphuncle, and the presence or absence of deposits, are important in classification of nautiloids. In some nautiloids, such as the Orthoceratidae, the septa tend to be widely spaced, resulting in large, long camerae. In others such as the Ellesmerocerida, Oncocerida and Discosorida the septa are crowded closely together. In some straight-shelled forms like Actinoceras, calcium carbonate deposits extend from the camera (mural deposits) to the septa (episeptal deposits).

It is possible to calculate the strength of cephalopod septa on the basis of their thickness and curvature, and from this the shell's implosion depth can be estimated. This has in turn been used to estimate maximum depth ranges for many living and extinct cephalopod groups, on the assumption that these animals would not normally venture deeper than two-thirds of their shell's implosion depth. Ordered by increasing depth, these estimated maximum depth ranges are: Discosorida (<100 m); Oncocerida and Tarphycerida (<150 m); Actinoceroidea (50–150 m); Ellesmerocerida (50–200 m); Belemnitida (50–200 m, exceptionally to 350 m); Bactritoidea (c. 400 m); Endoceroidea (100–450 m); Orthocerida (150–500 m); Nautilida (200–600 m); Aulacocerida (200–900 m); and Sepiida (200–1000 m).
