= Ellesmerocerida =

Ellesmerocerida Temporal range: Upper Cambrian–Sandbian
- Life positions of Ellesmerocerida

Scientific classification
- Kingdom: Animalia
- Phylum: Mollusca
- Class: Cephalopoda
- Subclass: Nautiloidea
- Superorder: †Plectronoceratoidea
- Order: †Ellesmerocerida; Flower, 1950

Subgroups
- See text.

Extinct order of nautiloids

The Ellesmerocerida is an extinct order of primitive cephalopods belonging to the subclass Nautiloidea with a widespread distribution that lived during the Late Cambrian and Ordovician.

== Morphology ==
The Ellesmerocerida are characterized by shells that are typically small, some even tiny, with close-spaced septa and relatively large ventral siphuncles. In some genera (e.g. Paleoceras), the septa are uniformly spaced. Shells of ellesmerocerids are typically smooth and compressed and vary in form. They may be breviconic (short) or longiconic (elongate), straight (orthoconic) or curved (cyrtoconic). Cyrtoconic forms are usually endogastric, with longitudinally convex ventral margins. The apices of straight forms typically have an endogastric curvature. Some may have grown to as much as 15 cm.

Siphuncle segments are tubular or concave. Septal necks are short. Connecting rings which may appear layered are thick and typically wedge shaped with their maximum width at or near where they join the previous septum. The siphuncle interior is commonly crossed by irregular partitions, known as diaphragms, but are otherwise free of internal deposits

As soft parts are not prone to fossilization, little can be surmised as to their soft part anatomy. Preserved muscle attachment scars indicate that they may have had segmented muscles reminiscent of primitive monoplacophoran molluscs. As for arms or tentacles, little can be said except that eight or ten, retained in modern coleoids, seems to be Plesiomorphic in origin.

== Taxonomy ==
Rousseau Flower defined the Ellesmerocerida as containing all archaic, ancestral cephalopods and established three suborders within: the Plectronoceratina, Ellesmeroceratina, and Cyrtocerinina. Furnish and Glenister, in the Treatise on Invertebrate Paleontology, Part K, essentially followed suit with minor differences at the family level. Mary Wade (1988) included the Ellesmerocerida in the superorder Plectonoceratoidea, which she defined as containing the Plectronocerida, Ellesmerocerida and two orders introduced by Chen and Teichert in 1983, the Cambrian Yanhecerida and Protactinocerida. The Plectronocerida, also Cambrian, includes forms once included in the suborder Plectronoceratina, now elevated in rank.

The Ellesmerocerida have been revised to include only primitive nautiloid cephalopods with thick connecting rings and siphuncle segments that are concave in outline. Accordingly, the order includes the Ellesmeroceratidae, Protocycloceratidae, Cyclostomiceratidae, Bassleroceratidae, Eothinoceratidae, Bathmoceratidae, and Cyrtocerinidae. The Ellesmeroceratidae, Protocycloceratidae, Cyclostomiceratidae, Bassleroceratidae are found in Flower's basic Ellesmeroceratina. The Eothinoceratidae, Bathmoceratidae, and Cyrtocerinidae are combined in the Cyrtocerinina. The Schideleroceratidae, Apocrinoceratidae, Baltoceratidae and certain members of the Protocycloceratidae, all which have thin tubular or expanded siphuncles, are now excluded. The Apocrinoceratidae, once included, is now assigned to the Discosorida

== Evolution and phylogeny ==
The Ellesmerocerida are derived from the Plectronocerida, having first appeared early in the Trempealeauan Stage of the Late Cambrian and quickly diversifying into four families, only one of which, the Ellesmeroceratidae, continued by means of the genera Ectenolites and Clarkoceras into the Gasconadian in the Lower Ordovician. The other three, Acaroceratidae, Huaiheceratidae, and Xiaoshanoceratidae having perished in the extinction event that occurred late in the Trempealeauan, before the end of the Cambrian.

The dominant family of Ordovician Ellesmerocerida is the Ellesmeroceriatidae which are distinguished from the generally similar Protocycloceratidae by the presence of broad lateral lobes in the suture. Sutures in the Protocycloceratidae are straight and transverse. Both contain forms that are annulate (transversally ribbed) as well as smooth. Other Ordovician families are the broad and breviconic Cyclostomiceratidae and exogastric Bassleroceratidae, rounding out the Ellesmeroceratina. Three families, the Bathmoceratidae, Cyrtocerinidae, and Eothinoceratidae differ from the others in that their connecting rings are greatly thickened inwardly as annular lobes. The Ellesmerocerida gave rise to the Endocerida through Pachendoceras and to the Tarphycerida and Oncocerida through Bassleroceras and is the source for the Orthocerida, Pseudorthocerida, Actinocerida, and Discosorida.

The Ellesmerocerida mostly died out by the end of the early Ordovician (Arenigian), although some stragglers survived until the end of the Ordovician.
