= Siphuncle =

Strand of tissue passing longitudinally through the shell of a cephalopod mollusc

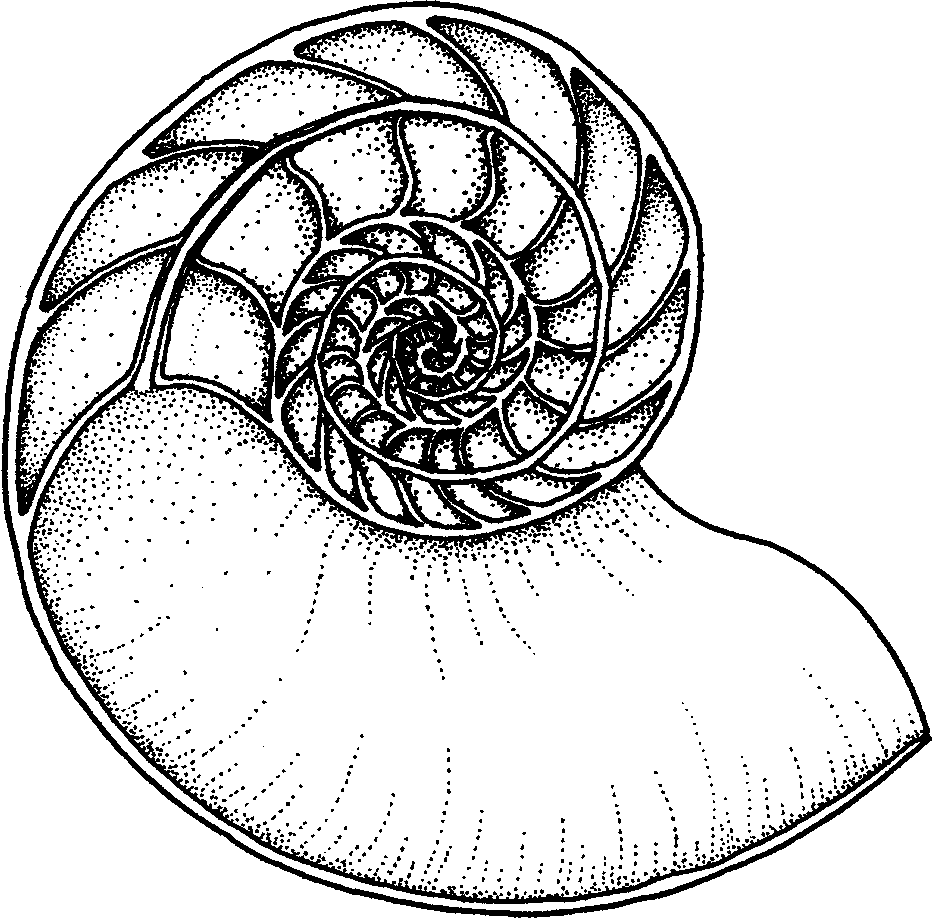
A cross-section through a Nautilus shell, showing a narrow siphuncle connecting the chambers of the shell

The siphuncle is a strand of tissue passing longitudinally through the shell of a cephalopod mollusc. Only cephalopods with chambered shells have siphuncles, such as the extinct ammonites and belemnites, and the living nautiluses, cuttlefish, and Spirula. In the case of the cuttlefish, the siphuncle is indistinct and connects all the small chambers of that animal's highly modified shell; in the other cephalopods it is thread-like and passes through small openings in the septa (walls) dividing the camerae (chambers). Some older studies have used the term siphon for the siphuncle, though this naming convention is uncommon in modern studies to prevent confusion with a mollusc organ of the same name.

== Function ==
Simplified structure and mechanism of cephalopodic siphuncle.

The siphuncle is used primarily in emptying water from new chambers as the shell grows. To perform this task, the cephalopod increases the saltiness of the blood in the siphuncle, and the water moves from the more dilute chamber into the blood through osmosis. At the same time gasses, mostly nitrogen, oxygen, and carbon dioxide, diffuse from the blood in the siphuncle into the emptying chamber. This is not a form of active pumping: the gas moving into the chamber is a passive process. Most energy is expended through the absorption of water from the chamber.

Removing water from the chambers of the shell reduces the overall density of the shell, and thus the shell behaves as a flotation device comparable to the swim bladder in bony fish. Typically, cephalopods maintain a density close to that of sea water, allowing them to keep a stable buoyancy with minimal effort. In the geologic past, many cephalopods grew to an enormous size (perhaps approaching ten meters in length) thanks to this.

Generally, the siphuncle is unable to provide a way to change the density of shell rapidly and thus cause the animal to rise or sink at will; rather, the animal must swim up or down as required.

Cephalopods with a wider siphuncle have a higher rate of metabolic activity.

== Morphology ==
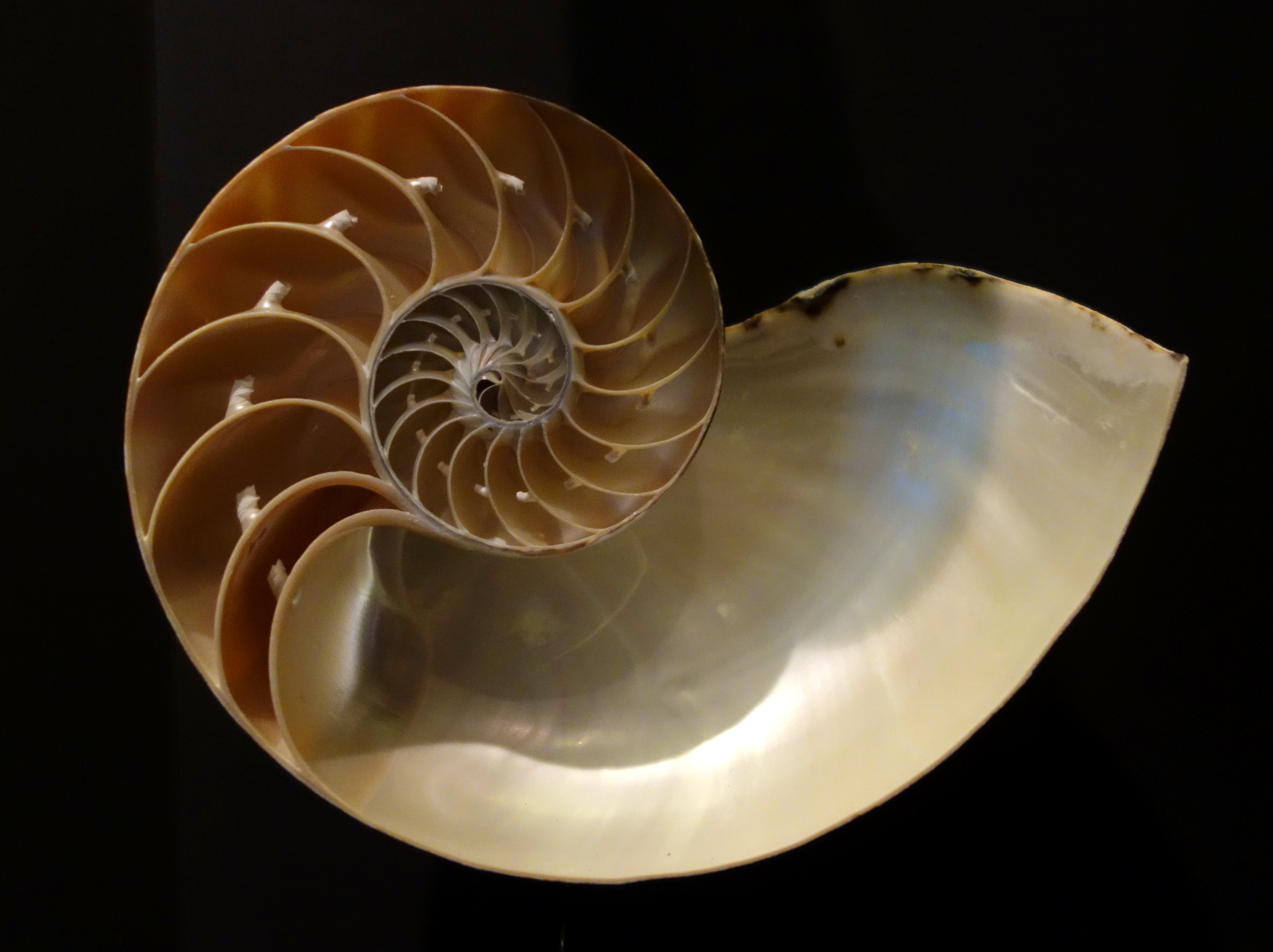
A shell of Nautilus pompilius in cross section. Septal necks are preserved, but the thin connecting rings have been degraded and lost.

The siphuncle of fossilised cephalopods is assumed to have worked in the same general way as in living nautiluses. The siphuncle itself is only rarely preserved, but its shape can be inferred from hardened structures which lie around it. Many fossils show the holes where the siphuncle passes through each septum. Around these holes, the rim of the septum is bent into a stout aragonitic tube known as a septal neck (or siphuncle notch).

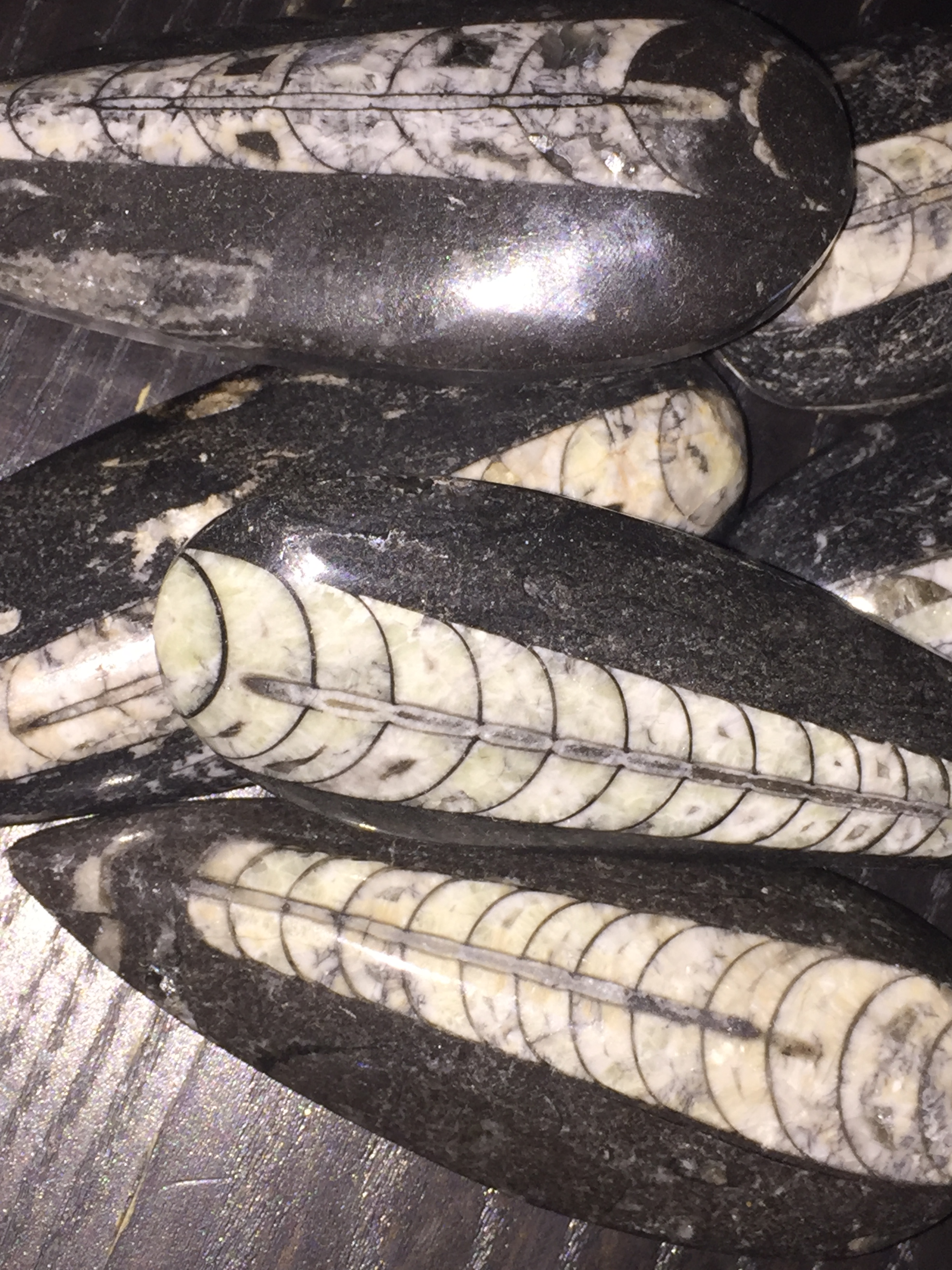
These polished orthocerid nautiloid cephalopod fossils from Morocco have fully preserved septal necks and connecting rings outlining the shape of the siphuncle.

In each chamber of the shell, the siphuncle is encased by a tubular structure known as a connecting ring. In living nautiluses, the connecting ring is a simple, thin-walled cylinder, with organic or thinly calcitic layers secreted from the tissues of the siphuncle. This fragile and poorly-mineralized form is known as a nautilosiphonate morphology. Many extinct cephalopods have a much more prominent connecting ring, with a very thick and porous inner calcitic layer. This more strongly-mineralized form is known as a calciosiphonate connecting ring. Connecting rings are strongly variable in morphology, from narrow homogenous tubes to bulbous, segmented cavities. Some are infolded, sending lobes or blades of calcite into the siphuncle. Connecting rings are typically continuous with the septal necks, and are difficult to distinguish without close examination. However, their developmental origin is wholly separate from the shell and septa, and they utilize calcite rather than aragonite as a biomineralized reinforcement.

Biomineralized structures which develop within the siphuncle are known as endosiphuncular deposits (or simply siphonal deposits). These may include horizontal partitions (diaphragms), stacked conical structures (endocones), longitudinal rods, and various other concretions. Endosiphuncular deposits are typically thin structures which may be homologous to parts of the septae or connecting rings.

In most fossil nautiluses, the siphuncle runs more or less through the center of each chamber, but in ammonites and belemnites it usually runs along the ventral edge of the shell. In some fossil straight shelled nautiloids, cylindrical calcareous growths ("siphuncular deposits") around the siphuncle can be seen towards the apex of the shell. These were apparently counterweights for the soft body at the other end of the shell, and allowed the nautilus to swim in a horizontal position. Without these deposits, the apex of the buoyant shell would have pointed upwards and the heavier body downwards, making horizontal swimming difficult. The siphuncle of the Endocerida also contained much of the organisms' body organs.

== See also ==
- Phragmocone
- Orthoceras
- Orthocerida
- Orthoceratoidea
- Baculites
