= Rhynchorthoceras =

Rhynchorthoceras Temporal range: MOrdovician

Scientific classification
- Kingdom: Animalia
- Phylum: Mollusca
- Class: Cephalopoda
- Subclass: Nautiloidea
- Order: †Tarphycerida
- Family: †Lituitidae
- Genus: †Rhynchorthoceras

Genus of nautiloids

Rhynchorthoceras is a Middle Ordovician genus characterized by a rapidly expanded, weakly annulate orthocone, like the orthoconic section of Ancistroceras, but with only a curved, cyrtoconic apex instead of juvenile whorls.

Rhynchorthoceras is probably derived from Ancistroceras by a loss of the tarphycerid type apex, although it has been included with the orthocerid Sinoceratidae.
