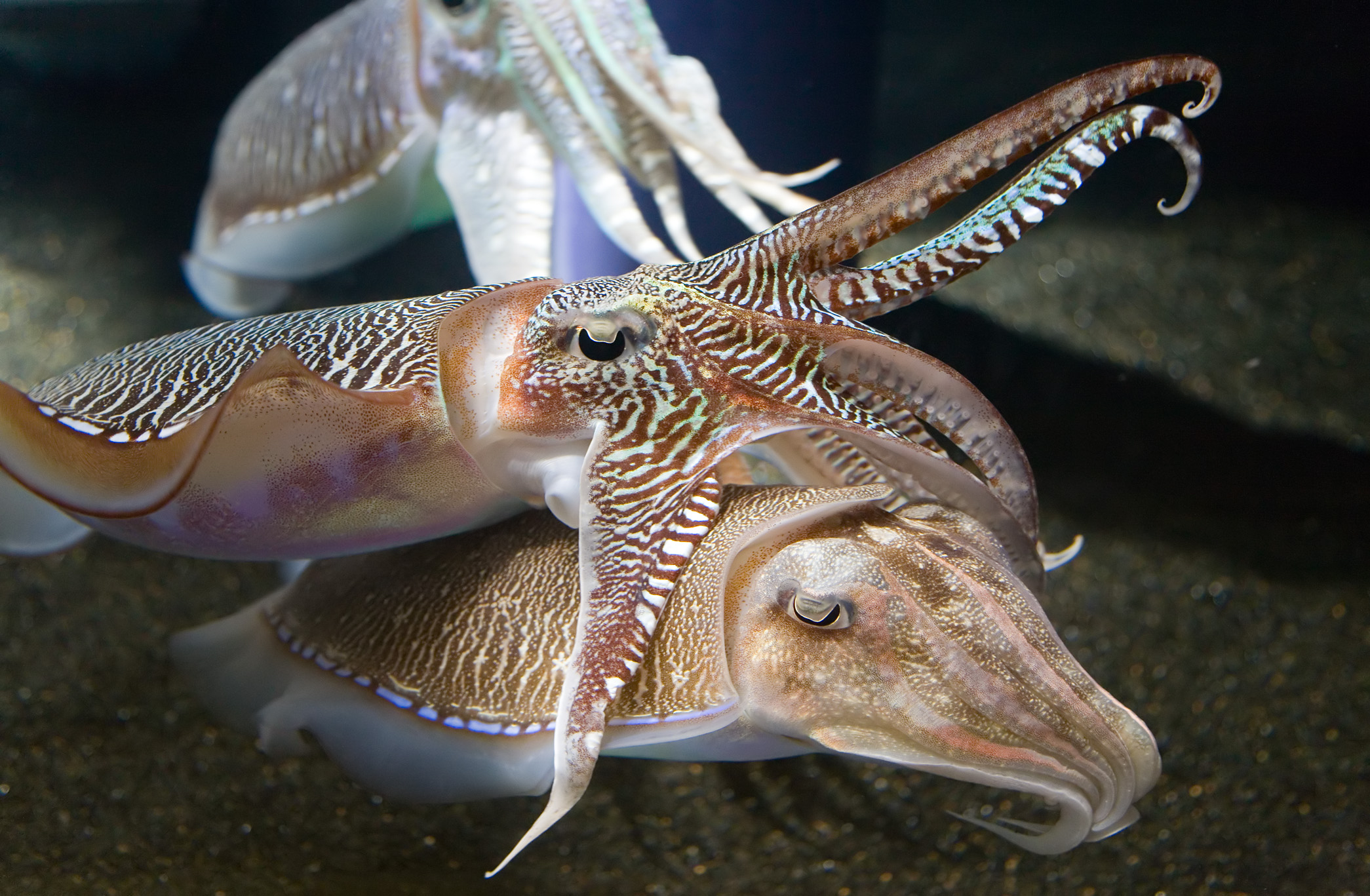

Scientific classification
- Domain: Eukaryota
- Kingdom: Animalia
- Phylum: Mollusca
- Class: Cephalopoda
- Clade: Neocephalopoda; Lehmann & Hillmer, 1980

Subgroups
- Order Orthocerida (in part)†; Order Lituitida†; Order Bactritida†; Subclass Ammonoidea†; Subclass Coleoidea; Belemnoidea†; Neocoleoidea

Synonyms
- Angusteradulata Lehmann, 1967

= Neocephalopoda =

Neocephalopods Temporal range: Lower Ordovician–recent

Clade of molluscs

Neocephalopods are a group of cephalopod mollusks that include the coleoids and all extinct species that are more closely related to extant coleoids than to the nautilus. In cladistic terms, it is the total group of Coleoidea. In contrast, the palcephalopoda are defined as the sister group to the neocephalopoda.

== Taxonomic history ==
The name Neocephalopoda was first published (in Lehmann & Hillmer, 1980) as an Infraclass, which (in a reversal of the usual Linnean hierarchy) included the Subclasses Bactritoidea, Ammonoidea, and Coleoidea. Neocephalopoda was a new name for a group that had been recognized previously and called Angusteradulata (Lehmann, 1967), based on a discovery of an ammonoid radula similar to modern coleoids. It was contrasted with the Lateradulata, which included the nautilus and most fossil nautiloids.

These names were applied by later workers running cladistic analyses on the cephalopods. Berthold & Engeser (1987) adopted the name Angusteradulata for the clade comprising ammonoids and coleoids. Later, Engeser (1996) included not only the coleoids, ammonoids, and bactritids, but also some orthocerid families: Michelinoceratidae, Sphaerorthoceratidae, Arionoceratidae, "and probably other groups as well."

Although the name Angusteradulata appeared earlier than Neocephalopoda, both names were coined by Lehmann, who preferred the latter. Engeser and Lehmann later both agreed that Neocephalopoda was a more suitable name than Angusteraduata.

== Features of the neocephalopods ==
The following characters are thought to be shared, at least ancestrally, by neocephalopods. Most are from Engeser (1996) or from his Fossil Nautiloidea page.

- The embryonic shell is small (about 1.5 to 3 mm), somewhat spherical, and separated from the rest of the shell by a constriction. This may reflect an r-selected strategy of producing a large number of small offspring, as seen in most modern coleoids, rather than the K-selected strategy of the nautilus.
- The protoconch, or initial chamber, lacks a cicatrix, a scar left by the original organic plate during the embryonic development of the nautilus and its fossil relatives.
- The radula is more similar to coleoids, with 9 elements per row, than to the nautilus, with 13 elements per row. Ammonoids have been found with coleoid-like radulas, as have orthoconic nautiloids dating back to the Ordovician Period (Gabbott, 1999).

== Classification ==
Although there is wide agreement that bactritids included the ancestors of ammonoids and coleoids, and hence that all three groups belong in one clade, the relations among some neocephalopods remain problematic. The greatest obstacles may lie among the nautiloids:

- The classification of orthocerids is still jumbled and requires revision based on features of the embryonic shell.
- Since cephalopod fossils from the Cambrian and Early Ordovician Periods are rare and usually incomplete, we do not know the ancestral states of many characters, making it difficult to assess which derived characters unite the neocephalopods and which other nautiloid groups belong among them.

Nevertheless, recent descriptions of shells with preserved apical ends have aided in the classification of major taxa. For instance, ascocerids and pseudorthocerids have a cicatrix and so do not belong among the neocephalopods. Conversely, true orthocerids and lituitids lack a cicatrix and have a round protoconch, which suggest neocephalopod affinities.

In contrast, some workers have suggested that crown cephalopods did not evolve until approximately the Silurian Period. If that is correct, then all early Paleozoic cephalopods must be stem cephalopods and not neocephalopods.
