= Hemicosmorthoceras =

Hemicosmorthoceras Temporal range: Ordovician-Devonian

Scientific classification
- Kingdom: Animalia
- Phylum: Mollusca
- Class: Cephalopoda
- Order: †Orthocerida
- Family: †Sphaerorthoceratidae
- Genus: †Hemicosmorthoceras; Foerste (1925)

Genus of molluscs

Hemicosmorthoceras is an extinct genus of actively mobile carnivorous cephalopod, essentially a nautiloid, that lived in what would be present day Europe during the Silurian to Devonian from 422.9—412.3 mya, existing for approximately 10.6 million years.

== Taxonomy ==
Hemicosmorthoceras was named by Foerste (1925). It was assigned to Orthocerida by Teichert et al. (1964); and to Endocerida by Sepkoski (2002).

== Morphology ==
The shell is usually long and may be straight ("orthoconic") or gently curved. In life, these animals may have been similar to the modern squid, except for the long shell.

== Fossil distribution ==
Fossil distribution is exclusive to Sardinia, Austrian Alps.
