= Parasphaerorthoceras =

Parasphaerorthoceras Temporal range: Gorstian - Lochkovian

Scientific classification
- Kingdom: Animalia
- Phylum: Mollusca
- Class: Cephalopoda
- Order: †Orthocerida
- Family: †Sphaerorthoceratidae
- Genus: †Parasphaerorthoceras; Ristedt 1968

Species
- See text

Extinct genus of nautiloids

Parasphaerorthoceras is an extinct orthocerid genus, a nautiloid cephalopod, that lived in what would be Europe and north Africa during the Silurian from 422.9 to 418.1 mya, having existed for approximately 4.8 million years.

== Taxonomy ==
Parasphaerorthoceras was named by Ristedt in 1968, who placed it in the Sphaerorthoceratidae, which he also named. Parasphaerorthoceras is listed in Jack Sepkoski's (2002) list of Cephalopod genera under Orthocerida It is also classified and described in some detail in Björn Kröger's 2008 paper on Silurian and Devonian nautiloids from Morocco

== Morphology ==
The shell of Parasphaerorthoceras is generally straight, ("orthoconic") with a circular cross section. The initial chamber is spheroidal, followed by a distinct constriction. The apical part of the shell is wavy but becomes striated, then smooth in later growth stages. The siphuncle is central or subcentral. Septal necks suborthochoanitic. Sutures are straight.

In life, these animals may have been similar to the modern squid, except for the long shell.

== Fossil distribution ==
Parasphaerothoceras species have been found in Austria, Italy, Sardinia, and Morocco.
