= Angelinoceras =

Angelinoceras Temporal range: M Ordovician

Scientific classification
- Kingdom: Animalia
- Phylum: Mollusca
- Class: Cephalopoda
- Subclass: Nautiloidea
- Order: †Tarphycerida
- Family: †Lituitidae
- Genus: †Angelinoceras; Hyatt, 1894

Extinct genus of molluscs

Angelinoceras is a genus of lituitids from the Middle Ordovician that starts off with an open spiral of about 1.5 strongly compressed whorls followed by a straight orthoconic section that continues to expand for a length about equal to the diameter of the coiled portion before retaining a more or less consistent diameter. The juvenile spiral portion has a deep indentation on the ventral side of the aperture for the water-jet funnel, known as a hyponomic sinus, that becomes broad and shallow in the straight-shelled adult portion.

Angelinoceras is most likely derived from Holmiceras by a further opening of the initial spiral and a reduction in the expansion of the orthocone.
