= Bactroceras =

Bactroceras Temporal range: middle Ordovician

Scientific classification
- Kingdom: Animalia
- Phylum: Mollusca
- Class: Cephalopoda
- Order: †Riocerida
- Family: †Bactroceratidae; King & Evans, 2019
- Genus: †Bactroceras; Holm, 1898

Synonyms
- Eobactrites Schindewolf, 1932

Extinct genus of nautiloids

Bactroceras is a genus of orthoceratoid cephalopods that lived during the early Middle Ordovician, from about 472—464 mya, existing for approximately 8 million years.

== Taxonomy ==
Bactroceras was named by Holm (1898). Its type is Bactroceras avus. It was assigned to the order Orthocerida and family Baltoceratidae by Furnish and Glenister (1964) and retained there by Evans (2005). King & Evans (2019) instead placed it in its own family (Bactroceratidae), as part of the newly named order Rioceratida.

Some paleontologists have regarded Bactroceras as an early bactritid because of its spherical apex and ventral siphuncle.

However, a more recent study has argued that the shell of Bactroceras has important differences from those of true bactritids. For instance, the first shell chamber of Bactroceras resembles that of other Ordovician orthocerids, such as Archigeisonoceras and Hedstroemoceras: it is about 10 mm in diameter and is short, forming a spherical cap. True bactritids more strongly resemble late Silurian and Devonian orthocerids, whose first chamber is only about 5 mm across. Moreover, there is a large stratigraphic gap of nearly 50 million years between Bactroceras and the next orthocones with a spherical apex and ventral siphuncle.

== Morphology ==
Bactroceras had a thin, cone shaped shell. Its siphuncle, the tube connecting its chambers to the animal's body, was ventral, which means that it ran next to the shell wall on the underside of the shell. The first chamber of the shell was spherical. The soft anatomy of the animal is unknown, but it lacked mineral deposits in its shell, so it may have floated with the point of its shell upward, but somewhat inclined. Bactroceras differs from the later cephalopod Bactrites in that its shell was more circular in cross section and has deeper V-shaped ventral lobes.

== Fossil distribution ==
Fossils were found in Middle Ordovician strata dating from the Whiterockian/Llanvirnian age. Locations were varied and stretched from New South Wales, Australia to El Puente, Bolivia to Antelope Valley, Nevada.
