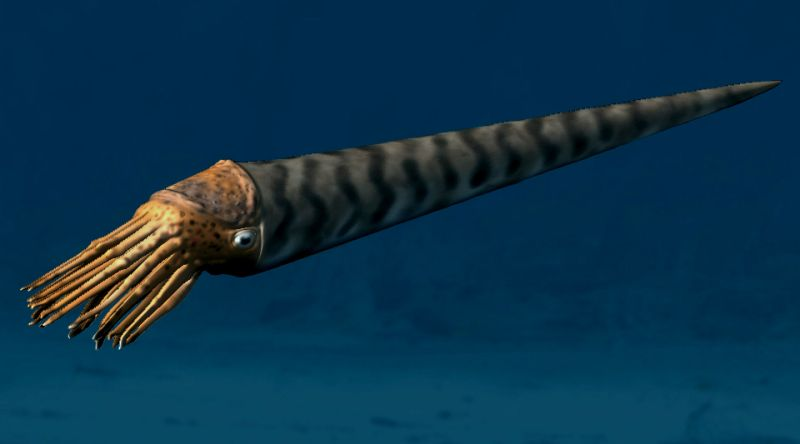
- Artist's reconstruction of O. regulare

Scientific classification
- Kingdom: Animalia
- Phylum: Mollusca
- Class: Cephalopoda
- Order: †Orthocerida
- Family: †Orthoceratidae
- Genus: †Orthoceras; Bruguière, 1789
- Species: †O. regulare

Binomial name
- †Orthoceras regulare (otheim, 1820)

= Orthoceras =

Orthoceras Temporal range: Middle Ordovician (Dapingian to Darriwilian), 470–458 Ma

Extinct genus of molluscs

Orthoceras, from Ancient Greek ὀρθός (orthós), meaning "straight", and κέρας (kéras), meaning "horn", is a genus of extinct nautiloid cephalopod restricted to Middle Ordovician-aged marine limestones of the Baltic States and Sweden. This genus is sometimes called Orthoceratites and misspelled as Orthocera, Orthocerus, or Orthoceros.

Orthoceras was formerly thought to have had a worldwide distribution due to the genus' use as a wastebasket taxon for numerous species of conical-shelled (orthocone) nautiloids throughout the Paleozoic and Triassic. Since this work was carried out and re-cataloging of the genus, Orthoceras sensu stricto refers to Orthoceras regulare, of Ordovician-aged Baltic Sea limestones of Sweden and neighboring areas.

An exemplary Orthoceras Fossil.

These are slender, elongate shells with the middle of the body chamber transversely constricted, and a subcentral orthochoanitic siphuncle. The surface is ornamented by a network of fine lirae. Many other very similar species are included under the genus Michelinoceras.

== History of the name ==
Originally Orthoceras referred to all nautiloids with a straight-shell, called an "orthocone". But later research on their internal structures, such as the siphuncle, cameral deposits, and others, showed that these actually belong to a number of groups, even different orders.

According to the authoritative Treatise on Invertebrate Paleontology, the name Orthoceras is now only used to refer to the type species O. regulare from the Middle Ordovician of Sweden, Russia, Ukraine, Belarus, Estonia and Lithuania. The genus might include a few related species.

== Confusion with Baculites ==
Orthoceras and related orthoconic nautiloid cephalopods are often confused with the superficially similar Baculites and related Cretaceous orthoconic ammonoids. Both are long and tubular in form, and both are common items for sale in rock shops (often under each other's names). Both lineages evidently evolved the tubular form independently of one another, and at different times in earth history. Orthoceras lived much earlier (Middle Ordovician) than Baculites (Late Cretaceous). The two types of fossils can be distinguished by many features, most obvious among which is the suture line: simple in Orthoceras (see image), intricately foliated in Baculites and related forms.

== See also ==
- Baculites – another type of extinct, straight-shelled cephalopod.
- Belemnite
- Hamites
- Lituites
