= Holmiceras =

Holmiceras Temporal range: late L Ordovician (Arenig)

Scientific classification
- Kingdom: Animalia
- Phylum: Mollusca
- Class: Cephalopoda
- Subclass: Nautiloidea
- Order: †Tarphycerida
- Family: †Lituitidae
- Genus: †Holmiceras; Hyatt, 1894

Genus of cephalopods

Holmiceras is one of two ancestral lituitids from the late Early Ordovician (Arenigian). The other being Ancistroceras.

Holmiceras begins with about 1.5 to 2 loosely coiled whorls followed by a rapidly expanding orthocone, much like Ancistroceras except for the apical whorls and that Holmiceras is known only from the late Early Ordovician whereas Ancestroceras extends through the middle of the period.

Holmiceras may have given rise to Angelinoceras which begins with an expanding open spiral.

== See also ==
- List of nautiloids
