= Riocerida =

Riocerida Temporal range: Tremadocian–Katian

Scientific classification
- Domain: Eukaryota
- Kingdom: Animalia
- Phylum: Mollusca
- Class: Cephalopoda
- Subclass: †Orthoceratoidea
- Order: †Riocerida; King & Evans, 2019

Families
- Bactroceratidae; Rioceratidae

Extinct order of nautiloids

Riocerida, originally named as Rioceratida, is an extinct order of Ordovician nautiloid cephalopods. They were the earliest-diverging members of the major group Orthoceratoidea, with which they share dorsomyarian muscle scars (a few large muscle scars concentrated at the top of the body chamber). However, they also possess several plesiomorphic ("primitive") traits which are absent in other orthoceratoids: Cameral and endosiphuncular deposits are absent, and the siphuncle has a marginal position along the lower edge of the shell. The conch (external shell) shape is slender, usually orthoconic (straight) or weakly cyrtoconic (slightly curved). The monophyly of Riocerida as a unique group is plausible but difficult to confirm, and they may instead be a paraphyletic grade or polyphyletic assemblage ancestral to all later orthoceratoids.
