= Sphaerorthoceratidae =

Sphaerorthoceratidae Temporal range: Sheinwoodian - Early Famennian

Scientific classification
- Kingdom: Animalia
- Phylum: Mollusca
- Class: Cephalopoda
- Order: †Orthocerida
- Family: †Sphaerorthoceratidae; Ristedt, 1968

Genera
- Akrosphaerorthoceras; Hemicosmorthoceras; Parasphaerorthoceras; Plagiostomoceras; Sphaerorthoceras

Extinct family of cephalopod molluscs

Sphaeorthoceratidae is an extinct family of orthocone cephalopods that lived in the Paleozoic Era. They were similar to the nautiloid Michelinoceras in the apex, but had shorter necks to their septa that were orthochoanitic or suborthochoanitic.

The sphaerorthoceratids were significant in cephalopod evolution because they may have given rise to the bactritids, which in turn were the ancestors of ammonoids and coleoids. The family lived in the middle Paleozoic, ranging from the Sheinwoodian age of the Silurian Period to the Famennian age of the Devonian Period, or about 428 to 361 Ma.
