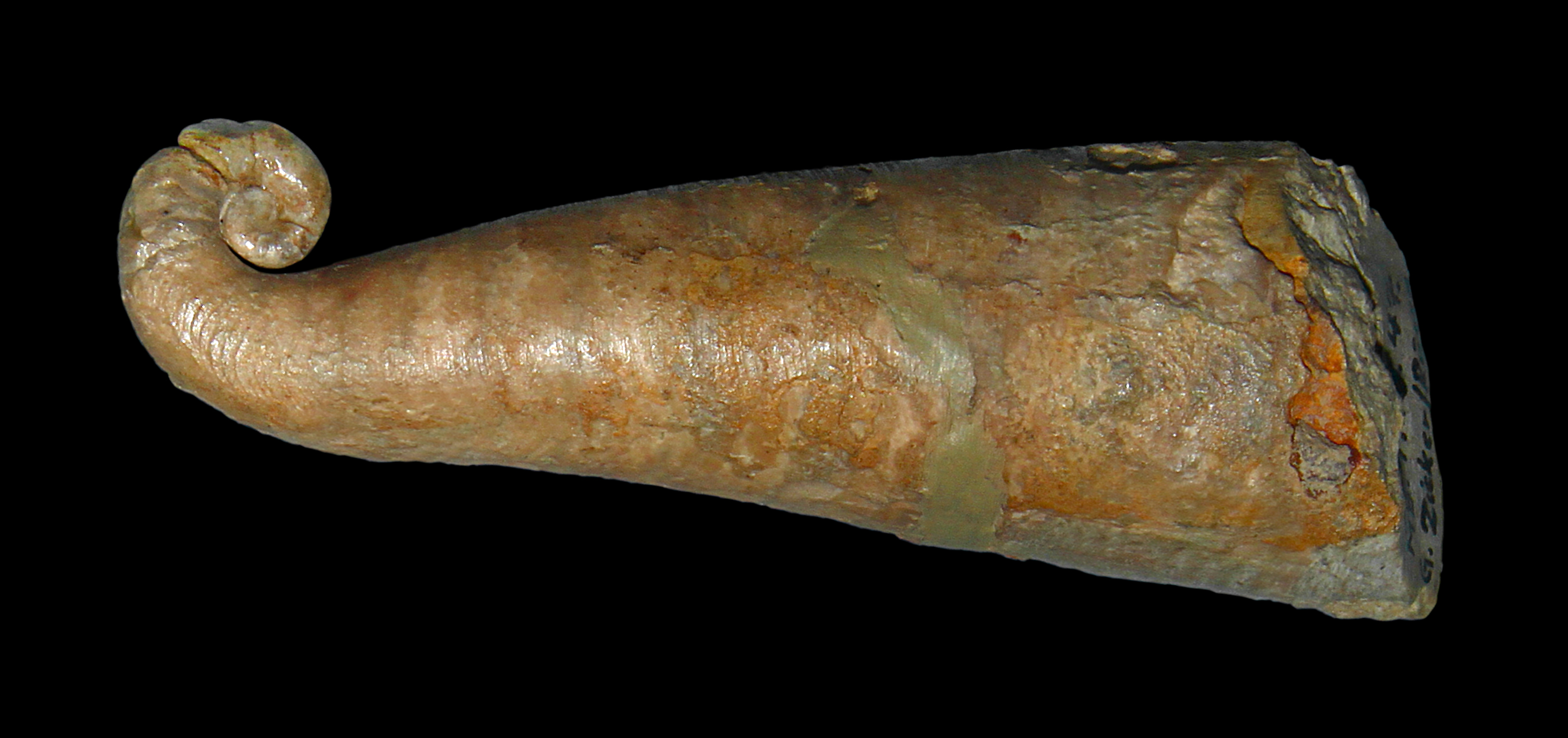

Scientific classification
- Domain: Eukaryota
- Kingdom: Animalia
- Phylum: Mollusca
- Class: Cephalopoda
- Subclass: Nautiloidea
- Order: †Tarphycerida
- Family: †Lituitidae
- Genus: †Ancistroceras; Remele, 1881

= Ancistroceras =

Ancistroceras Temporal range: late L Ord - M Ord.

Ancistroceras is one of the two ancestral lituitids from the late Early Ordovician (Arenigian). The other being Holmiceras.

The shell is weakly annulate, starts off with 1.5 to 2 contiguous or slightly separated whorls followed by a rapidly expanding orthocone with an apical angle of about 30 deg. Growth lines are sinuous, show a pronounced hyponomic sinus in the coiled juvenile portion at the apex but almost none at the mature aperture of the orthcone. Holmiceras is similar except that its whorls are more loosely coiled and it is known only from the Arenigian whereas Ancistroceras ranges through most of the Middle Ordovician.

Ancistroceras may have given rise to Rhynchorthoceras by a loss of the juvenile coiled portion, replacing it with a short semi-tubular cyrtoconic section. Ancistroceras may also have given rise to Lituites by evolving a narrower, less rapidly expanding, orthocone along with greater ornament and a complex aperture.
