= Sinoceratidae =

Sinoceratidae Temporal range: L Ordovician - U Triassic

Scientific classification
- Kingdom: Animalia
- Phylum: Mollusca
- Class: Cephalopoda
- Order: †Orthocerida
- Family: †Sinoceratidae; Shimizu and Obata, 1935

Family of orthoceroids

The Sinoceratidae is a family of orthoceroids, named for the genus Sinoceras, both by Shimizu and Obata 1935, and equivalent to the Michelinoceratinae Flower, 1945.

The Sinoceratidae are characterized by relatively long septal necks in the siphuncle, reaching as much as halfway between septa in the chambers; sparse cameral deposits and apparently none within the siphuncle.

The inclusion of the Sinoceratidae in some classifications in the Lituitida instead of the Orthocerida is based in part on the idea that the Lituitidae are included in the Orthocerida rather than as originally perceived in the Tarphycerida.
