= Lituites =

Lituites Temporal range: Mid Ordovician
- Fossil of Lituites lituus

Scientific classification
- Kingdom: Animalia
- Phylum: Mollusca
- Class: Cephalopoda
- Subclass: Nautiloidea
- Order: †Tarphycerida
- Family: †Lituitidae
- Genus: †Lituites

Species
- L. breynius; L. angulatus; L. convolvans; L. evolutus; L. lituus; L. undatus; L. perfectus

Extinct genus of nautiloids

Lituites is an extinct nautiloid genus from the Middle Ordovician and type for the Lituitidae (a tarphycerid family) that in some more recent taxonomies has been classified with the orthocerids and listed under the order Lituitida. Fossils have been found in New York, Argentina, Norway, Sweden, Estonia, and China.

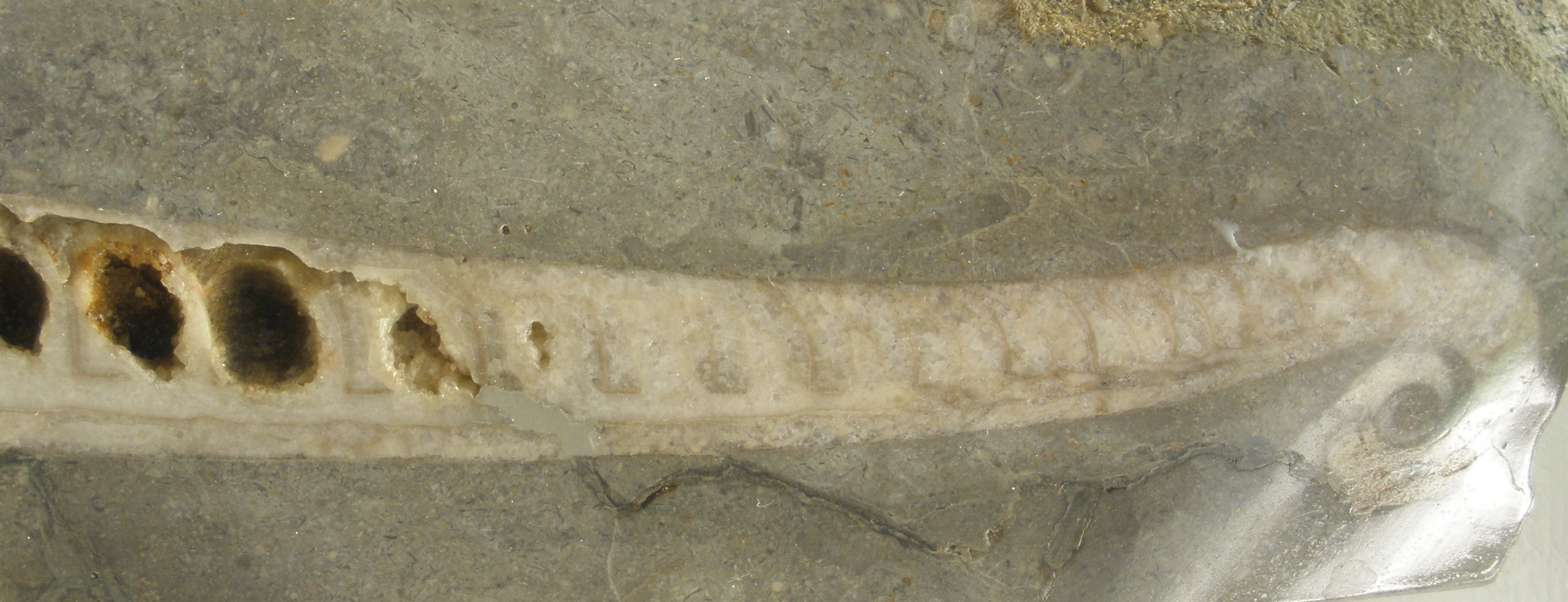
Lituites lituus

Lituites produced a shell with a planospirally coiled juvenile portion at the apex, reflective of its tarphycerid ancestry, followed by a long, moderately expanding, generally straight, orthoconic adult section with a subdorsal siphuncle connecting the chambers. The adult body chamber may equal or exceed the length of the chambered part of the orthoconic section. The mature aperture has a pair of pronounced ventrolateral lappets and a similar but shorter pair of dorsolateral lappets.

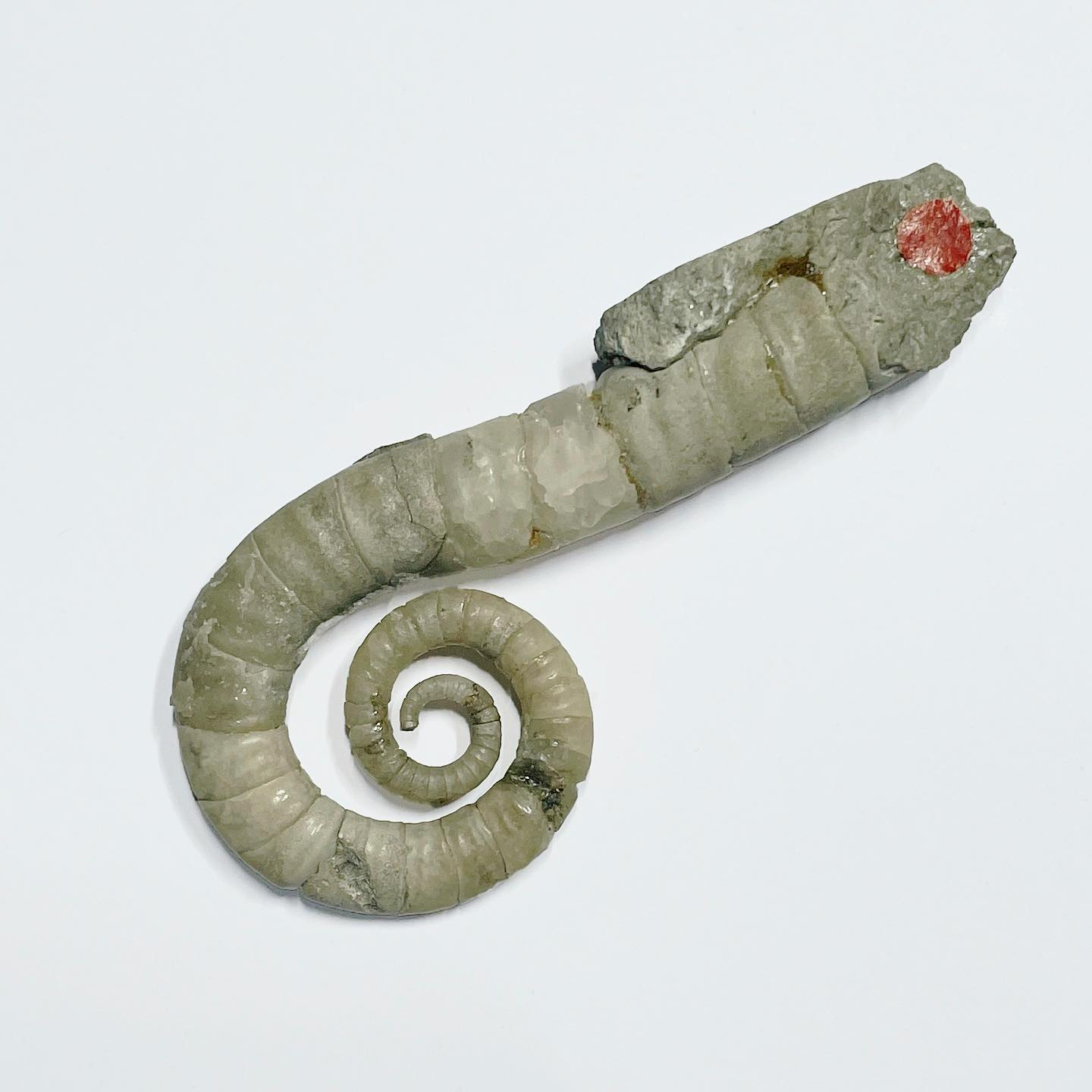
Lituites perfectus, Ordovician, Niederfinow Germany, Museum fuer Naturkunde Berlin

Lituites gives its name to the term "lituiticone" which refers to a shell that is coiled in the early growth stage and later becomes uncoiled. They were killed out in the late Ordovician period. Their slow movement and large bodies made them an easy target.
