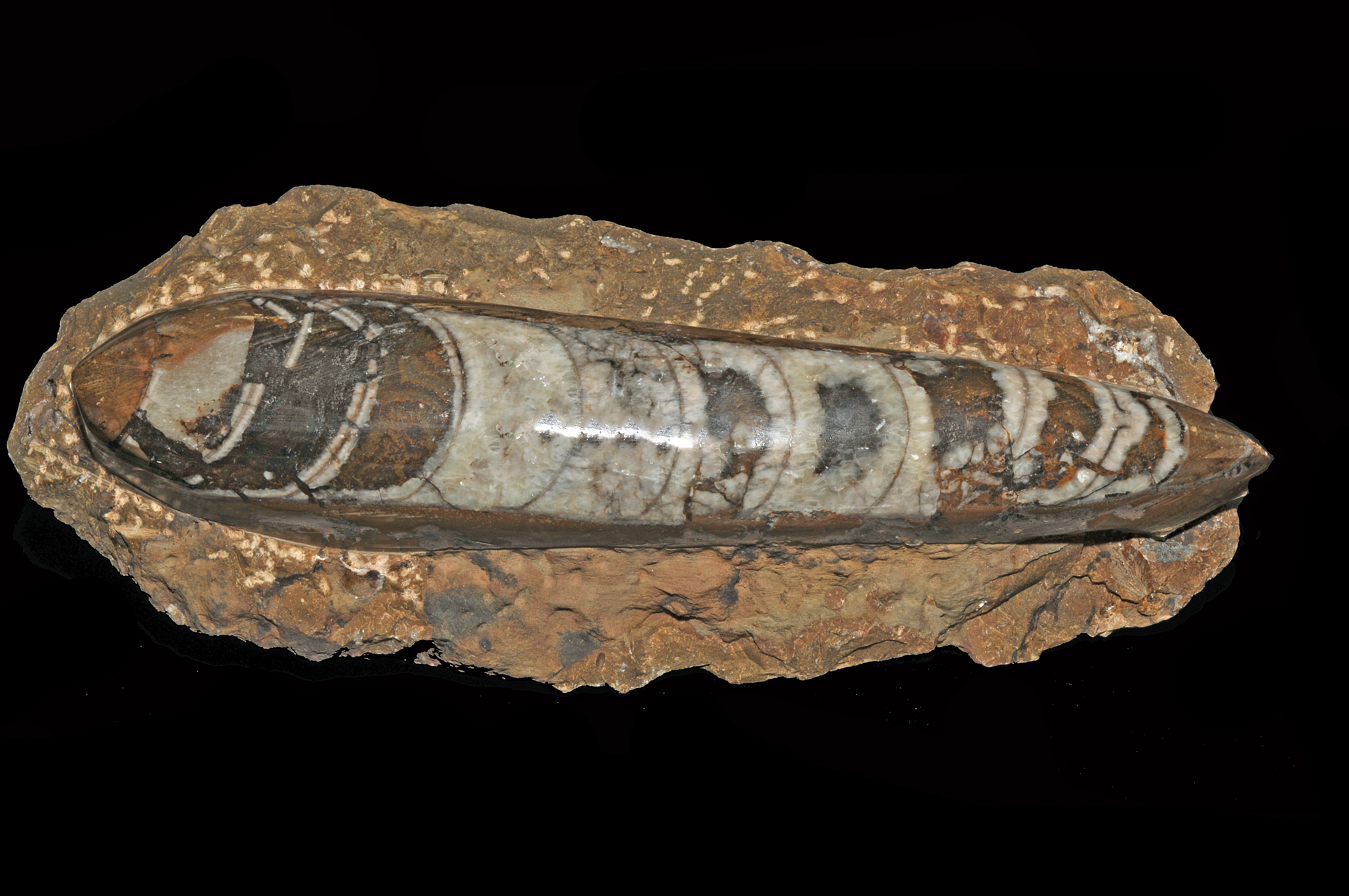
- Orthoconic nautiloid fossil from Morocco

Scientific classification
- Domain: Eukaryota
- Kingdom: Animalia
- Phylum: Mollusca
- Class: Cephalopoda
- Subclass: †Orthoceratoidea; M'Coy 1844

Orders
- Riocerida (possibly paraphyletic); Dissidocerida (paraphyletic); Lituitida; Actinocerida; Pseudorthocerida; Orthocerida (paraphyletic)

= Orthoceratoidea =

Orthoceratoidea Temporal range: Lower Ordovician–Upper Triassic Descendant taxon Coleoidea survives to the present

Extinct subclass of cephalopods

Orthoceratoidea, from Ancient Greek ὀρθός (orthós), meaning "straight", and κέρας (kéras), meaning "horn", is a major subclass of nautiloid cephalopods. Members of this subclass usually have orthoconic (straight) to slightly cyrtoconic (curved) shells, and central to subcentral siphuncles which may bear internal deposits. Orthoceratoids are also characterized by dorsomyarian muscle scars (a small number of large scars concentrated at the top of the body chamber), extensive cameral deposits, and calciosiphonate connecting rings with a porous and calcitic inner layer.

Currently, Orthoceratoidea comprises the orders Riocerida, Dissidocerida, Actinocerida, Pseudorthocerida, Lituitida and Orthocerida. Orthocerida is a noteworthy paraphyletic order which is ancestral to the major cephalopod groups such as the extinct ammonoids and living coleoids (cephalopods without external shells, including squids, octopus, cuttlefish, etc.).

== Taxonomy ==
As a superorder, Orthoceratiodea was one of six superorders within the Nautiloidea, the others being the Plectronoceratoidea (= Ellesmeroceratoidea of some) from which the others are derived, the Endoceratoidea, Actinoceratoidea, Discosoratoidea, and Nautilitoidea.

Current classifications (e.g. Kröger 2008 and Teichert 1980) separate orthoceratoids, endocerids and actinocerids as co-equal taxa to the Nautiloidea, which becomes much reduced in scope. Wade (1988) instead proposed separating the Nautiloidea into phylogenetically related superorders while retaining the basic concept of the subclass: externally shelled cephalopods with simple concave septa and retrochoanitic siphuncles from which the convexly septate Ammonoidea with prochoanitic siphuncles are distinguished.

In Kröger 2008, Orthoceratoidea is used as a subclass, referring to McCoy (1844), revising his (Kröger 2004) perception of the order Orthocerida Kuhn (1940) as part of the Nautiloidea, in the sense of Sweet 1964 in the Treatise on Invertebrate Paleontology.

In the classification of Teichert (1988), the subclass Orthoceratoidea is expanded to include the orders found in the Plectronoceratoidea and Orthoceratoidea of Wade (1988), combining forms with thick-ringed ventral siphuncles with those with thin-ringed central siphuncles.

The Orthoceratoidea in Kröger (2008) includes the Orthocerida, Ascocerida, Pseudorthocerda as in Wade (1988) plus the Dissidocerida and Lituitida. The Lituitida, or Lituitiae, has been shown to have evolved from within the Tarphycerida by a straightening of the adult shell, a common character of many tarphycerids. The Dissidocerida, separated from the Orthocerida by Zhuravleva (1964), includes the Troedssonellidae and two small monogeneric orders, the Polymeridae and Rangeroceratidae, both established by Evans (2005).
