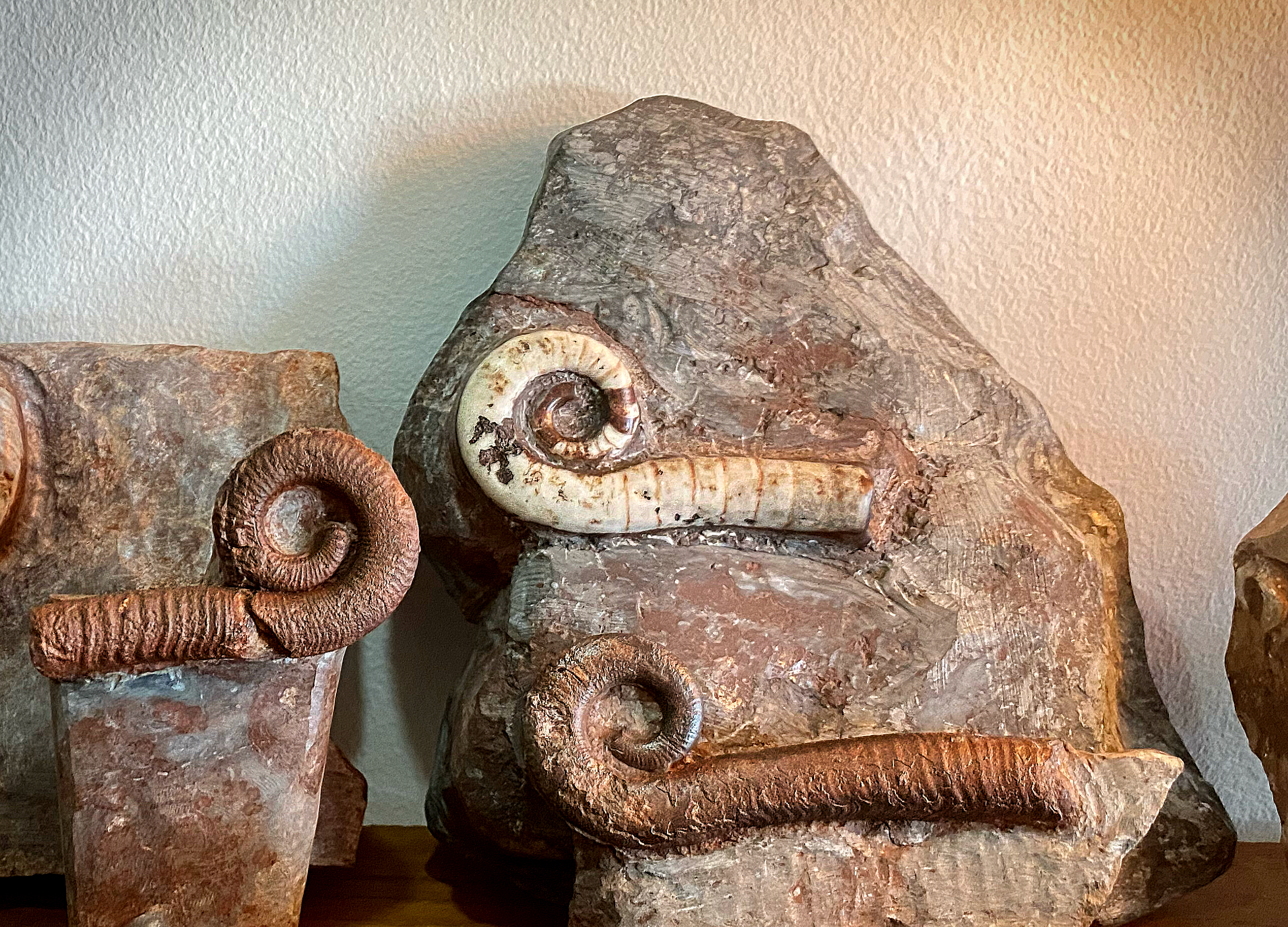

Scientific classification
- Kingdom: Animalia
- Phylum: Mollusca
- Class: Cephalopoda
- Subclass: Nautiloidea
- Order: †Tarphycerida
- Family: †Lituitidae

= Lituitidae =

Lituitidae Temporal range: late L Ord - ? Sil

Family of molluscs

The Lituitidae are a family of evolved tarphycerids characterized by a long orthoconic section that follows a coiled juvenile portion at the apex, along with a generally tubular siphuncle, which like that of the barrandeocerids is composed of thin connecting rings.

== Taxonomic position ==
Flower and Kummel (1950) included the Lituitidae in the Barranderocerida which are now included in the Tarphycerida as a number of derived families. Furnish and Glenister (1964) removed the Lituitidae to the Tarphycerida on the basis of observed similarities in the structure of the siphuncle. Other taxonomies, e.g. Dzik (1981) include the Lituitidae in the Orthocerida partly on the basis of the subcentral siphuncle and thin connecting rings, on the misconception that Rhynchorthoceras is ancestral.

== Classification ==
The Lituitidae comprise two basic groups, based on general form. One is represented by Ancistroceras and Holmiceras and probably includes Angelinoceras. The other is represented by Litoceras, which first appears later in the early Middle Ordovician.

== Characteristics ==
The coiled juvenile portions of the Lituitidae are characterized by a deep hyponomic sinus and lateral salients at the aperture, indicating a high degree of mobility. The orthoconic adult portions are characterized by a shallow hyponomic sinus as in Ancistroceras indicating a more passive lifestyle, or a complex aperture with lappets as in Litoceras.

== Derivation and evolution ==
The earliest known lituitids are Ancistroceras and Holmiceras which made their first appearances in the latter part of the Early Ordovician, well before Rhynchorthoceras. The precise ancestry for either is unknown, although evolutionary possibilities can be found in various tarphyceratid and trocholitid genera. The tendency for the adult tarphycerid shell to unwind, or straighten out, is well documented. This even occurs in some ammonoids, in the ammonitid Bacultidae and in the ceratitid Choristoceratidae. Nowhere is there any direct evidence of orthoconic forms developing coiling at their apexes nor does any obvious advantage exist for them to have done so.
