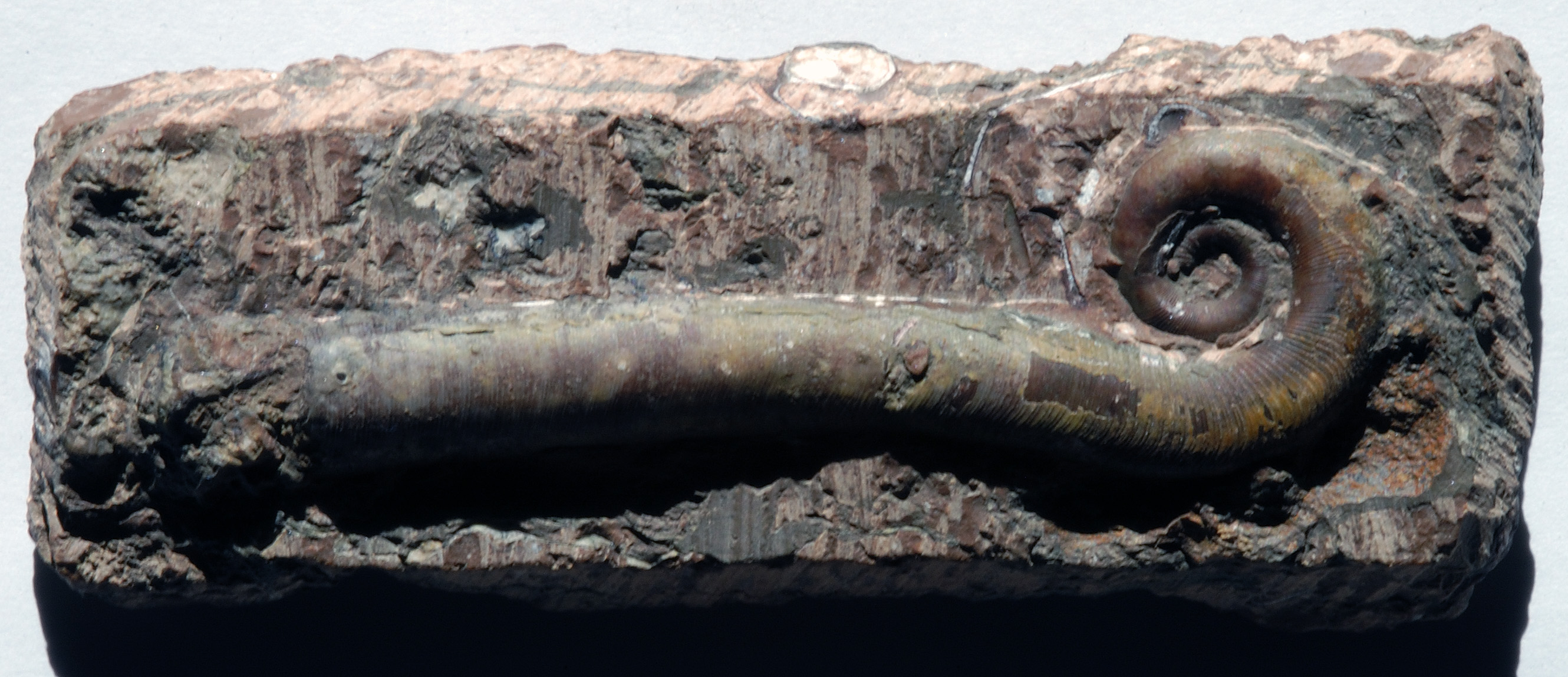
- Trilacinoceras

Scientific classification
- Domain: Eukaryota
- Kingdom: Animalia
- Phylum: Mollusca
- Class: Cephalopoda
- Subclass: †Orthoceratoidea
- Order: †Lituitida

= Lituitida =

Lituitida Temporal range: Ordovician

Order of molluscs

Lituitida is an order of orthoceratoid cephalopods. They correspond to the family Lituitidae of the Treatise (Furnish & Glenister, 1964), reranked as an order and combined with other orthoceratoids. They are considered to be more closely related to the Orthocerida than to the Ascocerida or Pseudorthocerida which are also included.

Lituitids are characterized by smooth to annulate shells in which the juvenile portion near the apex is coiled or cyrtoconic. The adult portion is straight or slightly sigmoidal and may be expanded. Growth lines show a deep hyponomic sinus and lateral ocular sinuses. The siphuncle is subcentral with layered connecting rings. Cameral deposits are prevalent and concentrated more ventrally. The apex is small and spherical and lacks a cicatrix. The Lituitida, which were originally included in the Tarphycerida as the Lituitidae (Furnish and Glenister) have their beginnings in the Early Ordovician with forms like Ancistroceras. Their diversity increased after the late Arenigian extinction (Floian-Dapingian) at the end of the Canadian Epoch and take a tumble following the early Cincinnatian (Sandbian) in the early Late Ordovician, from which the group never recovers.

It is thought that they had a planktonic juvenile stage in their life cycle and that mature adults lived in the shallow waters of the open ocean.

Some 8 genera have been described, all from the Baltic region of northern Europe. One genus, Holmiceras, is limited to the Lower Ordovician and one, Ancistroceras, comes from both the lower and middle of the period. Five genera included the type genus, Lituites, are known only from the Middle Ordovician and one, Tyrioceras, is known from the Middle and Upper Ordovician, the last of its kind.

One study argued that Lituitida (also considered a suborder, Lituitina) was closely related to the proposed order Pallioceratida (or suborder Pallioceratina). Under this hypothesis, they would collectively form the superorder Astrovioidea (or order Astroviida), which was diagnosed based on extensive cameral deposits which partially obliterate the connecting rings. However, the validity of Pallioceratida/Pallioceratina or Astroviodea/Astroviida are not universally accepted.
