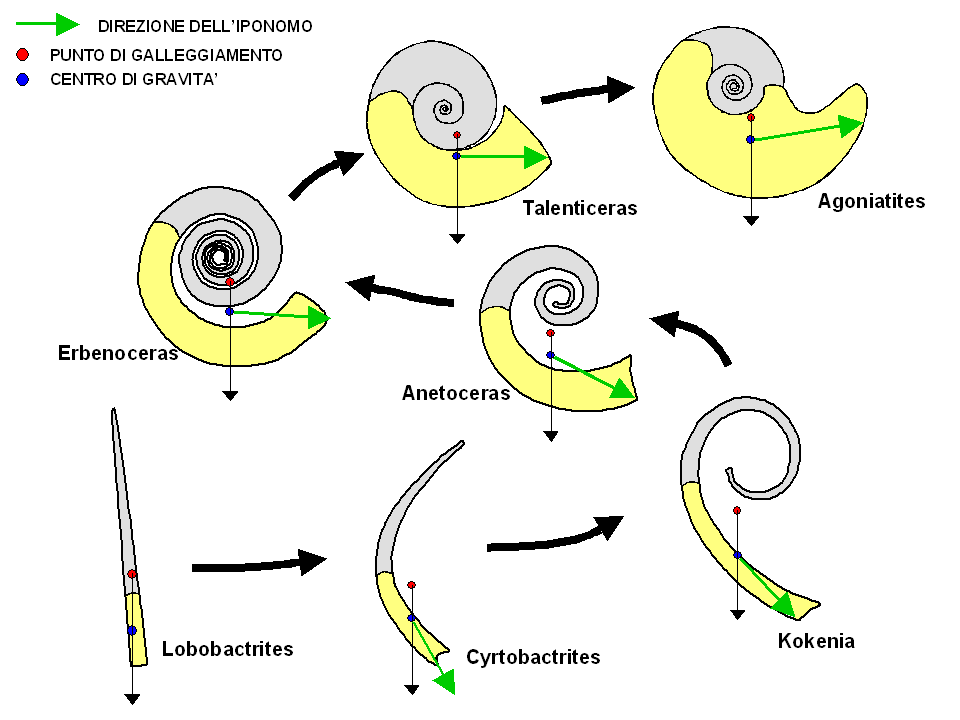
- Diagram showing evolution of Bactritida to Ammonoidea

Scientific classification
- Kingdom: Animalia
- Phylum: Mollusca
- Class: Cephalopoda
- Clade: Neocephalopoda
- Subclass: †Bactritoidea; Shimanskiy, 1951
- Order: †Bactritida; Shimanskiy, 1951

Families
- †Bactritidae; †Parabactritidae; †Ammonoidea?; Coleoidea?; Bactritida incertae sedis; †Cochleiferoceras; †Cyclobactrites

= Bactritida =

Bactritida Temporal range: 407–231 Ma Pragian (questionable) or early Emsian – Middle Carnian Possible descendant taxon Coleoidea survives to present

Fossil order of cephalopods

The Bactritida are a small order of more or less straight-shelled (orthoconic) cephalopods that first appeared during the Emsian stage of the Devonian period (407 million years ago) with questionable origins in the Pragian stage before 409 million years ago, and persisted until the Carnian pluvial event in the upper middle Carnian stage of the Triassic period (231 million years ago). They are considered ancestors of the ammonoids, as well as of the coleoids (octopus, squid, cuttlefish, and the extinct belemnites).

Bactritids are distinguished from the more primitive nautiloids by the small size and globular shape of the protoconch, the so-called embryonic shell. Nautiloids have relatively large embryonic shells, and living species lay a few large eggs. In contrast, bactritids and ammonoids produced large numbers of small eggs, each housing a small embryonic shell.

== Classification and description ==
Bactritida (Erben 1964) are characterized by orthoconic to cyrtoconic shells that may be long or short with a narrow siphuncle invariably in contact with the ventral wall and sutures uniformly with V-shaped ventral lobes. Septal necks are orthochoanitic to cyrtochoanitic, the apical angle may be small or large, and the protoconch is globular to egg-shaped. The Bactritida comprise two families, the Bactritidae and the Parabactritidae.

=== Bactritidae ===
The Bactritidae are characterized by long orthoconic to cyrtoconic shells with a small apical angle (less than 10°) and septal necks that are orthochoanitic. Chamber length is variable. The Bactritidae contain eight recognized genera. Bactrites has the longest range, from the Lower Devonian to the Upper Permian, and even possibly from the Silurian. The Bactritidae gave rise to the Ammonoidea in the Early Devonian starting with an early Bactrites and going with increasingly tight curvature from Lobobactrites to Cyrtobactrites, leading to the gyroconic Anetoceras of the Anarcestida (Ammonoidea).

=== Parabactritidae ===
The Parabactritidae are characterized by orthoconic and breviconic shells with a large apical angle (greater than about 10°) and septal necks that are vary from orthochoanitic or suborthochoanitic to cyrtochoanitic. The Parabactritidae contain some five described genera and are thought to have given rise to the Belemnoidea (Coleoidea).

== Derivation ==
The Bactritida have their origin in the Orthocerida, nautiloid cephalopods that first appeared in the Ordovician.

Bactroceras (Eobactrites), an early middle-Ordovician cephalopod, is considered as a true bactritid by some paleontologists, because of its spherical apex and ventral siphuncle.

This view is challenged by more recent research. The shell of Bactroceras has important differences from those of true bactritids. For instance, the first chamber of Bactroceras resembles that of other Ordovician orthocerids, such as Archigeisonoceras and Hedstroemoceras: it is about 10 mm in diameter, and is short, forming a spherical cap. True bactritids more strongly resemble late Silurian and Devonian orthocerids, whose first chamber is only about 5 mm across. Moreover, a large stratigraphic gap of nearly 50 million years occurs between Bactroceras and the next orthocones with a spherical apex and ventral siphuncle.

== Paleoecology and lifestyle ==
Bactritids, especially the Bactritidae, seem to have lived in a vertical orientation, head down, as probably did many of the Orthocerida such as Michelinoceras and Buttsoceras, or these forms without extensive internal ballast may simply have been more flexible in their vertical orientation than the well-ballasted bottom-dwellers such as the actinocerids and endocerids. The ventral siphuncle of the Bactritida would have facilitated chamber dewatering in either horizontal or vertical orientation or in between. A central siphuncle would have made horizontal or near-horizontal dewatering more difficult, though. Bactritids, like cephalopods in general, were probably active predators with tentacles of some sort. As with other externally shelled forms, they were probably not active swimmers in the sense of fish or squid. Rather, they were likely stalkers and ambush predators hiding among the seaweeds, snatching prey found below.
