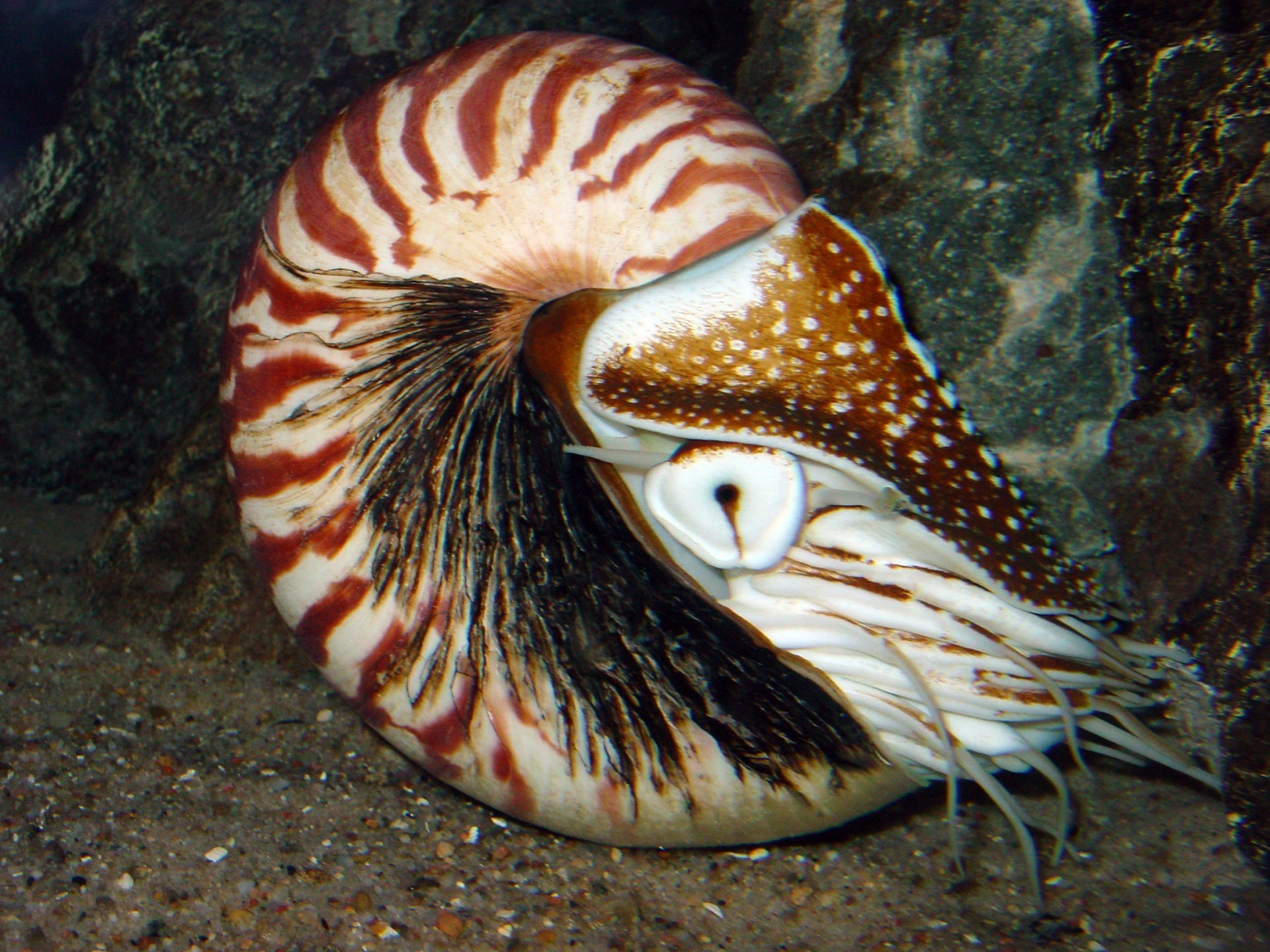
- Nautilus pompilius
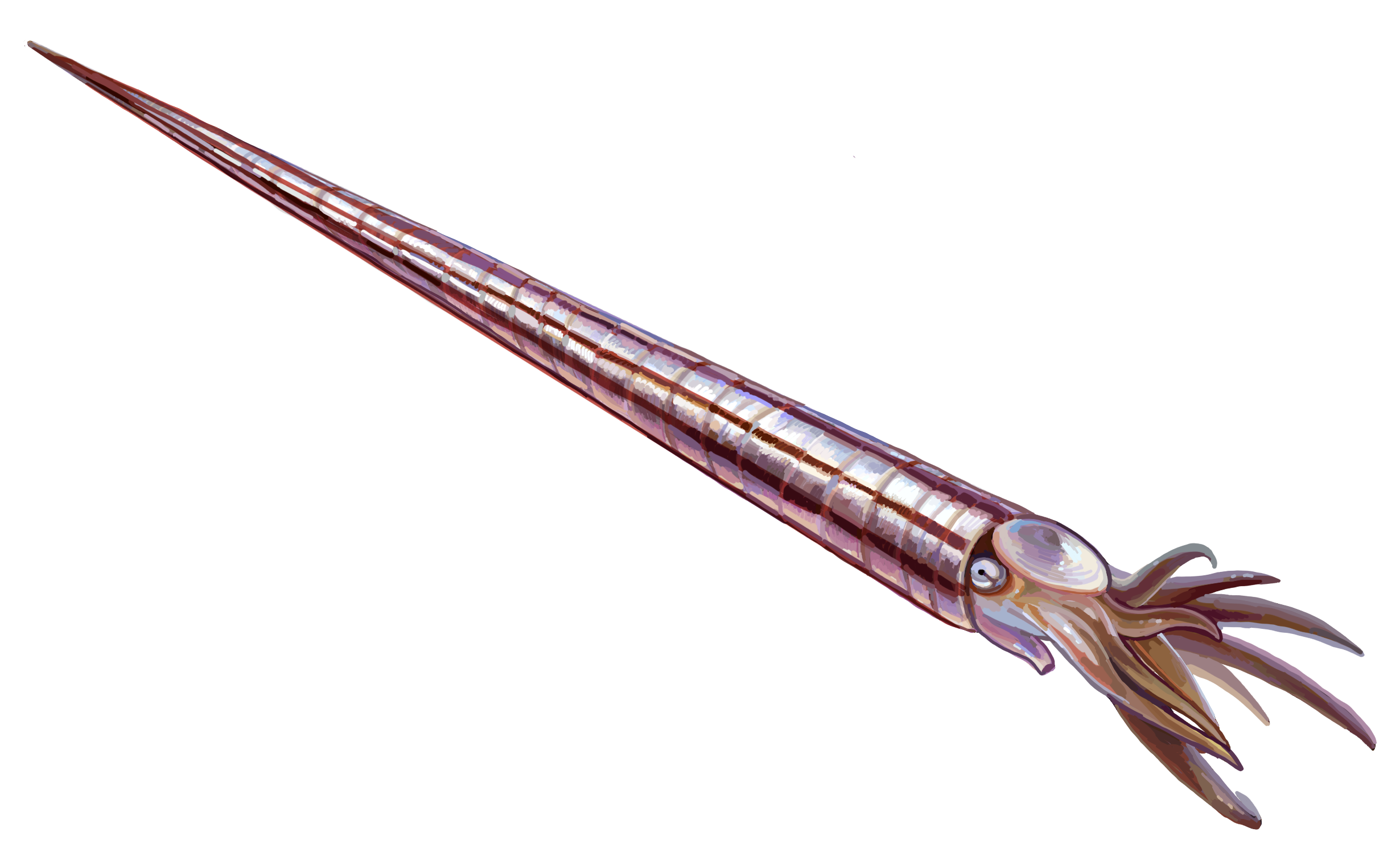
- Life restoration of Endoceras, an endocerid nautiloid with an orthocone (straight) shell

Scientific classification
- Kingdom: Animalia
- Phylum: Mollusca
- Class: Cephalopoda
- Subclass: Nautiloidea; Agassiz, 1847

Groups included
- †Plectronoceratoidea (paraphyletic); †Endoceratoidea; †Multiceratoidea (possibly paraphyletic); †Orthoceratoidea (paraphyletic); Nautilida

Cladistically included but traditionally excluded taxa
- †Ammonoidea; Coleoidea

= Nautiloid =

Nautiloids Temporal range: 495–0 Ma Late Cambrian – Recent

Extant subclass of cephalopods

Nautiloids are a group of cephalopods (Mollusca) which originated in the Late Cambrian and are represented today by the living Nautilus and Allonautilus. Fossil nautiloids are diverse and species rich, with over 2,500 recorded species. They flourished during the early Paleozoic era, when they constituted the main predatory animals. Early in their evolution, nautiloids developed an extraordinary diversity of shell shapes, including coiled morphologies and giant straight-shelled forms (orthocones). No orthoconic and only a handful of coiled species, the nautiluses, survive to the present day.

In a broad sense, "nautiloid" refers to a major cephalopod subclass or collection of subclasses (Nautiloidea sensu lato). Nautiloids are typically considered one of three main groups of cephalopods, along with the extinct ammonoids (ammonites) and living coleoids (such as squid, octopus, and kin). While ammonoids and coleoids are monophyletic clades with exclusive ancestor-descendant relationships, this is not the case for nautiloids. Instead, nautiloids are a paraphyletic grade of various early-diverging cephalopod lineages, including the ancestors of ammonoids and coleoids. Some authors prefer a narrower definition of Nautiloidea (Nautiloidea sensu stricto), as a singular subclass including only those cephalopods which are closer to living nautiluses than they are to either ammonoids or coleoids.

== Taxonomic relationships ==
Nautiloids are among the group of animals known as cephalopods, an advanced class of mollusks which also includes ammonoids, belemnites and modern coleoids such as octopus and squid. Other mollusks include gastropods, scaphopods and bivalves.

Traditionally, the most common classification of the cephalopods has been a four-fold division (by Bather, 1888), into the orthoceratoids, nautiloids, ammonoids, and coleoids. This article is about nautiloids in that broad sense, sometimes called Nautiloidea sensu lato.

Cladistically speaking, nautiloids are a paraphyletic assemblage united by shared primitive (plesiomorphic) features not found in derived cephalopods. In other words, they are a grade group that is thought to have given rise to orthoceratoids, ammonoids and coleoids, and are defined by the exclusion of those descendent groups. Both ammonoids and coleoids have traditionally been assumed to have descended from bactritids, which in turn arose from straight-shelled orthoceratoids. The ammonoids appeared early in the Devonian period (some 400 million years ago) and became abundant in the Mesozoic era, before their extinction at the end of the Cretaceous.

Some workers apply the name Nautiloidea to a more exclusive group, called Nautiloidea sensu stricto. This taxon consists only of those orders that are clearly related to the modern nautilus to the exclusion of other modern cephalopods. In this restricted definition, membership is somewhat variable between authors, but it usually includes Tarphycerida, Oncocerida, and Nautilida.

== Shell ==
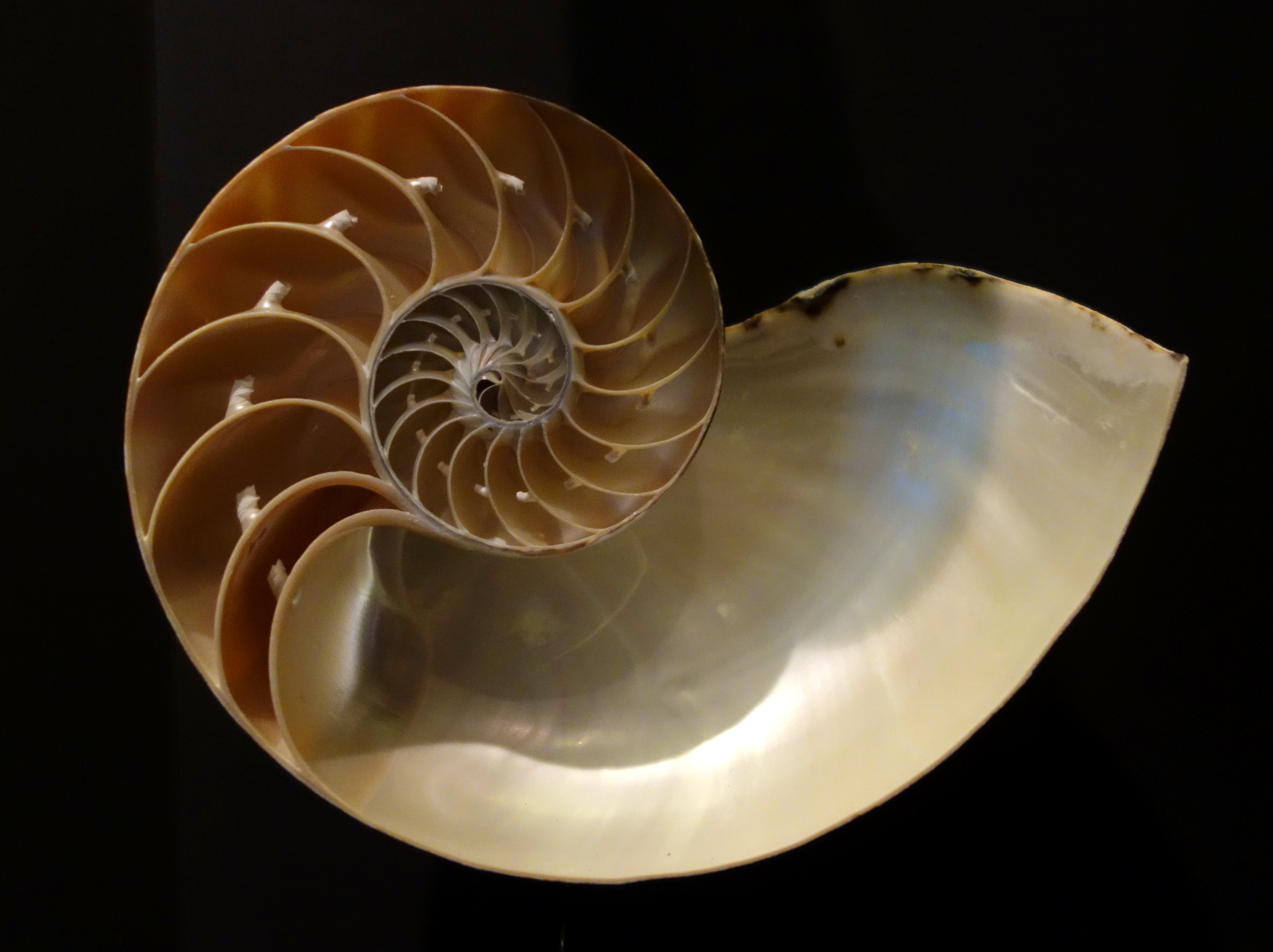
A cross-section of a Nautilus pompilius shell, showing the large body chamber, shrinking camerae, concave septa, and septal necks (partial siphuncle supports)

All nautiloids have a large external shell, divided into a narrowing chambered region (the phragmocone) and a broad, open body chamber occupied by the animal in life. The outer wall of the shell, also known as the conch, defines its overall shape and texture. The chambers (camerae) of the phragmocone are separated from each other by thin curved walls (septa), which formed during growth spurts of the animal. During a growth spurt, the rear of the mantle secretes a new septum, adding another chamber to the series of shell chambers. At the same time, shell material is added around the shell opening (aperture), enlarging the body chamber and providing more room for the growing animal. Sutures (or suture lines) appear where each septum contacts the wall of the outer shell. In life, they are visible as a series of narrow wavy lines on the outer surface of the shell. Like their underlying septa, the sutures of the nautiloids are simple in shape, being either straight or slightly curved. This is different from the "zigzag" sutures of the goniatites and the highly complex sutures of the ammonites.

The septa are perforated by the siphuncle, a fleshy tube which runs through each of the internal chambers of the shell. Surrounding the fleshy tube of the siphuncle are structures made of aragonite (a polymorph of calcium carbonate – which during fossilisation is often recrystallized to calcite, a more stable form of calcium carbonate [CaCO_{3}]): septal necks and connecting rings. Some of the earlier nautiloids deposited calcium carbonate in the empty chambers (called cameral deposits) or within the siphuncle (endosiphuncular deposits), a process which may have been connected with controlling buoyancy. The nature of the siphuncle and its position within the shell are important in classifying nautiloids and can help distinguish them from ammonoids. The siphuncle is on the shell periphery in most ammonoids whereas it runs through the center of the chambers in some nautiloids, including living nautiluses.

The subclass Nautiloidea, in its broader definition, is distinguished from other cephalopods by two main characteristics: the septa are smoothly concave in the forward direction, producing external sutures which are generally simple and smooth. The siphuncle is supported by septal necks which point to the rear (i.e. retrosiphonate) throughout the ontogeny of the animal.

Modern nautiluses have deeply coiled shells which are involute, meaning that the larger and more recent whorls overlap and obscure older whorls. The shells of fossil nautiloids may be either straight (i.e., orthoconic as in Orthoceras and Rayonnoceras), curved (as in Cyrtoceras) coiled (as in Cenoceras), or rarely a helical coil (as in Lorieroceras). Some species' shells—especially in the late Paleozoic and early Mesozoic—are ornamented with spines and ribs, but most have a smooth shell. The shells are formed of aragonite, although the cameral deposits may consist of primary calcite. The coloration of the shell of the modern nautilus is quite prominent, and, although somewhat rarely, the shell coloration has been known to be preserved in fossil nautiloids. They often show color patterns only on the dorsal side, suggesting that the living animals swam horizontally.

== Modern nautiloids ==
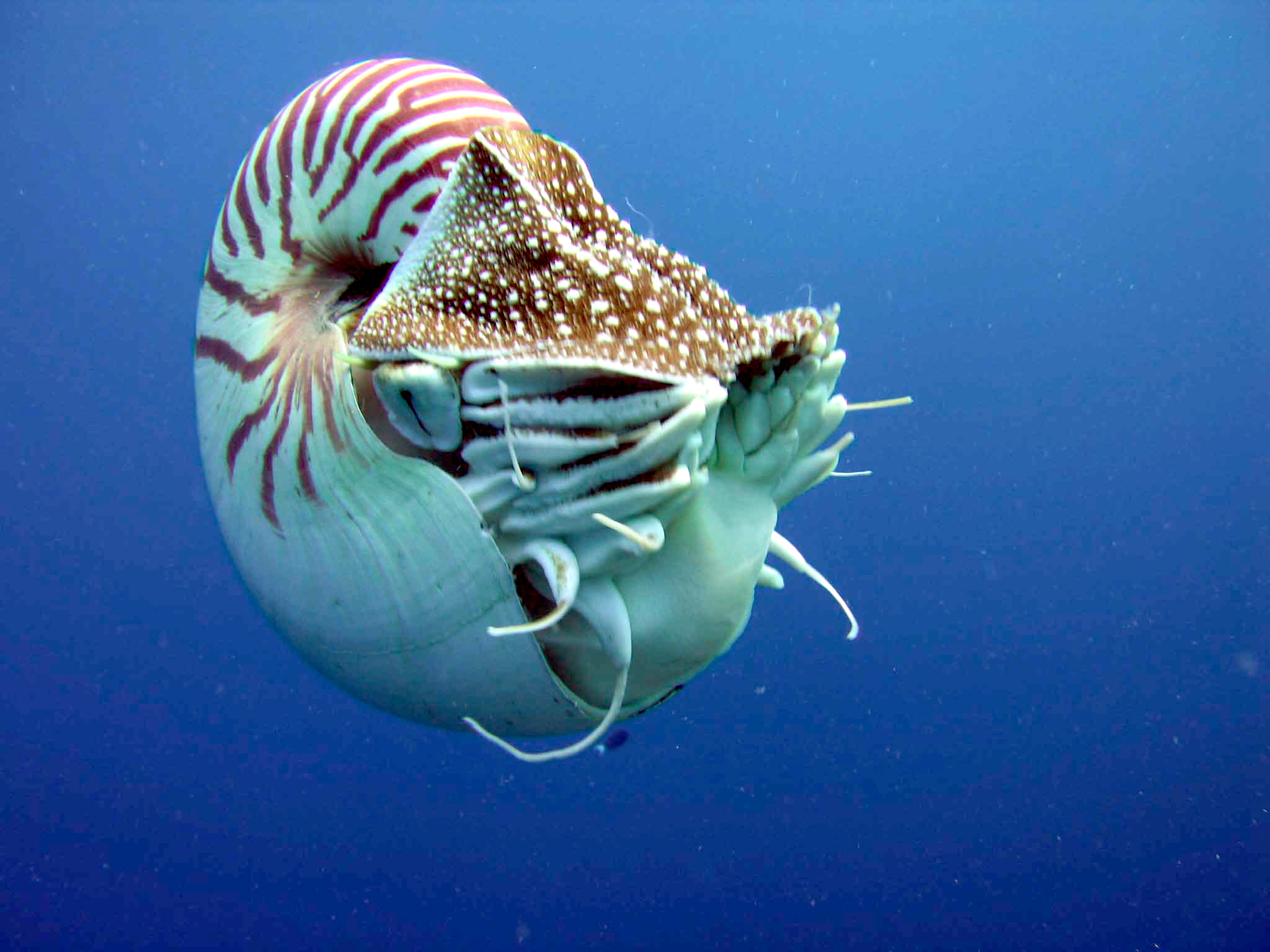
Nautilus belauensis

Much of what is known about the extinct nautiloids is based on what we know about modern nautiluses, such as the chambered nautilus, which is found in the southwest Pacific Ocean from Samoa to the Philippines, and in the Indian Ocean off the coast of Australia. It is not usually found in waters less than 100 meters (328 feet) deep and may be found as far down as 500 to 700 meters (1,640 to 2,300 feet).

Nautili are free swimming animals that possess a head with two simple lens-free eyes and arms (or tentacles). They have a smooth shell over a large body chamber, which is divided into subchambers filled with an inert gas (similar to the composition of atmospheric air, but with more nitrogen and less oxygen) making the animal neutrally buoyant in the water. As many as 90 tentacles are arranged in two circles around the mouth. The animal is predatory, and has jaws which are horny and beak-like, allowing it to feed on crustaceans.

Empty nautilus shells may drift a considerable distance and have been reported from Japan, India and Africa. Undoubtedly the same applies to the shells of fossil nautiloids, the gas inside the shell keeping it buoyant for some time after the animal's death, allowing the empty shell to be carried some distance from where the animal lived before finally sinking to the seafloor.

Nautili propel themselves by jet propulsion, expelling water from an elongated funnel called the hyponome, which can be pointed in different directions to control their movement. Unlike the belemnites and other cephalopods, modern nautili do not have an ink sac, and there is no evidence to suggest that the extinct forms possessed one either. Furthermore, unlike the extinct ammonoids, the modern nautilus lacks an aptychus, a biomineralized plate which is proposed to act as an operculum which closes the shell to protect the body. However, aptychus-like plates are known from some extinct nautiloids, and they may be homologous to the fleshy hood of a modern nautilus.

== Fossil record ==
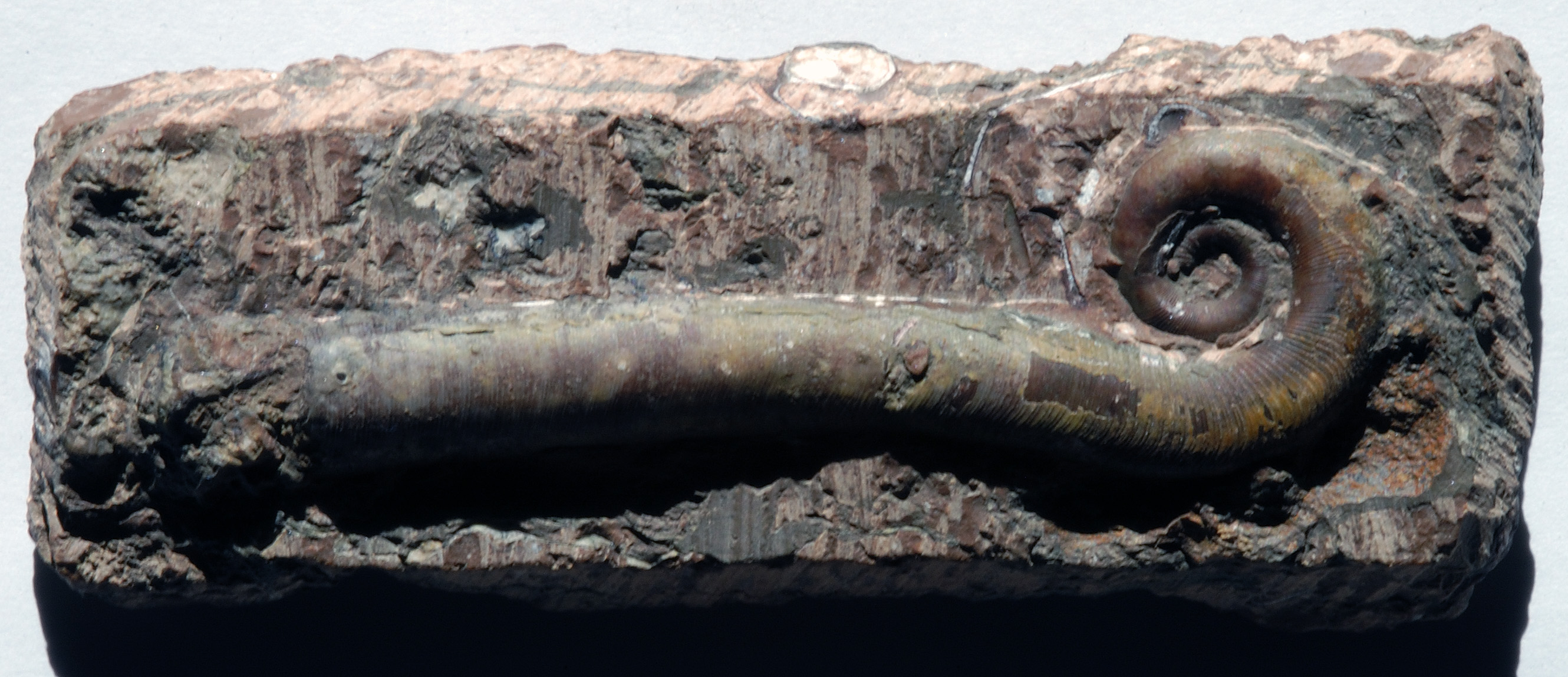
Fossil nautiloid Trilacinoceras from the Ordovician of China.

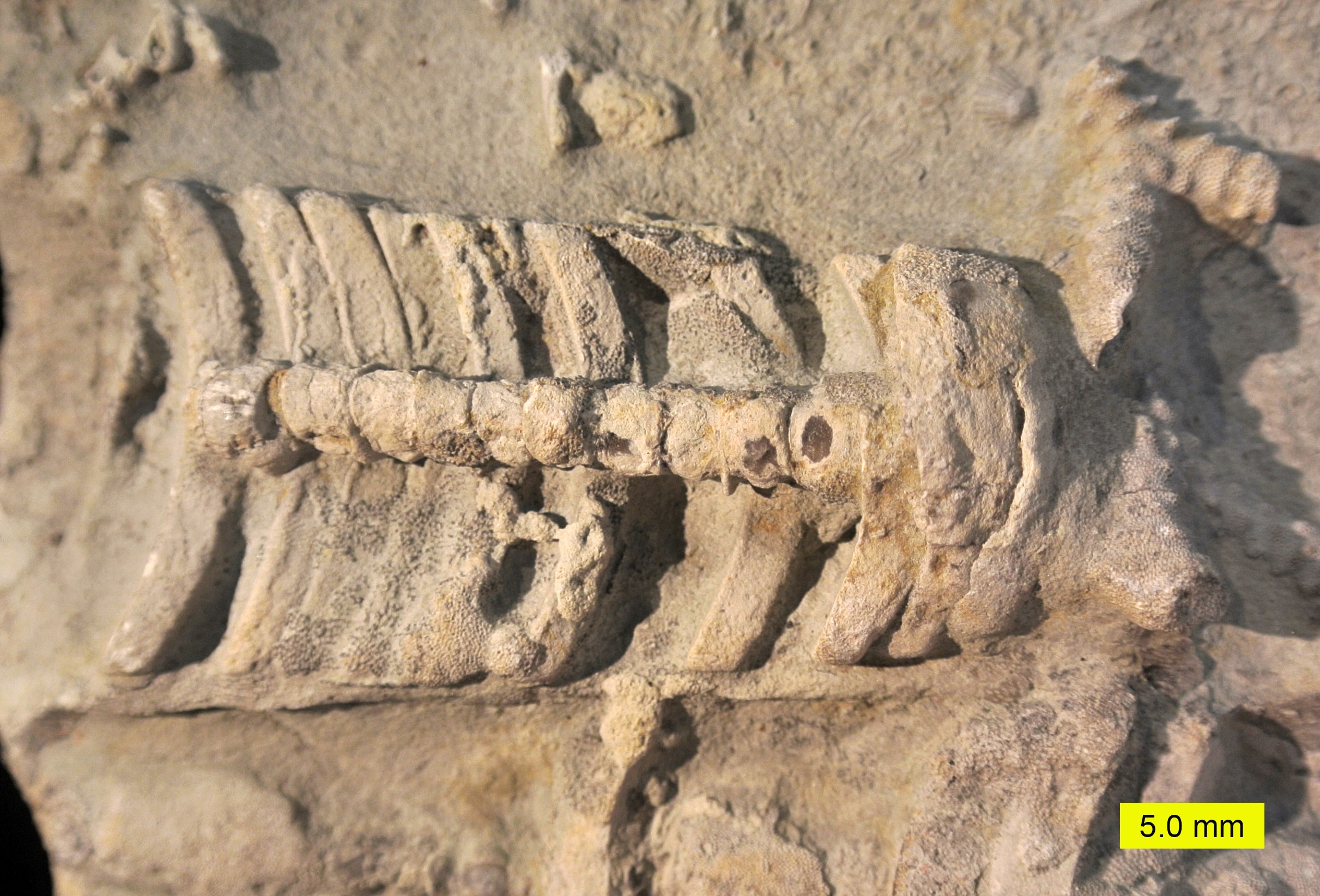
Fossil orthoconic nautiloid from the Ordovician of Kentucky; an internal mold showing siphuncle and half-filled camerae, both encrusted.

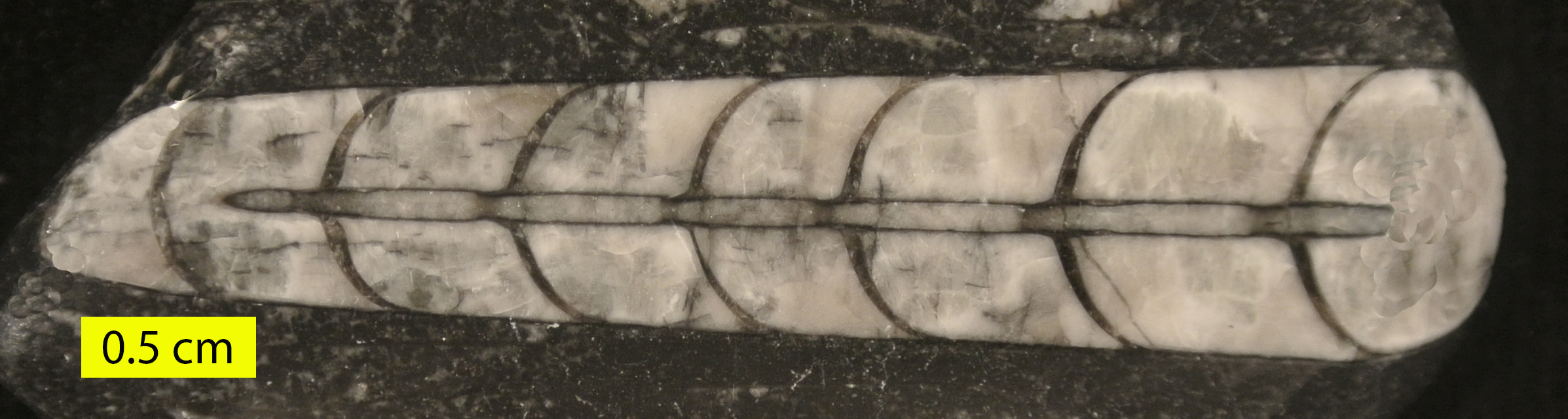
Cross-section of an Orthoceras nautiloid from the Siluro-Devonian of Erfoud, Morocco.

Nautiloids are often found as fossils in early Palaeozoic rocks (less so in more recent strata).

The rocks of the Ordovician period in the Baltic coast and parts of the United States contain a variety of nautiloid fossils, and specimens such as Discitoceras and Rayonnoceras may be found in the limestones of the Carboniferous period in Ireland. The marine rocks of the Jurassic period in Britain often yield specimens of Cenoceras, and nautiloids such as Eutrephoceras are also found in the Pierre Shale formation of the Cretaceous period in the north-central United States.

Specimens of the Ordovician nautiloid Endoceras have been recorded measuring up to 5.7 meters (19 feet) in shell length, and there is a description of a specimen estimated to have reached 9.1 meters (30 feet), although that specimen is reported as destroyed. These large nautiloids would have been formidable predators of other marine animals at the time they lived.

In some localities, such as Scandinavia and Morocco, the fossils of orthoconic nautiloids accumulated in such large numbers that they form limestones composed of nonspecific assemblages known as cephalopod beds, cephalopod limestones, nautiloid limestones, or Orthoceras limestones in the geological literature. Although the term Orthoceras now only refers to a Baltic coast Ordovician genus, in prior times it was employed as a general name given to all straight-shelled nautiloids that lived from the Ordovician to the Triassic periods (but were most common in the early Paleozoic era).

== Evolutionary history ==
Nautiloids are first known from the late Cambrian Fengshan Formation of northeastern China, where they seem to have been quite diverse (at the time this was a warm shallow sea rich in marine life). However, although four orders have been proposed from the 131 species named, there is no certainty that all of these are valid, and indeed it is likely that these taxa are seriously oversplit.

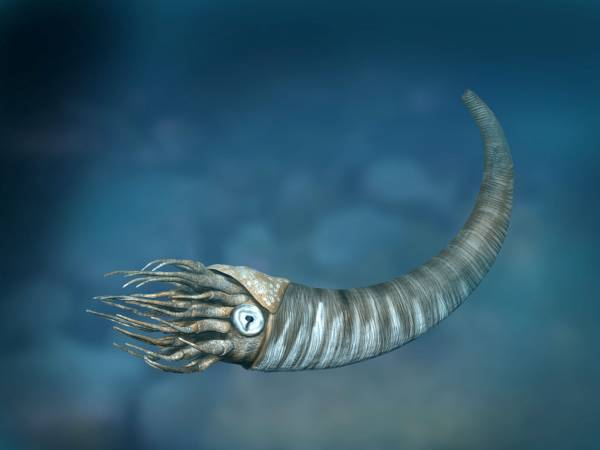
Reconstruction of Cyrtoceras sp

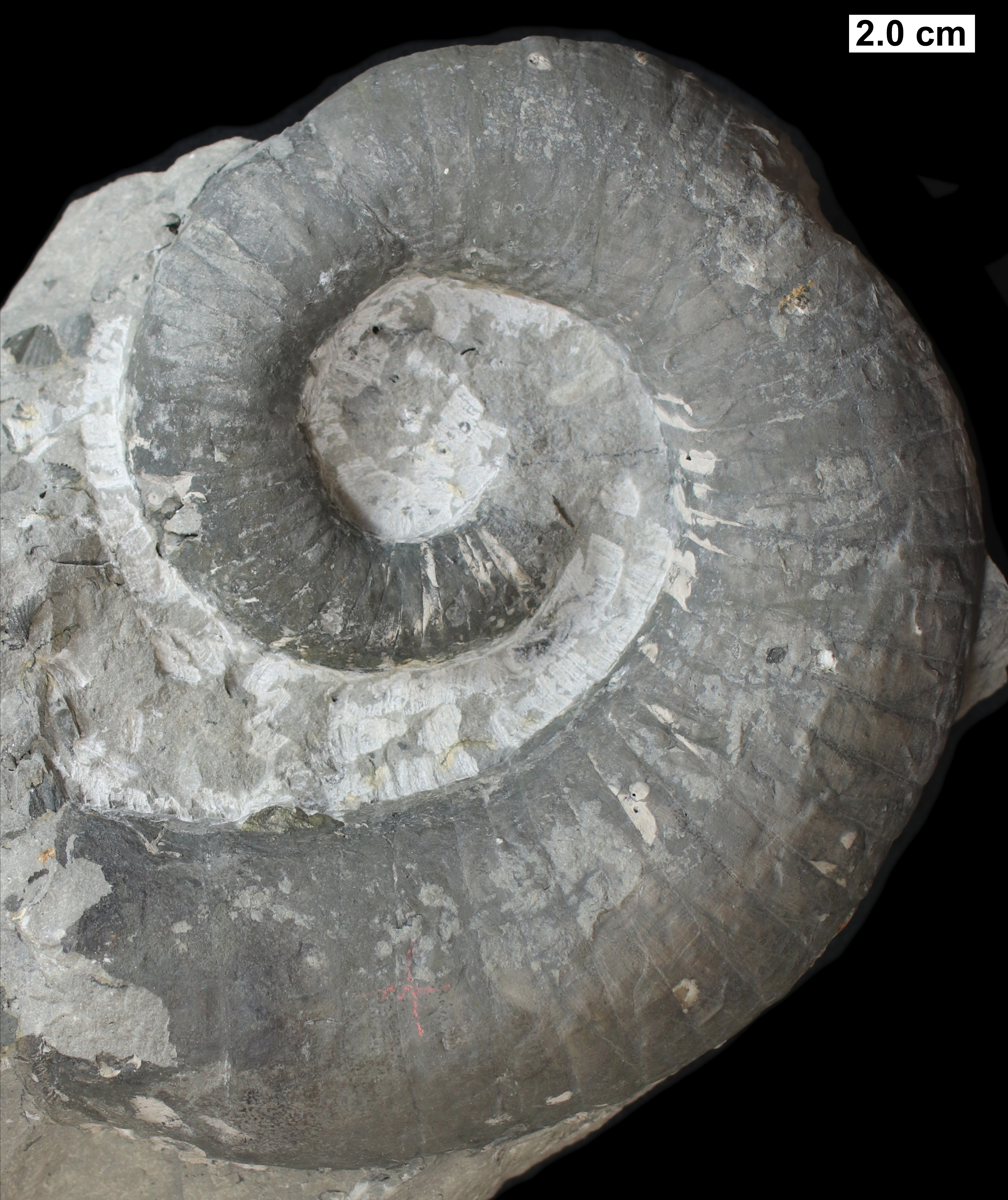
Gyronaedyceras eryx, an oncocerid from the Middle Devonian of Wisconsin

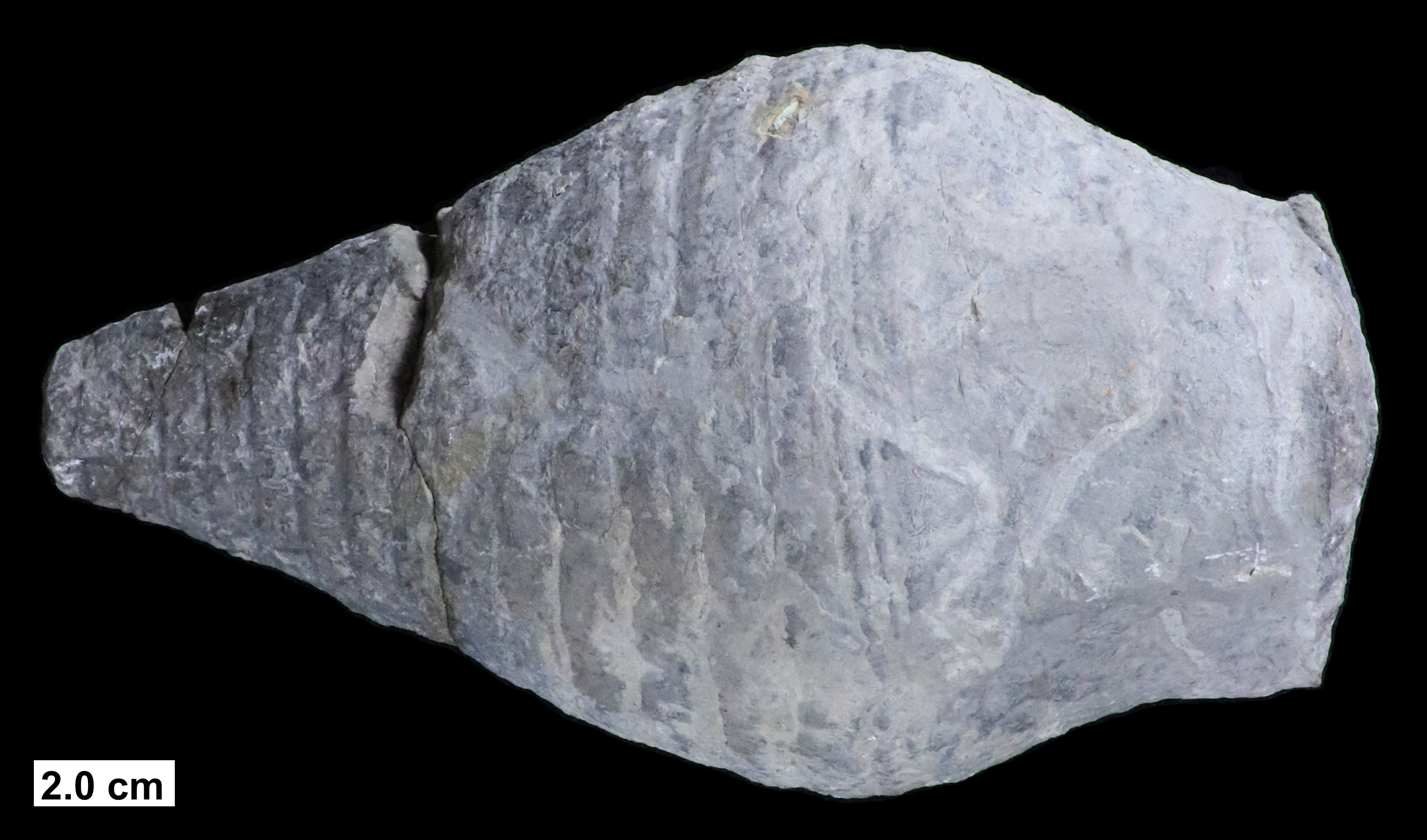
Acleistoceras whitfieldi, an oncocerid from the Middle Devonian of Wisconsin

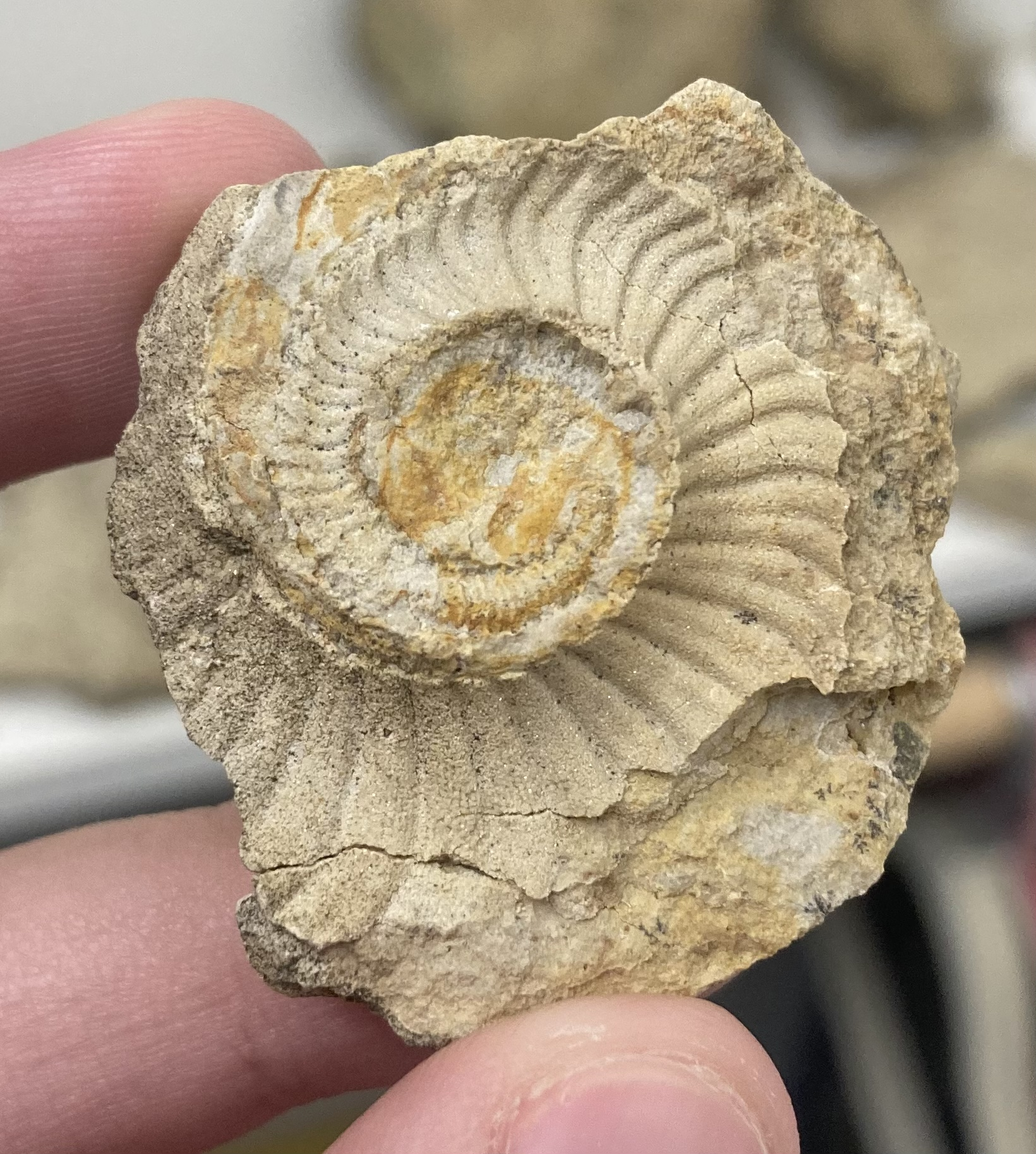
Trocholites, an tarphycerid from the Upper Ordovician of Wisconsin

Most of these early forms died out, but a single family, the Ellesmeroceratidae, survived to the early Ordovician, where it ultimately gave rise to all subsequent cephalopods. In the Early and Middle Ordovician the nautiloids underwent an evolutionary radiation. Some eight new orders appeared at this time, covering a great diversity of shell types and structure, and ecological lifestyles.

Nautiloids remained at the height of their range of adaptations and variety of forms throughout the Ordovician, Silurian, and Devonian periods, with various straight, curved and coiled shell forms coexisting at the same time. Several of the early orders became extinct over that interval, but others rose to prominence.

Nautiloids began to decline in the Devonian, perhaps due to competition with their descendants and relatives the Ammonoids and Coleoids, with only the Nautilida holding their own (and indeed increasing in diversity). Their shells became increasingly tightly coiled, while both numbers and variety of non-nautilid species continued to decrease throughout the Carboniferous and Permian.

The massive extinctions at the end of the Permian were less damaging to nautiloids than to other taxa and a few groups survived into the early Mesozoic, including pseudorthocerids, bactritids, nautilids and possibly orthocerids. The last straight-shelled forms were long thought to have disappeared at the end of the Triassic, but a possible orthocerid has been found in Cretaceous rocks. Apart from this exception, only a single nautiloid suborder, the Nautilina, continued throughout the Mesozoic, where they co-existed quite happily with their more specialised ammonoid cousins. Most of these forms differed only slightly from the modern nautilus. They had a brief resurgence in the early Cenozoic (perhaps filling the niches vacated by the ammonoids in the end Cretaceous extinction), and maintained a worldwide distribution up until the middle of the Cenozoic Era. With the global cooling of the Miocene and Pliocene, their geographic distribution shrank and these hardy and long-lived animals declined in diversity again. Today there are only six living species, all belonging to two genera, Nautilus (the pearly nautilus), and Allonautilus.

The recent decrease in the once worldwide distribution of nautiloids is now believed to have been caused by the spread of pinnipeds. From the Oligocene onward, the appearance of pinnipeds in the geological record of a region coincides with the disappearance of nautiloids from that region. As a result, nautiloids are now limited to their current distribution in the tropical Indo-Pacific Ocean, where pinnipeds are absent. The genus Aturia seem to have temporarily survived regions where pinnipeds were present through adaptations to fast and agile swimming, but eventually went extinct as well. Predation by short-snouted whales and the development of OMZs, preventing nautiloids from retreating into deeper water, are also cited as other potential causes of extinction.

== Classification ==
=== Older classification systems ===
A consensus on nautiloid classification has traditionally been elusive and subject to change, as different workers emphasize different fundamental traits when reconstructing evolutionary events. The largest and most widely cited publication on nautiloid taxonomy is the Treatise on Invertebrate Paleontology Part K by Teichert et al. 1964, though new information has rendered this volume outdated and in need of revision. Treatise Part K was based on previous classification schemes by Flower & Kummel (1950) and the Russian Osnovy Paleontologii Vol. 5 (1962) textbook.

Other comprehensive taxonomic schemes have been devised by Wade (1988), Teichert (1988), and Shevyrev (2006). Wade (1988) divided the subclass Nautiloidea (sensu lato) into 6 superorders, incorporating orders that are phylogenetically related. They are:

- †Plectronoceratoidea = †Plectronocerida, †Protactinocerida, †Yanhecerida, and †Ellesmerocerida.
- †Endoceratoidea = †Endocerida
- †Orthoceratoidea = †Orthocerida, †Ascocerida, and †Pseudorthocerida (the Orthoceratoidea of Kröger 2007)
- Nautilitoidea = †Tarphycerida, †Oncocerida, and Nautilida.
- †Actinoceratoidea = †Actinocerida
- †Discosoritoidea = †Discosorida

Three of these superorders were established for orders of uncertain placement: Endocerida, Actinocerida, and Discosorida. The other three unite related orders which share a common ancestor and form a branch of the nautiloid taxonomic tree: Plectronoceratoidea, which consists mostly of small Cambrian forms that include the ancestors of subsequent stocks; Orthoceratoidea, which unites different primarily orthoconic orders (including the ancestors for Bacritida and Ammonoidea); and Nautilitoidea, which includes the first coiled cephalopods, Tarphycerida, as well as Nautilida, which includes the recent Nautilus. Another order, Bactritida, which is derived from Orthocerida, is sometimes included with Nautiloidea, sometimes with Ammonoidea, and sometimes placed in a subclass of its own, Bactritoidea.

Recently some workers in the field have come to recognize Dissidocerida as a distinct order, along with Pseudorthocerida, both previously included in Orthocerida as subtaxa.

=== Early cladistic efforts ===
Cladistic approaches are rare in nautiloid systematics. Many nautiloid orders (not to mention the group as a whole) are not monophyletic clades, but rather paraphyletic grades. This means that they include some descendant taxa while excluding others. For example, the paraphyletic order Orthocerida includes numerous orthocerids stretching through the Paleozoic, but it excludes colloids, despite colloids having a well-established ancestry among the orthocerids. Interpretations by Engeser (1996–1998) suggests that nautiloids, and indeed cephalopods in general, should be split into two main clades: Palcephalopoda (including all the nautiloids except Orthocerida and Ascocerida) and Neocephalopoda (the rest of the cephalopods). Palcephalopoda is meant to correspond to groups which are closer to living nautilus, while Neocephalopoda is meant to correspond to groups closer to living coleoids. One issue which this scheme is the necessity of establishing a firm ancestry for nautilus, to contextualize which cephalopods are closer to which of the two living end members. On the basis of morphological traits, Nautilida is most similar to coiled early nautiloids such as the Tarphycerida and Oncocerida. However, these orders diverged from coleoid ancestors in the early Ordovician at the latest, while genetic divergence estimates suggest that Nautilida diverged in the Silurian or Devonian, more consistent with an origin from within Orthoceratoidea.

A phylogenetic study by Lindgren et al. (2004) supported the monophyly of cephalopods, but does not bear on the Palcephalopod/Neocephalopod question, since the only cephalopods included were Nautilus and coleoids.

=== Recent revisions ===
For an in-process revision of Treatise Part K, King & Evans (2019) reclassified nautiloids sensu lato into five subclasses. Major groups were primarily defined by variation in their muscle attachment types. Other traits referenced during this reclassification include protoconch morphology, connecting ring structure, and the extent of cameral and endosiphuncular deposits. While most previous studies referred to subclasses with the suffix '-oidea', these authors instead opted for the suffix '-ia', to prevent confusion between group levels. For example, Nautiloidea sensu stricto was renamed to Nautilia, to differentiate it from the informal broader definition of "nautiloid". In addition, they used the unsimplified names for orders, with the suffix '-atida' rather than the common simplified form, '-ida'.

- Subclass †Plectronoceratia (formerly Plectronoceratoidea)
  - Order †Plectronoceratida
  - Order †Yanheceratida
  - Order †Protactinoceratida
- Subclass †Multiceratia (formerly Multiceratoidea)
  - Order †Ellesmeroceratida
  - Order †Cyrtocerinida
  - Order †Bisonoceratida
  - Order †Oncoceratida
  - Order †Discosorida
- Subclass †Tarphyceratia
  - Order †Tarphyceratida
  - Order †Ascoceratida
- Subclass Nautilia (formerly Nautiloidea sensu stricto)
  - Order Nautilida
- Subclass †Orthoceratia (formerly Orthoceratoidea)
  - Order †Rioceratida
  - Order †Dissidoceratida
  - Order †Orthoceratida
  - Order †Pseudorthoceratida
  - Order †Actinoceratida
  - Order †Astroviida (suborders †Lituitina and †Pallioceratina)
  - Order †Endoceratida

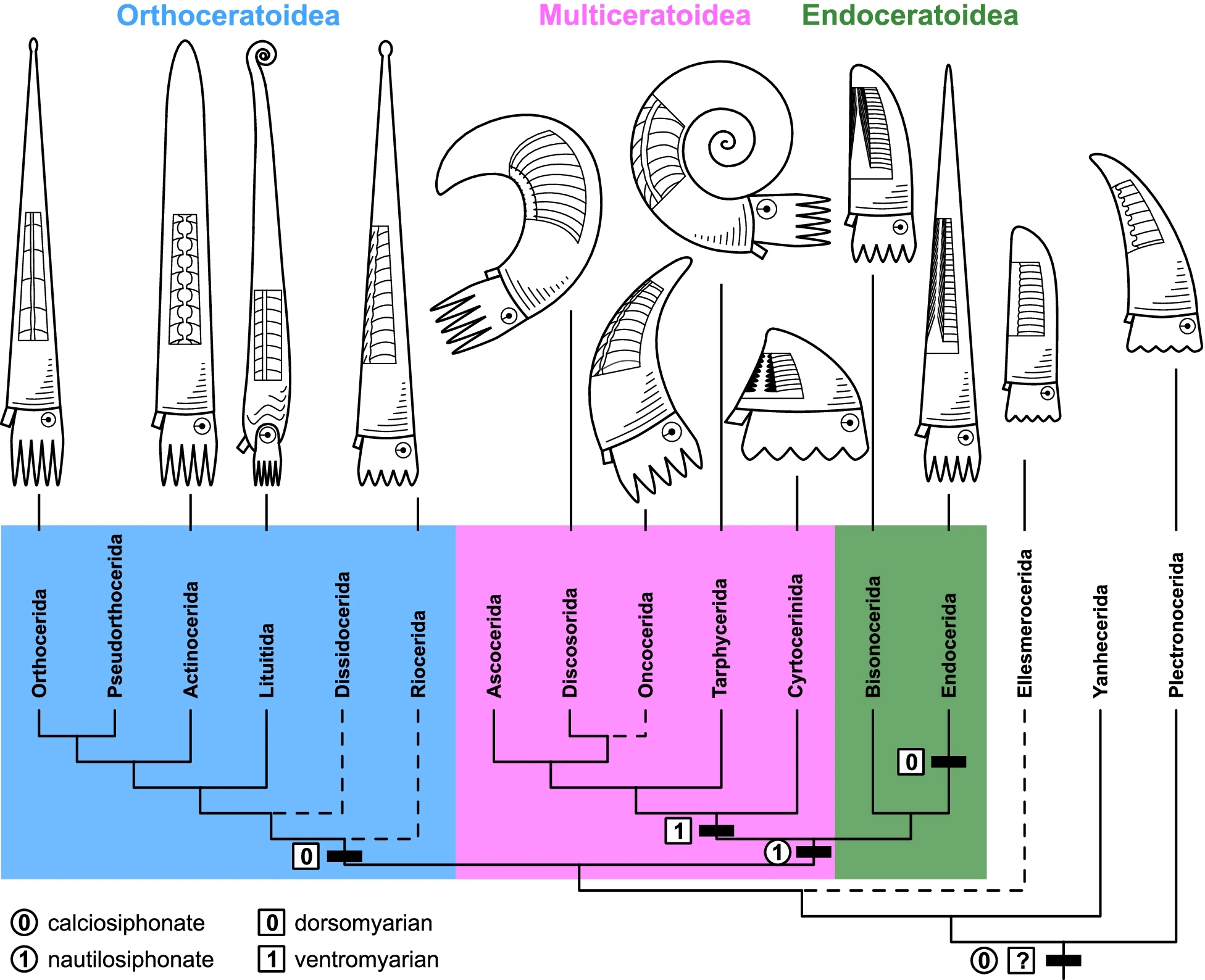
Nautiloid relationships and body types according to Pohle et al. (2022)

Traditional nautiloid classification schemes emphasize certain character traits over others, potentially involving personal bias as to which traits are worth emphasizing according to different authors. This issue may be resolved by sampling all morphological traits equally through bayesian phylogenetic inference. The first cephalopod-focused paper to use this technique was published by Pohle et al. (2022). They recovered several previously hypothesized groups, though many orders were determined to be paraphyletic. The study was focused on early cephalopod diversification in the Late Cambrian and Ordovician, and did not discuss in detail the origin of post-Ordovician groups. The following is a simplified version of their cladogram, showing early cephalopod relationships to the order level (although various isolated families also originated during this diversification event):

- Cephalopoda
  - Plectronocerida
  - - Yanhecerida
    - - Ellesmerocerida (paraphyletic to Endoceratoidea, Multiceratoidea, and Orthoceratoidea)
      - - - Endoceratoidea
            - Endocerida
            - Bisonocerida
          - Multiceratoidea
            - Cyrtocerinida
            - - Tarphycerida (possibly paraphyletic to Nautilida)
              - - Oncocerida (paraphyletic to Ascocerida and Discosorida)
                - - Ascocerida
                  - Discosorida
        - Orthoceratoidea
          - Riocerida (possibly paraphyletic to later orthoceratoids)
          - - Dissidocerida (paraphyletic to later orthoceratoids)
            - - Lituitida
              - - Actinocerida
                - - Pseudorthocerida
                  - Orthocerida (paraphyletic to Bactritida, Ammonoidea, and Coleoidea)

== Gallery ==
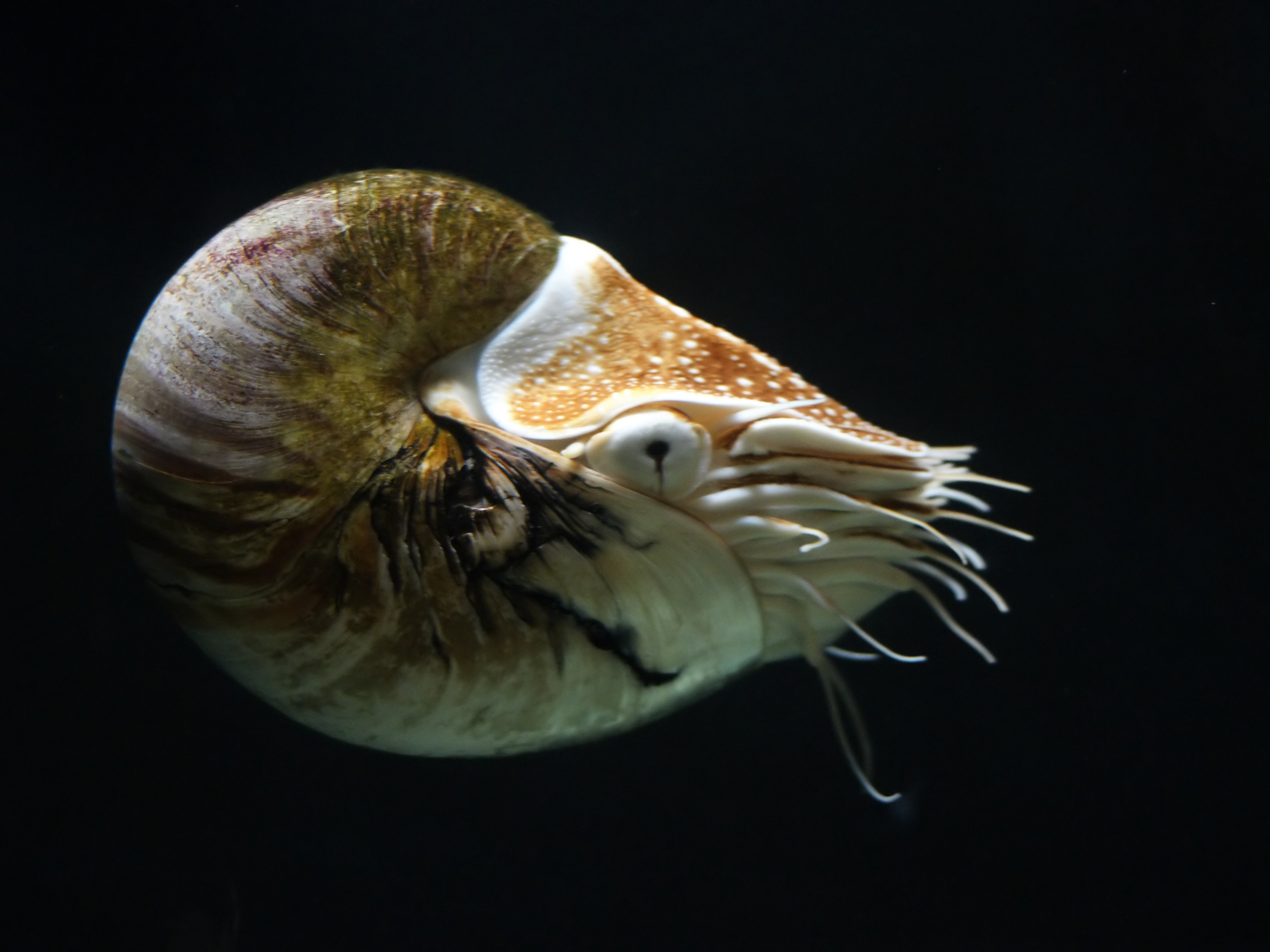
The Nautilus, one of only two surviving nautiloid genera

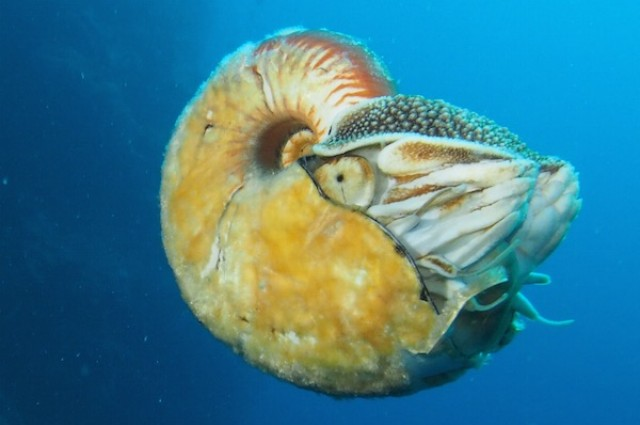
Allonautilus, the other surviving nautloid genus

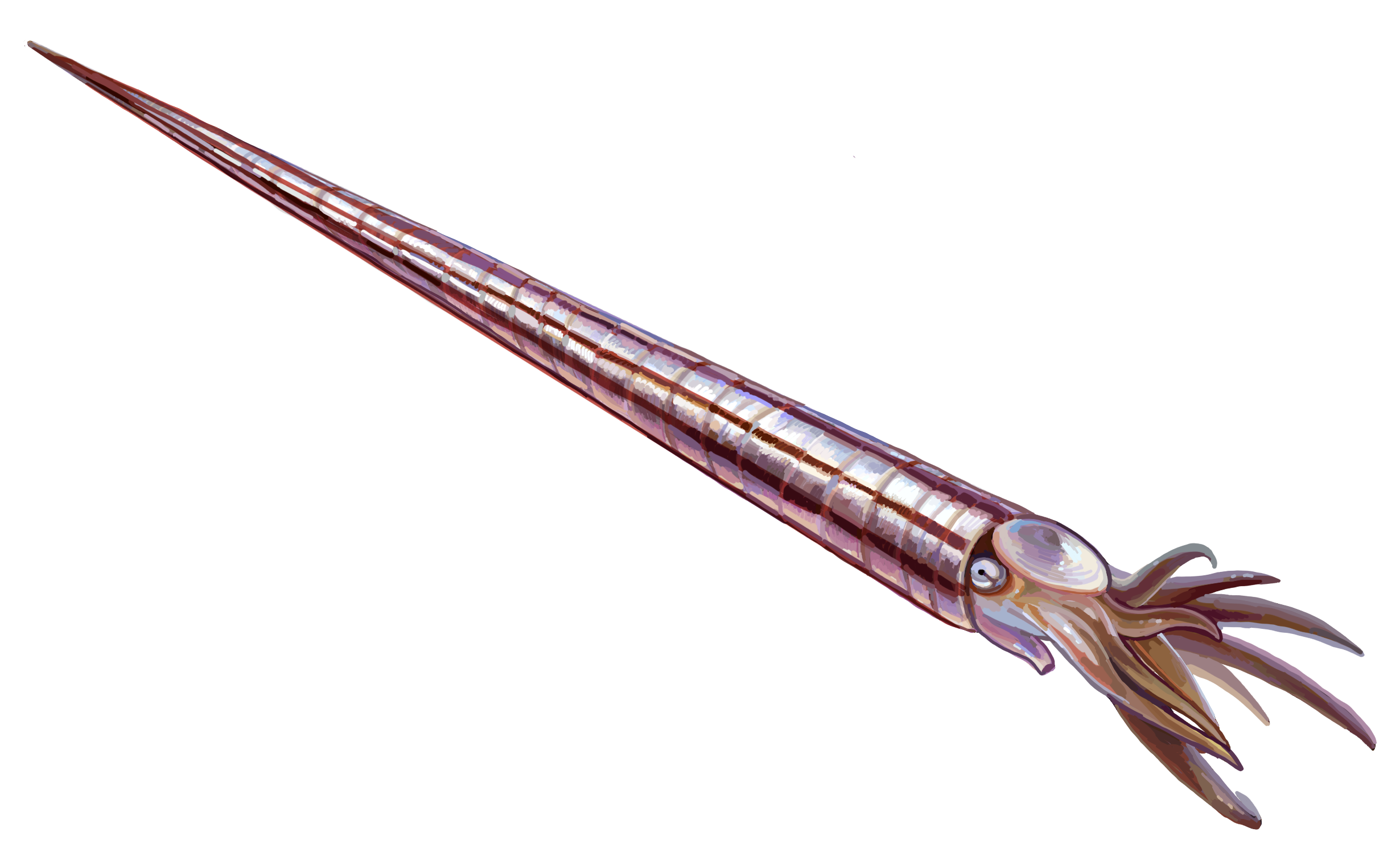
Endoceras was one of the largest nautiloids to have ever lived

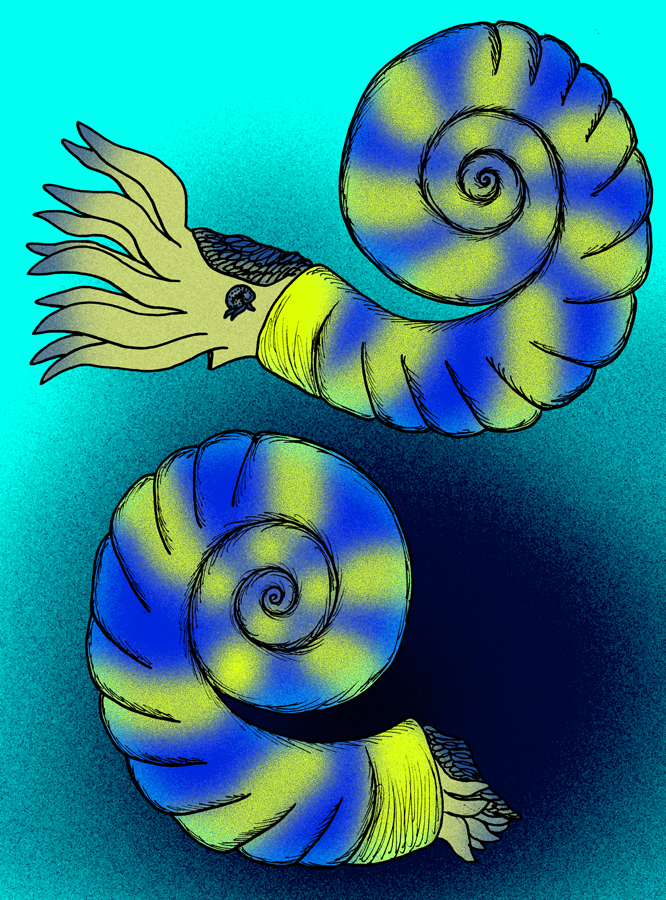
Alaskoceras was a member of the Tarphycerida, the first cephalopods to evolve coiled shells

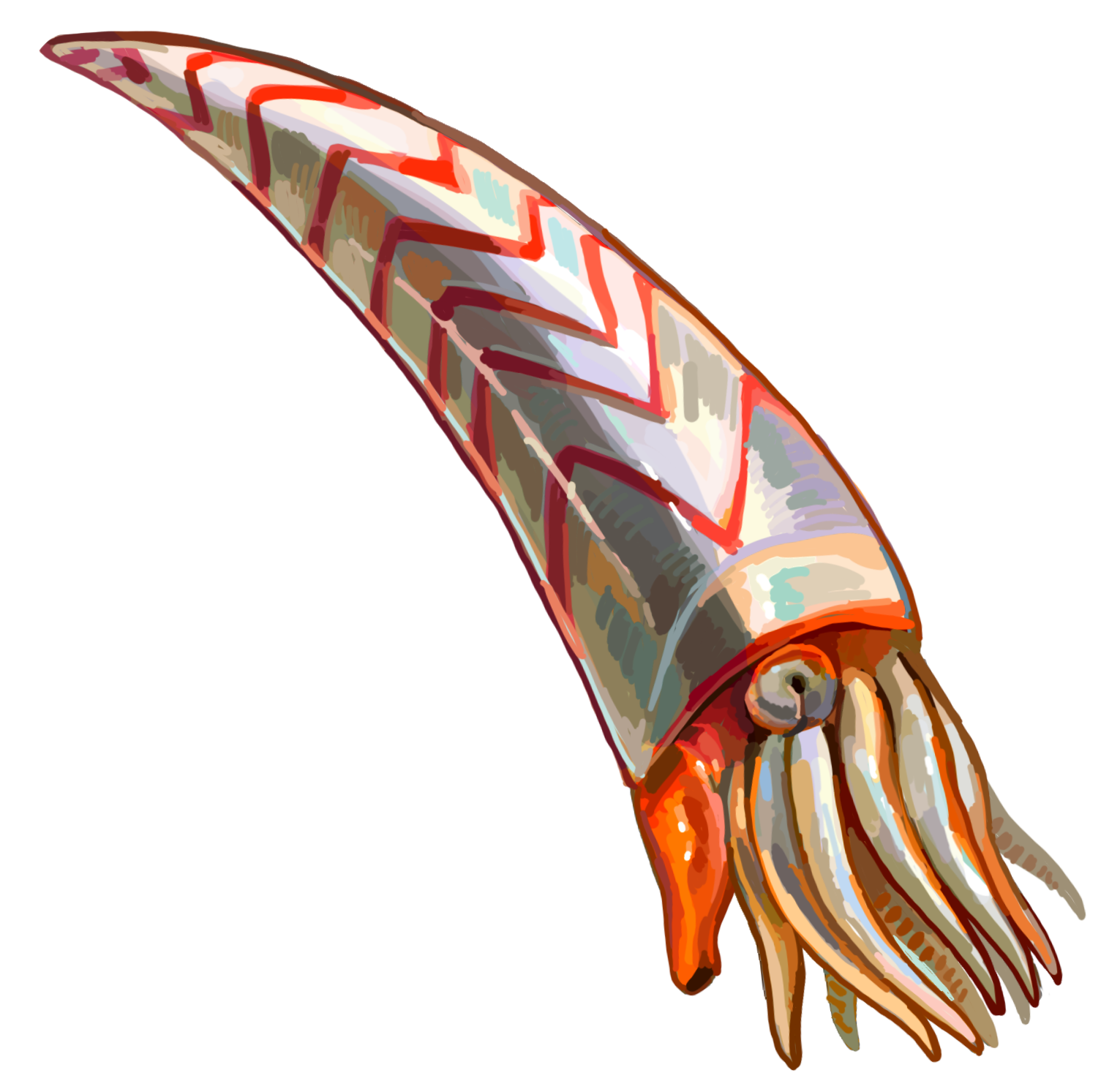
Plectronoceras was one of the earliest known nautiloids, existing in the late Cambrian

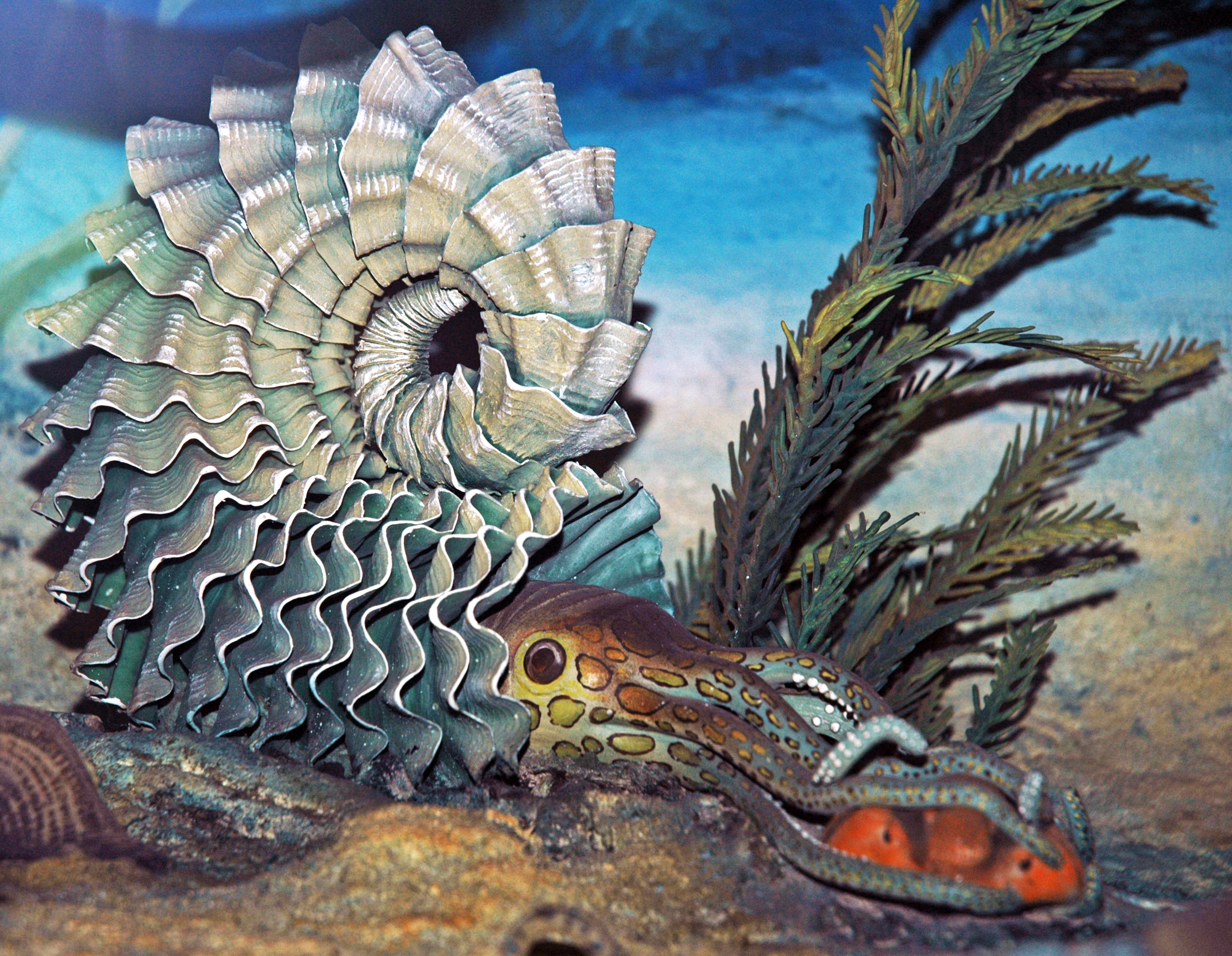
Goldringia was a Rutoceratid nautiloid from the middle Devonian of the United States

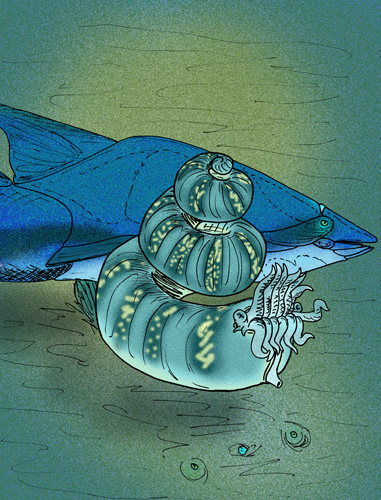
Lorieroceras was a bizarre oncocerid nautiloid from the Devonian that possessed a helically coiled shell

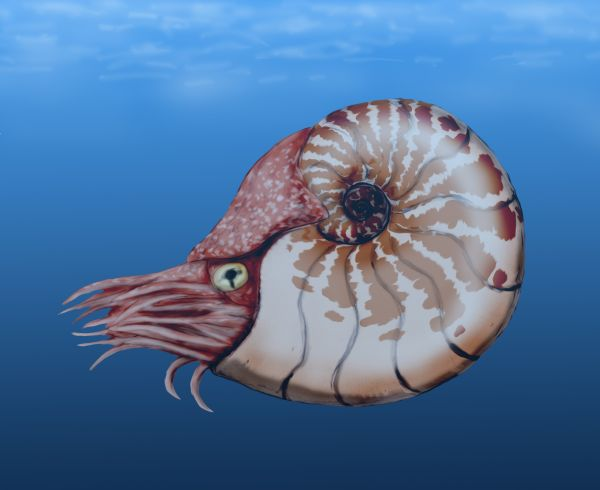
A reconstruction of the Mesozoic nautiloid Cenoceras

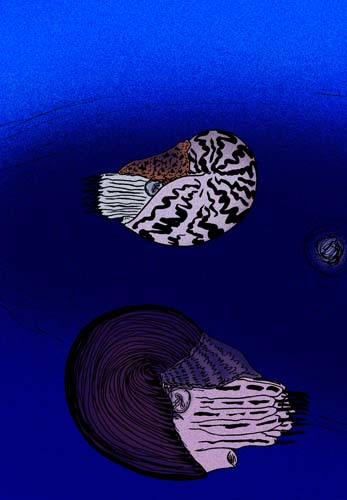
Two nautiloids from the Eocene aged Hoko River Formation, Nautilus cookanum and Aturia alabamensis

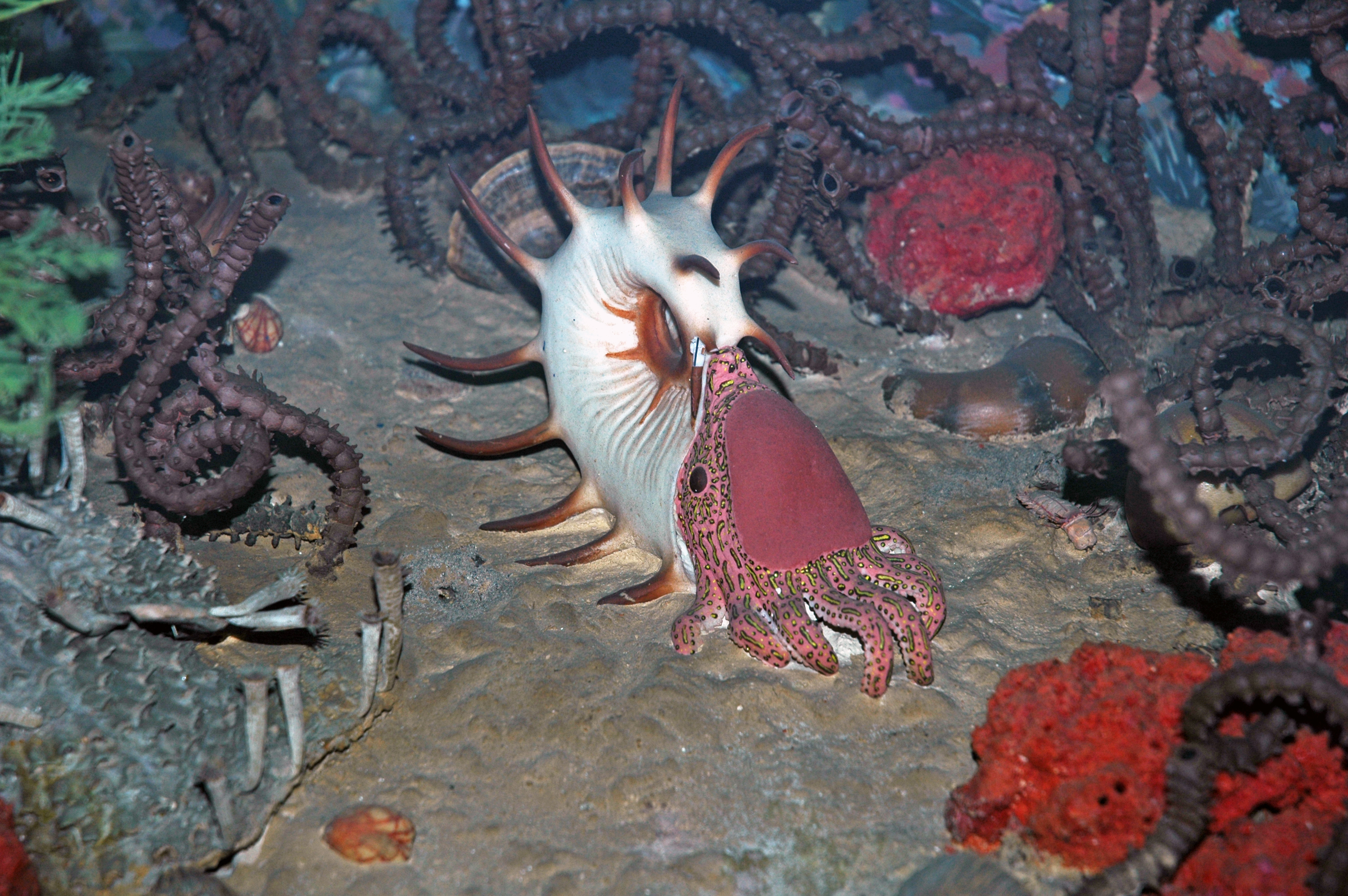
Cooperoceras was a Tainoceratid nautiloid from the Late Permian that possessed hollow recurved spines running along its shell

== See also ==
- Ammonoidea
- Belemnoidea
- Lituites
