= Orthocone =

Unusually long straight shell of a nautiloid cephalopod

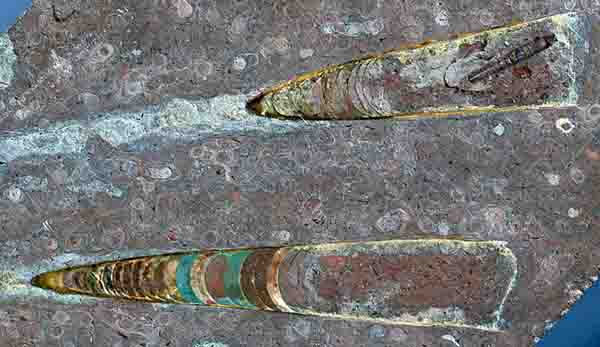
Fossilised Orthoceras orthocones.

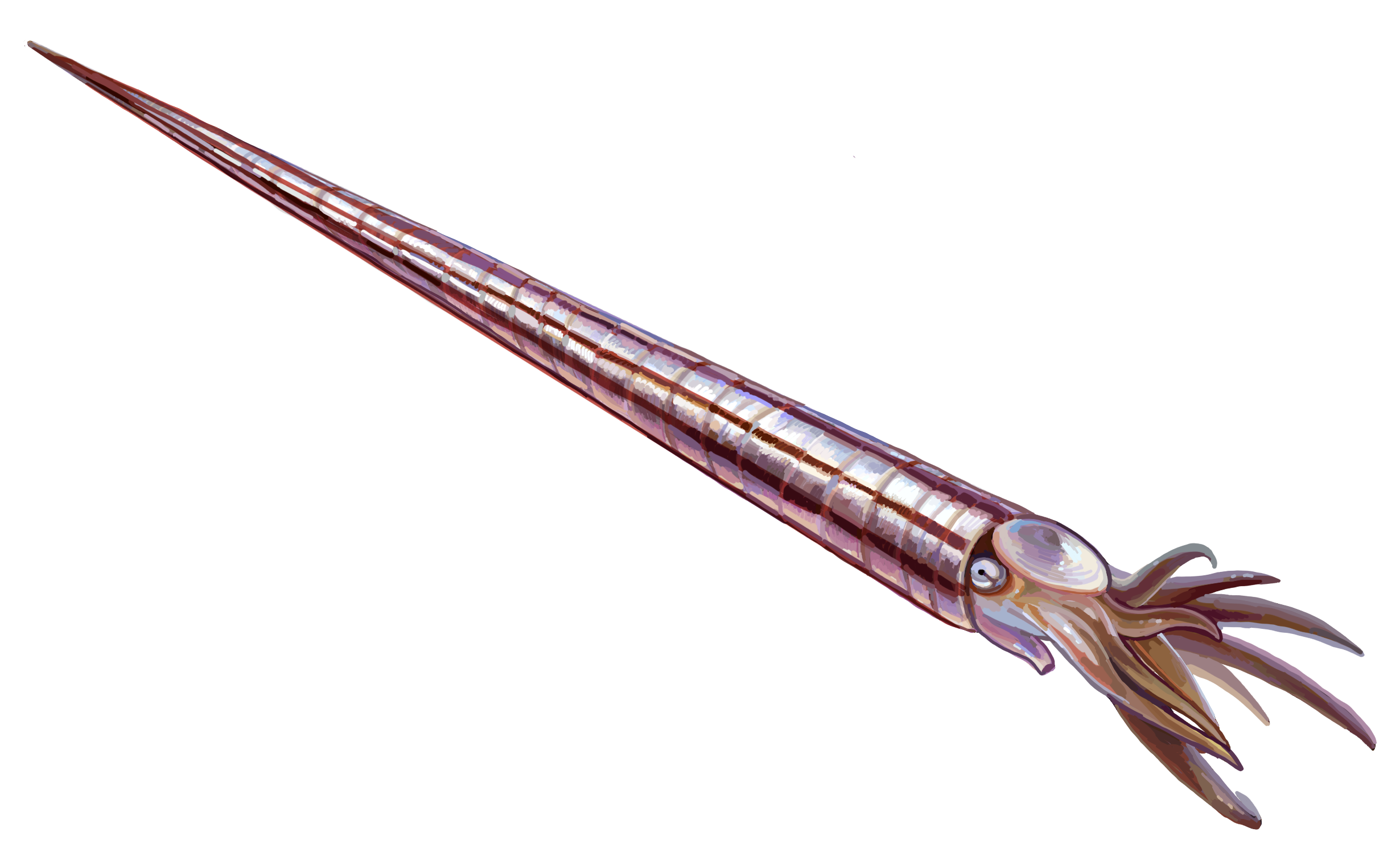
Life restoration of the orthocone nautiloid Endoceras

An orthocone is the long, cone-shaped shell belonging to several species of ancient nautiloid cephalopod—the prehistoric ancestors of today's marine cephalopod mollusks, including the cuttlefishes, nautiluses, octopuses and squids. During the 18th and 19th centuries, all such shells discovered were given the "catch-all" name Orthoceras, thus creating a wastebasket taxon. However, it is now known that many species, genera and families of nautiloids developed or retained this form of shell.

An orthocone, loosely, may be thought of as a nautiloid shell, albeit somewhat larger and with a cone-shaped, straight formation as opposed to the nautiloid's coiled, curled shape. It was previously believed that these represented the most primitive form of nautiloid, however, it is now known that the earliest nautiloids had shells that were slightly curved. An orthoconic form evolved several times among cephalopods, and, among nautiloid cephalopods, is prevalent among the ellesmerocerids, endocerids, actinocerids, orthoceratoids, and bactritids.

Orthocones existed from the Late Cambrian to the Late Triassic, but they were most common in the early Paleozoic. Revivals of the orthocone design later occurred in other cephalopod groups, notably baculitid ammonites in the Cretaceous Period. A potential Cenozoic orthocone is known in Antarcticeras, which may be a descendant of the orthoceratoids and has an orthocone-like shell that is thought to have been weakly mineralized and internal, in contrast to the external, fully-mineralized shells of earlier orthocones—an example of convergent evolution with the coleoids. However, other studies have recovered it as an oegopsid squid. Orthocone nautiloids range in size from less than 25 mm (1 in) to (in some giant endocerids of the Ordovician) 5.2 m (17 ft) long. Orthocone cephalopod fossils are known from all over the world, with particularly significant finds in Ontario, Canada and Morocco.
