= Charles Stokes (collector) =

English stockbroker, amateur scientist and art collector

Charles Stokes FGS FLS FRAS FRGS FRS FSA
- Charles Stokes by Mary Dawson Turner, engraving after Sir Francis Leggatt Chantrey (1821)
- Born: c. 1784; City of London, England
- Died: 28 December 1853 (aged 69); Camden, London, England
- Burial place: Islington, London
- Occupations: Stockbroker, man of science, art collector

Charles Stokes FGS FLS FRAS FRGS FRS FSA (c. 1784 – 28 December 1853) was a London stockbroker who gained a reputation both as an amateur scientist and as an art collector.

== Biography ==
According to the 1851 England Census, Stokes was born in the City of London, Middlesex around 1784. A baptism was recorded at St Andrew's in Holborn, City of London on 9 June 1783 for Charles Stokes, son of John Stokes and Agnes Partridge Stokes of Shoe Lane (off Fleet Street) in the City of London). Upon his death in December 1853, Stokes was widely reported to be in his 70th year (typically meaning aged 69). Stokes was also listed as age 69 when his death was recorded. He seems never to have married.

He is recorded as being a partner in the stockbroking firm of Hodges & Stokes, Threadneedle Street. Between 1835 and 1851, he is recorded as living in Gray's Inn Road, at Verulam Buildings, a housing development which had been designed for the professional classes. His clients included naturalist Charles Darwin, art critic and polymath John Ruskin, and artist J. M. W. Turner.

Although his scientific interests ranged widely, his principal ones were geology, malacology (in particular, corals and trilobites), and palaeobotany. In 1808, he was elected Fellow of the Linnean Society; in 1811, both Fellow of the Royal Geographical Society and Fellow of the Society of Antiquaries; and in 1821, Fellow of the Royal Society. Digitisation of 19th century records is incomplete; however, it is known that in 1816 and 1817 he was a secretary of the Geological Society, in 1821 a member of its Council, and at some later date its vice-president. He was also a Member of the Royal Asiatic Society, and a Fellow of the Royal Astronomical Society. In 1838, he was one of the group of eminent scientists who presented a successful petition to Parliament recommending the purchase of two important collections of fossils for the British Museum.

He collected watercolours and old master prints, but the core of his art collection was Turner. In 1853, Anna Matilda Whistler wrote that he had shown her an "extraordinary treat of Turners [sic] paintings", not equalled elsewhere, "from the artists [sic] first efforts at 16 years, to his meridian" (a metaphor for his highest mastery). (Note: Mrs Whistler may not have known of Walter Fawkes, squire of Farnley Hall near Leeds, whose collection included 6 oil paintings and more than 200 watercolours by Turner.)

His circle of acquaintance was large and distinguished, and ranged over the arts and the sciences. He knew in person or exchanged letters with: Louis Agassiz (1807–1873), Swiss-American biologist and geologist; Charles Babbage (1791–1871), British computer pioneer; George Back (1796–1878), Royal Navy officer, explorer of the Canadian Arctic, naturalist and artist; Francis Baily (1774–1844), English astronomer; Henry Wolsey Bayfield (1795–1885), Royal Navy officer and surveyor; John Bigsby (1792–1881), English physician and geologist; John Bostock (1773–1846), English physician, scientist and geologist; James Scott Bowerbank (1797–1877), British naturalist and palaeontologist; Arthur de Capell Brooke (1791–1858), British baronet and travel writer; William Broderip (1789–1859), English lawyer and naturalist; Alexandre Brongniart (1770–1847), French chemist, mineralogist, and zoologist; Robert Brown (1773–1858), Scottish botanist and palaeobotanist; William Buckland (1784–1856), English theologian, geologist and palaeontologist; Augustus Wall Callcott (1779–1844), English landscape painter; Francis Leggatt Chantrey (1781–1841), English sculptor; William Clift (1775–1849), British illustrator and conservator; Spencer Compton (1790–1851), British nobleman and patron of science and the arts; George Cumberland (1754–1848), English art collector, writer and poet; Charles Darwin (1809–1882), English naturalist, geologist and biologist; Francis Egerton (1800–1857), British politician, writer, traveller and patron of the arts; Philip Grey Egerton (1806–1881), English palaeontologist and Conservative politician; Hugh Falconer (1808–1865), Scottish geologist, botanist, palaeontologist and paleoanthropologist; Edward Forbes (1815–1854), Manx naturalist; John Franklin (1786–1847), Royal Navy officer and explorer of the Arctic; Francis Seymour Haden (1818–1910), English surgeon and etcher; James Hall (1761–1832), Scottish geologist and geophysicist; William Hamilton (1805–1867), English geologist; Thomas Hawkins (1810–1899), English fossil collector and dealer; Isaac Hays (1796–1879), American ophthalmologist, medical ethicist, and naturalist; William Hilton (1786–1839), English portrait and history painter; Charles Joseph Hullmandel (1789–1850), English lithographer; George Jones (1786–1869), British painter; Edwin Landseer (1802–1873), English painter and sculptor; Isaac Lea (1792–1886), American conchologist, geologist, and publisher; William Elford Leach (1791–1836), English zoologist and marine biologist; the Loddiges family, German-English horticulturalists; William Lonsdale (1794–1871), English geologist and palaeontologist; Charles Lyell (1797–1875), Scottish geologist; George Francis Lyon (1795–1832), Royal Navy officer and explorer; Gideon Mantell (1790–1852), English obstetrician, geologist and palaeontologist; Henri Milne-Edwards (1800–1885), French zoologist; Roderick Murchison (1792–1871), British geologist; Richard Owen (1804–1892), English biologist, comparative anatomist and palaeontologist; Edward Parry (1790–1855), Royal Navy officer was an English rear-admiral and Arctic explorer; Joseph Barclay Pentland (1797–1873), Irish geographer, natural scientist, and traveller; John Phillips (1800–1874), English geologist; David Ricardo (1772–1823), British political economist; Peter Mark Roget (1779–1869), British physician, natural theologian and lexicographer; James Ross (1800–1862), Royal Navy officer and Antarctic explorer; John Ruskin (1819–1900), English art critic and polymath; Adam Sedgwick (1785–1873), British priest and geologist; George Brettingham Sowerby (1788–1854), British naturalist, illustrator and conchologist; Edward Stanley (1779–1849), bishop of Norwich, president of the Linnean Society; Samuel Stutchbury (1798–1859), English naturalist and geologist; John Taylor (1779–1863), British mining engineer; John Vaughan Thompson (1779–1847), British military surgeon, marine biologist, zoologist and botanist; Wilhelm Gottlieb Tilesius von Tilenau (1769–1857), German naturalist and explorer, physician, draftsman and engraver; J. M. W. Turner (1775–1851), English Romantic painter, printmaker and watercolourist; William Whewell (1794–1866), English polymath, scientist, Anglican priest, philosopher, theologian and historian of science; Joseph Whidbey (1757–1833), Royal Navy explorer and engineer; Anna Matilda Whistler (1804–1881), best known as the subject of the painting Arrangement in Grey and Black No.1 ("Whistler's Mother") by James McNeill Whistler; Henry Witham (1779–1844), English researcher into the internal structure of fossil plants; and William Wollaston (1766–1828), English chemist and physicist.

He had become acquainted with Darwin before the latter embarked in 1831 on the voyage in HMS Beagle which made his name, and had asked him to collect information on Fungia, a genus of coral; which Darwin did. As a footnote to history, in 1842 Darwin thanked Stokes for the recent loan of his snuffbox.

The library of the Royal College of Music preserves several musical compositions, analyses, and collections dated between 1831 and 1847 attributed to a Charles Stokes. IMSLP has a record of a Charles Stokes, who was a composer. However, IMSLP says that that man was born in 1784 (which is consistent with other records about the scientist and art collector) and died on 14 April 1839 (which is not). It is unclear whether those two musicians were the same or different, and whether one or both may have been the man who is the subject of this article.

Lyell called Stokes "a respected member of the Stock Exchange, full of vast research in the Natural History Sciences, and remarkable for literary and antiquarian, musical and artistic, knowledge". Darwin called him "a stockbroker of repute & an old friend of mine", and (after Stokes' death) "one whom I long trusted". In his presidential address at the annual general meeting of the Geological Society on 17 February 1854, Edward Forbes said:

One of the warmest and wisest friends of the Society, and during many years an active member of it and constant attendant at its meetings, was Charles Stokes, whose name will be long borne in mind with affection and gratitude by many geologists and naturalists. Although constantly and assiduously engaged in business, Mr. Stokes contrived, whilst passing his days in the City and on the Stock Exchange, of which he was a most respected member, to acquire a vast amount of minute and accurate scientific information, and to pursue original, though, alas, too seldom published researches; and there was scarcely any department of the natural history sciences with which his acquaintance was not considerable. Careless of fame and brimful of benevolence, he laboured incessantly, whenever a moment of leisure permitted, to advance science by every means that lay within his power. He collected rare and interesting specimens at any cost, not for their own sakes, but to place at the disposal of any competent person who had the requisite knowledge and determination to investigate the subjects they could serve to elucidate. Before microscopic science was in fashion, he was at work encouraging the makers of microscopes, suggesting improvements, purchasing beautiful instruments, and testing their application. When lithography was in its infancy in England, he foresaw what could be done with the rising art; and, sparing no expense, found a zealous and talented ally in the late Mr. Hullmandel for experimenting on his suggestions. His knowledge of some branches of zoology and palaeontology was minute and curious, as well as of parts of botany. Trilobites and Zoophytes were among his favourite subjects; upon the former he communicated valuable materials and information to the great work of Alexander Brongniart on the Fossil Crustacea; about the latter he possessed a store of novel and original information, which I fear is in great part lost with him. The subject of the fossilization of wood was one which he pursued even to the last; and only two months before his death I received a letter from him, accompanying some specimens illustrative of his views, and inquiring about others. In the 5th volume of the 2nd series of our Transactions is published a valuable paper by him on this subject, containing an explanation of the phaenomena exhibited by partially silicified wood, and of the progressive steps in the process of petrifaction. In the same volume is a memoir upon "Some Species of Orthocerata," with an account of the siphon of Actinoceras and the foundation of the genus Ormoceras. The many curious researches concerning the Orthoceratites that have interested palaeontologists of late years had their origin in his discoveries. Some time before he had made mineralogical communications to the Society. His name is constantly cited in numerous foreign treatises. But the scantiness of his writings can give no true notion of his learning and his influence on the progress of science during his time. Not an expedition started for foreign discovery, but he was in at the commencement to advise and direct the natural history arrangements. I am one of many who owe much to the sound sense and surprising knowledge of Charles Stokes. He was the Ellis of our times. I have spoken only of his scientific learning; he was as remarkable for literary, antiquarian, musical, and artistic knowledge. He died in London, deeply regretted, in the last week of December 1853, at the age of 70. His pleasant and wise presence will be missed for many a year.

In an address to the Royal Geographical Society on 22 May 1854, the Earl of Ellesmere, its then President, said:

In Mr. Charles Stokes science has lost one of its most enlightened promoters, there being few of its branches with which he was not well acquainted. Passing by his solid researches in geology, mineralogy, palæontology, and botany. and his warm encouragement of drawing, painting, and music. let me say that he was one of the earliest patrons of lithography in our country, and that he spared no expense to enable the first experimenters in that art to attain successful results. Again, he was the true friend of the explorers of distant lands or seas, numbers of whom can testify that his advice was of the highest value to them. Though scarcely a traveller beyond the British Isles, he had mastered several languages; and being in constant correspondence with eminent foreigners, was held in high repute by them. If he published little, he has secured for his memory a lasting tribute from a distinguished younger contemporary, Professor Edward Forbes, who has declared that "he was one of the 'many' who owed much to the sound sense and surprising knowledge of Mr. Charles Stokes, a man as careless of fame as he was brimful of benevolence".

In May and June 1854, Sotheby's sold off Stokes' library and his scientific collections in separate dedicated auctions; which suggests that both were of substantial size. It is unclear what became of his art collection; but it is known that some of his Turner watercolours passed to his niece, Hannah Smith; because Ruskin bought ten of them from her in 1858. (Note: 10 watercolours, at 50 guineas each; a total of £525. As of 2018, that equates to something between £50,000 and £1.5M.) In November 1854, the Royal Society did no more than note the fact that Stokes had died.

== Taxa described ==
He described the following taxa:

- Actinoceras bigsbii, A. lyonii and A. simmsii (Stokes 1840), three species of extinct cephalopods in genus Actinoceras
- Asaphus platycephalus (Stokes 1824), an extinct species of trilobite in genus Asaphus
- Caryophyllia smithii (Stokes & Broderip 1828), a species of solitary coral
- Huronia (Stokes 1824), an extinct genus of cephalopods
- Ormoceras {Stokes 1840), an extinct genus of cephalopods

In a letter of 1846 to Royal Navy Captain Sir James Ross, Stokes described two species which Ross had dredged from Antarctic waters: Hornera lateralis (genus Hornera, a Bryozoan, in family Horneridae, in suborder Cancellata); and Primnoa rossii (genus Primnoa, a soft coral). However, it seems that neither description was ever formally published, and that neither name was ever accepted. It is unclear as to what those species (which may or may not have been elsewhere described and named) might be.

== Taxa named in honour ==
It has long been customary for zoologists when describing a new taxon to explain why they have chosen a name for a genus or an epithet for a species. (Note: Usually, but not always, in honour of people they admired.) Several species with the epithet stokesi or stokesii may have been named in honour of Charles Stokes. All the species listed in this section were described by his contemporaries, often by people who he is known to have known, and all were within his areas of interest. (Note: As of 2018, none of the relevant papers (except the one about H. stokesii) seems to have been digitised.) In every case, it would be necessary to consult the original scientific papers to be sure. (Note: Caution is required. In botany, such epithets may be in honour of Jonathan Stokes (c. 1755-1831), English physician and botanist; in 20th century paleontology, of William Lee Stokes (1915-1994), American geologist.)

This attribution is certain:

- Hemicidaris stokesii (Wright 1857), an extinct sea urchin in genus Hemicidaris

These attributions seem plausible:

- Acinophyllum stokesi (Milne-Edwards & Haime 1851 = Columnaria stokesi Milne-Edwards & Haime not 1906, Diphyphyllum stokesi Milne-Edwards & Haime not 1897, Lithostrotion stokesi Milne-Edwards & Haime 1858), Palaeophyllum stokesi Milne-Edwards & Haime 1851) (Note: "Not <date>" means that an alleged publication date has been challenged on the grounds that it was outside the supposed authors' lifetimes; here, long after their deaths.)
- Dichocoenia stokesi (Milne-Edwards & Haime 1848), a stony coral
- Goniopora stokesi (Milne-Edwards & Haime 1851), a colonial stony coral
- Mellitella stokesii (Agassiz 1841 = Echinoglycus stokesii Agassiz 1841, Encope stokesii Agassiz 1841, Mellita stokesii Agassiz 1841), a sea urchin in genus Mellitella in family Mellitidae in suborder Scutellina in order Clypeasteroida
- Notopocorystes stokesii (Mantell 1844 = Corystes stokesii, Palaeocorystes stokesii), an extinct crab in genus Notopocorystes in family Raninidae
- Phacops stokesii (Milne-Edwards 1851 ?= Calymene macrophthalama Murchison), a trilobite; assigned both to Phacops and to Calymene, genus uncertain
- Platytrochus stokesii (Milne-Edwards & Haime 1848 = Turbiniola stokesii Lea 1833)), an extinct stony coral
- Proetus stokesi (Murchison n.d.), a trilobite (Note: Nom. dub., possibly a misnomer for Proetus stokesii. See also Warburgella stokesii.)
- Proetus stokesii (Murchison 1839 = Asaphus stokesii Murchison 1839, Forbesia stokesii M'Coy 1855), a trilobite
- Trigonotreta stokesi (Koenig 1825 = Spirifer stokesii, Spiriferina stokesi), an extinct articulate brachiopod
- Warburgella stokesii (Murchison 1839 ?=Proetus stokesi Reed n.d.), a trilobite
- Zaphrentis stokesi (Milne-Edwards & Haime 1851), an extinct coral in genus Zaphrentis possibly in order Rugosa

== Places named in honour ==
In 1826, Royal Navy captain and explorer John Franklin named Point Stokes (69°20′27.5″N 138°45′8.7″W), a headland in Yukon in the Arctic Sea, in Stokes' honour.

It is not clear why Stokes Mountain and Stokes Range in Nunavut, Canada were so named. They may or may not have been named in honour of Charles Stokes.

== Publications ==
- Stokes, Charles (1824). "Notice Accompanying Specimens of Lead Ore, Found in Toadstone, from near Matlock, Derbyshire". Transactions of the Geological Society. 2nd. 1. Read 3 December 1820: 163.
- Stokes, Charles (1824). "Notice on a Recent Deposit of Compact Limestone". Transactions of the Geological Society. 2nd. 1. Read 15 December 1820: 166.
- Stokes, Charles; Mantell, Gideon Algernon (1824). "Some Fossil Vegetables of the Tilgate Forest, in Sussex". Transactions of the Geological Society of London. 1: 421–424.
- Stokes, Charles (1828). "Extract of a Letter from Charles Stokes to William John Broderip, Explanatory of Three Drawings of Echini". Transactions of the Geological Society. 2nd. 2. Read 20 June 1829: 406.
- Stokes, Charles (1835–1836). "Notice Respecting a Piece of Limestone Partly Petrified by Carbonate of Lime: With Some Remarks on Fossil Woods, Which It Has Suggested". Proceedings of the Geological Society of London. II (46): 418.
- Stokes, Charles (1838). "On Some Species of Orthocerata". Proceedings of the Geological Society of London. 2: 688–690.
- Stokes, Charles (1838). "Further Notice on a Partially Petrified Piece of Wood from an Ancient Roman Aqueduct at Eilsen, in the Principality of Lippe-Buckeberg". Proceedings of the Geological Society of London. 2.
- Stokes, Charles (1840). "XLIV.—On Some Species of Orthocerata". Transactions of the Geological Society of London. 2nd. 5 (3): 705–714. doi:10.1144/transgslb.5.3.705. S2CID 128544794.
