= Actinoceratidae =

Actinoceratidae Temporal range: Middle Ordovician - Lower Silurian

Scientific classification
- Domain: Eukaryota
- Kingdom: Animalia
- Phylum: Mollusca
- Class: Cephalopoda
- Subclass: Nautiloidea
- Order: †Actinocerida
- Family: †Actinoceratidae; Saemann (1853)

Genera
- See text

Extinct family of molluscs

The Actinoceriatidae are a family of actinocerids named by Saemann in 1853 for those that grew to have large shells with blunt apices and large siphuncles with widely expanded segments and a generally arcuate endosiphucular canal system. Their range is from the upper Middle Ordovician to the Lower Silurian. Actinocerids are generally straight-shelled nautiloid cephalopods with a siphuncle composed of expanded segments, typically with thin connecting rings, in which the internal deposits are penetrated by a system of canals.

Actinoceratids are derived from Wutinoceras, possibly through an early Armenoceras or through Nybyoceras and give rise to Lambeoceras and to the Huroniidae.

Seven genera are included in the Actinoceratidae, Actinoceras, Floweroceras, Kochoceras, Leurorthoceras, Paractinoceras, Saffordoceras, and Troostoceras. Actinoceras is the earliest but with a range that carries it into the Lower Silurian. Troostoceras followed by Saffordoceras are later Middle Ordovician genera related to early Actinoceras. Kochoceras followed by Floweroceras are Upper Ordovian genera related to later Actinoceras. Leurothoceras and Paractinoceras, both from the Upper Ordovician, are shown to have their source in Middle Ordovician actinoceratids.

Paractinoceras is probably the most distinct actinoceratid from Actinoceras. Paractinoceras has a long, straight, slender shell and a siphuncle that starts off like that in Actinoceras, but becomes narrow like that in Ormoceras in the anterior part of the phragmocone. Kochoceras has a large blunt shell that expands more rapidly than Actinoceras and is strongly flattened on the ventral side causing possible confusion with Lambeoceras to casual observation. Floweroceras is doubtfully distinct from Kochoceras.

Leurothoceras is synonymous with Actinoceras; Saffordoceras and Troostoceras are closely related.
