= Saffordoceras =

Saffordoceras Temporal range: Middle Ordovician

Scientific classification
- Domain: Eukaryota
- Kingdom: Animalia
- Phylum: Mollusca
- Class: Cephalopoda
- Subclass: Nautiloidea
- Order: †Actinocerida
- Family: †Actinoceratidae
- Genus: †Saffordoceras; Foerste and Teichert, 1930

Extinct genus of nautiloids

Saffordoceras is an actinoceratid from the Middle Ordovician, found in eastern North America, characterized by a flattened venter; sutures with broad, deep ventral lobes and narrow lateral saddles; and subventral siphuncle with segments decreasing from about 0.3 to less than 0.2 the shell diameter. Saffordoceras is probably derived from Actinoceras. Related contemporary genera include Paractinoceras and Troostoceras
