= Troostoceras =

Troostoceras Temporal range: Middle Ordovician

Scientific classification
- Domain: Eukaryota
- Kingdom: Animalia
- Phylum: Mollusca
- Class: Cephalopoda
- Subclass: Nautiloidea
- Order: †Actinocerida
- Family: †Actinoceratidae
- Genus: †Troostoceras; Foeste & Teichert, 1930

Extinct genus of molluscs

Troostoceras is a genus of actinoceratid nautiloids with a cyrtoconic shell, otherwise similar to Actinoceras. The shell is slightly endogastric, curved such that the under or ventral side is longitudinally concave, tucked in. The siphuncle is ventral and is in contact with the shell wall. Segments begin small but expand during growth.

Troostoceras has been found in the Middle Ordovician of eastern North America and Siberia and may be a variety of Actinoceras, along with Saffordoceras and Leurorthoceras.
