= Paractinoceras =

Paractinoceras Temporal range: Middle Ordovician

Scientific classification
- Domain: Eukaryota
- Kingdom: Animalia
- Phylum: Mollusca
- Class: Cephalopoda
- Subclass: Nautiloidea
- Order: †Actinocerida
- Family: †Actinoceratidae
- Genus: †Paractinoceras; Hyatt in Zittle, 1900

Extinct genus of molluscs

Paractinoceras is a genus of long, straight, and slender actinocerid nautiloid with siphuncular segments in the early stages like those of Actinoceras, becoming narrower in the later stages of the chambered phragmocone like those in Ormoceras. As with Kochoceras and Floweroceras, Paractinoceras is considered a separate genus within the Actinoceratidae, distinct from Actinoceras.
