= Megadisocosorus =

Megadisocosorus Temporal range: Middle Silurian

Scientific classification
- Kingdom: Animalia
- Phylum: Mollusca
- Class: Cephalopoda
- Subclass: Nautiloidea
- Order: †Actinocerida
- Family: †Armenoceratidae
- Genus: †Megadisocosorus; Foeste, 1925

Extinct genus of molluscs

Megadisocosorus is a genus of actinocerid cephalopods similar to Armenoceras but with a short, slightly curved, breviconic shell. The siphuncle is in contact with the ventral wall, unlike that of Armenoceras in which the siphuncle is close to the center.

Megadisocosorus is known from the Middle Silurian of North America. According to Teichert, 1964, Megadisocosorus is a member of one of the two branches of the Armenoceratidae that also includes Nybyoceras and Selkirkoceras.
