= Cyrtonybyoceras =

Cyrtonybyoceras Temporal range: eM Ordovician

Scientific classification
- Kingdom: Animalia
- Phylum: Mollusca
- Class: Cephalopoda
- Subclass: Nautiloidea
- Order: †Actinocerida
- Family: †Wutinoceratidae
- Genus: †Cyrtonybyoceras; Teichert, 1933

Extinct genus of molluscs

Cyrtonybyoceras is a genus of slightly exogastric members of the Wutinoceratidae, a family of actinocerids and probably derived from an earlier Wutinoceras . The shell of Cyrtonybyoceras is curved slightly upwardly and is slightly compressed. Sutures slope toward the aperture, from the dorsum to the venter. The siphuncle is ventral but not marginal, in general form like that of Nybyoceras. Upper and lower septal necks are recumbent or narrowly free. The canal system is reticular, characteristic of the Wutinoceratidae.

Cyrtonybyoceras and Wutinoceras are similar, except for Cyrtonybyoceras being slightly cyrtoconic, and almost intergrade.

Cyrtonybyoceras is so far known only from the Whiterock Stage in North America. The genotype, Cyrtonybyoceras haesitans, was named by Teichert in 1933, based on Orthoceras haesitans Billings 1865, from the Tablehead formation in Newfoundland. It has also been found in the Antelope Valley Limestone in the Toquima Range in Nevada.
