= Wutinoceratidae =

Wutinoceratidae Temporal range: Middle Ordovician (Whiterockian)

Scientific classification
- Domain: Eukaryota
- Kingdom: Animalia
- Phylum: Mollusca
- Class: Cephalopoda
- Subclass: Nautiloidea
- Order: †Actinocerida
- Family: †Wutinoceratidae; Shimazu & Obata, 1938

Genera
- Adamsoceras; Cyrtonybyoceras; Wutinoceras

Extinct family of nautiloids

The Wutinoceratidae are a family of early actinocerids defined by Shimazu and Obata in 1938 for actinocerids with thick connecting rings and a complex irregular canal system. Actinocerids are generally straight shelled nautiloid cephalopods with a siphuncle composed of expanded segments, typically with thin connecting rings, in which the internal deposits are penetrated by a system of canals.

The Wutinoceratidae include three genera, Wutinoceras, Cyrtonybyoceras, and Adamsoceras, known especially from the early Middle Ordovician (Whiterock stage) in northeastern China and North America, but found also from the same age in Australia and northern Europe. Wutinoceras is the earliest and gave rise to Cyrtonybyoceras and Adamsoceras. Cyrtonybyoceras left no descendants, but Adamsoceras gave rise to the Ormoceratidae. Wutinoceras, further on, gave rise to the Armenoceratidae and possibly to the immediate ancestors of Actinoceras.
