= Huronia (cephalopod) =

Huronia Temporal range: UpperOrdovician -Silurian

Scientific classification
- Domain: Eukaryota
- Kingdom: Animalia
- Phylum: Mollusca
- Class: Cephalopoda
- Subclass: Nautiloidea
- Order: †Actinocerida
- Family: †Huroniidae
- Genus: †Huronia; Stokes (1824)

Extinct genus of molluscs

Huronia is an actinocerid genus included in the Huroniidae along with Discoactinoceras and Huroniella,(Teichert 1964). Huronia is characterized by long siphuncle segments with the free part of the connecting rings only slightly inflated and by a narrow central canal and strongly curved radial canals located in the anterior part of each siphuncle segment

== Ancestry ==
Teichert, (1964) indicated Huronia as being derived from the upper Middle Ordovician Discoactinoceras, whose ancestry lay in the direction of Polydesmia, once considered the prototypical actinocerid. Flower, (1968) on the other hand, showed that Huronia is derived from Actinoceras and split off from Lambeoceras during Red River time, near the start of the Late Ordovician, precluding the inclusion of Discoactinoceras

== Distribution ==
Huronia is known from the Upper Ordovician and Silurian of North America and Greenland. H. arctica and H occidentalis(?) are associated with the Cape Calhoun fauna in Greenland.(Flower 1957) H paulodolata and H munuens come from the Middle Silurian of Michigan (Teichert 1964) H sepata is found in the Shamattawa limestone of Hudson Bay (Flower 1957)
