= Selkirkoceras =

Selkirkoceras Temporal range: Middle Ordovician

Scientific classification
- Kingdom: Animalia
- Phylum: Mollusca
- Class: Cephalopoda
- Subclass: Nautiloidea
- Order: †Actinocerida
- Family: †Armenoceratidae
- Genus: †Selkirkoceras; Foeste, 1929

Extinct genus of molluscs

Selkirkoceras is a genus of armonoceratid cephalopods similar to Kochoceras of the Actinoceratidae, but with recumbent septal necks. The first siphuncular segment is large, broad, and blunt.

Selkirkoceras, which is known from the Middle Ordovician of western North America, is included in the Nybyoceras branch of the Armenoceratidae (Teichert, 1964), which also includes Nybyoceras and Megadisocosorus.
