= Hornera =

Hornera may refer to:

- Hornera (bryozoan), a genus of bryozoans in the family Horneridae
- Hornera, a genus of plants in the family Lauraceae, synonym of Neolitsea
- Hornera, a genus of plants in the family Fabaceae, synonym of Mucuna
