= Monocyrtoceras =

Monocyrtoceras Temporal range: Middle Silurian

Scientific classification
- Domain: Eukaryota
- Kingdom: Animalia
- Phylum: Mollusca
- Class: Cephalopoda
- Subclass: Nautiloidea
- Order: †Actinocerida
- Family: †Armenoceratidae
- Genus: †Monocyrtoceras; Foeste, 1924

Extinct organism

Monocyrtoceras is a genus of armenoceratids (Cephalopoda) from the Middle Silurian of North America (Wisconsin), with a gently curved shell and a siphuncle like that of Elrodoceras.

According to Teichert, 1964, in the Treatise part K, Monocyrtoceras along with Elrodoceras and Armenoceras forms one of the two branches of the Armenoceratidae.
