= Elrodoceras =

Elrodoceras Temporal range: Middle Silurian

Scientific classification
- Kingdom: Animalia
- Phylum: Mollusca
- Class: Cephalopoda
- Subclass: Nautiloidea
- Order: †Actinocerida
- Family: †Armenoceratidae
- Genus: †Elrodoceras; Foeste, 1918

Extinct genus of molluscs

Elrodoceras is a genus of armenoceratids, (Cephalopoda, Actinocerida), that grew fairly large, characterized by a straight shell, slightly curved at the apex, a siphuncle narrower than that of Armenoceras but with segments still wider than long, and an arched endosiphuncular canal system.

Elrodoceras, which comes from the Middle Silurian of North America and Europe, is a late armenoceratid and, according to Curt Teichert, 1964, a member of one of the two branches of the Armenoceratidae that also includes Armenoceras and Monocyrtoceras.
