= Kochoceras =

Kochoceras Temporal range: Middle Ordovician

Scientific classification
- Domain: Eukaryota
- Kingdom: Animalia
- Phylum: Mollusca
- Class: Cephalopoda
- Subclass: Nautiloidea
- Order: †Actinocerida
- Family: †Actinoceratidae
- Genus: †Kochoceras; Troedsson, 1926

Extinct genus of nautiloids

Kochoceras is an extinct nautiloid genus from the later Ordovician belonging to the family Actinoceratidae and found in North America.

== Morphology ==
Kochoceras is relatively short, breviconic, and grew to be fairly large with a shell more rapidly expanding than in Actinoceras. The ventral, or under, side is strongly flattened with prominent lobes that may give the impression of Lambeoceras. However septa in Kochoceras are more widely spaced and the siphuncle, which is proportionally very large, is in broad contact with the ventral wall. The siphucle in Lambeoceras is proportionally much smaller and is removed about one diameter from the ventral wall. The diameter of the siphuncle in the apical part of Kochoceras is 3/4 or more that of the shell.

The siphuncle of Kochoceras is similar to that of Actinoceras, the main difference between the two being that Kochoceras is breviconic (short) and has a narrow stratigraphic range, while Actinoceras is longiconic, lengthy, and has a stratigraphic range that extends through the Middle- and Upper Ordovician.

== Derivation & taxonomy ==
Kochoceras and Lambeoceras are both derived from Actinoceras. The two split from each other soon after having split from Actinoceras. Kochoceras is more conservative and remained in the Actinoceratidae while Lambeoceras evolved further and is the sole representative of the Lambeoceratidae.
