= Leurorthoceras =

Leurorthoceras Temporal range: Middle Ordovician

Scientific classification
- Domain: Eukaryota
- Kingdom: Animalia
- Phylum: Mollusca
- Class: Cephalopoda
- Subclass: Nautiloidea
- Order: †Actinocerida
- Family: †Actinoceratidae
- Genus: †Leurorthoceras; Foeste, 1921

Extinct genus of molluscs

Leurorthoceras is a genus of flattened actinoceratids with a siphuncle narrower than in Actinoceras, segments of which tend to become longer in the mature parts of the phragmocone, the chambered part of the shell. This fossil is known from the Middle Ordovician of North America, Europe, and Siberia.
