= Lambeoceras =

Lambeoceras Temporal range: Upper Ordovician

Scientific classification
- Kingdom: Animalia
- Phylum: Mollusca
- Class: Cephalopoda
- Subclass: Nautiloidea
- Order: †Actinocerida
- Family: †Lambeoceratidae; Flower, 1957
- Genus: †Lambeoceras; Foeste, 1917

Extinct genus of molluscs

Lambeoceras is an extinct genus of large actinocerids with a convexly lenticular cross section from Upper Ordovician-aged marine deposits of North America and the sole representative of the family Lambeoceratidae.

== Morphological description ==
Lambeoceras is of medium to moderately large size with a long, straight, depressed shell, broad in cross section with the dorsum and venter both about equally convex, meeting acutely along the sides. Chambers are short, and septa are closely spaced, forming broad lobes on the upper and lower sides, which meet in sharp saddles along the sides. The siphuncle is submarginal, near the ventral side and relatively narrow. Septal necks are extremely long, brims short and recumbent. Segments are broadly expanded, connecting rings thin. Radial canals within the siphuncle from broad arcs that may bifurcate close to the parispatium.

== Derivation and phylogeny ==
Lambeoceras is derived from the same stock in Actinoceras that produced Kochoceras according to Flower (1968), although consideration had been given to Armenoceras in Flower (1957). Teichert (1964) on the other hand, in the Treatise, thought that Lambeoceras was derived from Gonioceras and included it in the Gonioceratidae. Kochoceras differs from Lambeoceras in having a flattened venter and a siphuncle that rests on the ventral side and is closely allied with Actinoceras (Flower 1957)

== Distribution ==
Lambeoceras is found with Actinoceras, Armenoceras, and Nybyoceras in the Second Value Formation in New Mexico; with Armenoceras and Selkirkoceras in the Burnam Limestone in central Texas; with Actinoceras, Paractinoceras, and Kochoceras in the Lander Sandstone in Wyoming, and with Armenoceras. Actinoceras, and Selkirkoceras in the overlying dolomite – all of Red River age, marking the transition between the Middle and Upper Ordovician. Lambeoceras is also found with Actinoceras in the Dog Head member of the Red River Series in Manitoba and with Actinoceras and Kochoceras in the Mt. Silliman beds on Baffin Island.

== Paleoecology ==
While the earlier Gonioceras no doubt rested on the sea floor in ambush, perhaps half buried or more in sediment, Lambeoceras may have more actively hunted in the water close to but above. On the other hand, Lambeoceras ' shape may have had more to do with stabilization in shallow surge ridden waters than with hunting methods.
