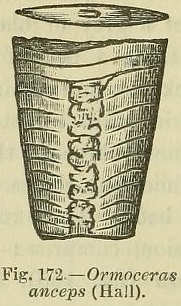
- Ormoceras anceps

Scientific classification
- Kingdom: Animalia
- Phylum: Mollusca
- Class: Cephalopoda
- Subclass: Nautiloidea
- Order: †Actinocerida
- Family: †Ormoceratidae
- Genus: †Ormoceras; Stokes, 1840

Species
- See text

= Ormoceras =

Ormoceras Temporal range: Ordovician–Devonian

Extinct genus of molluscs

Ormoceras is an actinocerid nautiloid genus and type for the family Ormoceratidae, found in North America from the late Chazyan through the early Cincinnatian of the Middle and Upper Ordovician, but which continued through the Devonian worldwide.

Ormoceras is a characterized by its straight shell, more or less circular in cross section, and a relatively narrow subcentral siphuncle composed of globular segments in which the radial canals in the endosiphuncular canal system are straight and normal to the central canal. Septal necks are short, narrowly rounded or sharply recurved, but never recumbent. As with most actinocerids, cameral deposits are common.

Ormoceras is derived from Adamsoceras which has a siphuncle with the same general form but in which the canal system is reticulate as in Wutinoceras. Ormoceras gave rise to Deiroceras early on during the Mohawkian (Middle Ordovician) and slightly later to Troedssonoceras. Ormoceras also gave rise to later genera such as Metarmenoceras from the Lower Devonian of Quebec, either directly or through Cyrtactinoceras of the Silurian, once thought to have given rise to the Carboniferous Carbactinoceratidae.

== Named species ==
Ormoceras contains twelve named species:

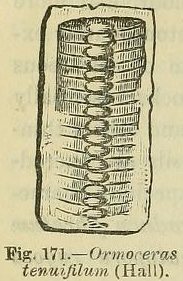
Ormoceras tenuifilum

- O.boreale
- O.centrale
- O.dobrovljanensis
- O.ferecentricum
- O.koraiense
- O.langskawiense
- O.manchuriense
- O.nanumforme
- O.pollacki
- O.schohariae
- O.tenuifilum
- O.yokoyamai
