= Thomas Hawkins (geologist) =

English collector of fossils

Thomas Hawkins (22 July 1810 – 15 October 1889) was an English fossil collector and dealer, especially of Ichthyosaurs and Plesiosaurs.

He lived in Glastonbury, Somerset. Hawkins paid for fossils exposed by erosion at Lyme Regis on the Dorset Coast, and quarrymen at inland quarries at Street and Edgarley in Somerset. He also collected geological specimens on the Isle of Wight.

His early collection was sold to the Natural History Museum for £3,000. Hawkins published a number of texts between the 1830s and 1850s. The two best known are Memoirs of Icthyosaurii and Plesiosaurii (1835) and The Book of the Great Sea Dragons – full title The book of the great sea-dragons, Ichthyosauri and Plesiosauri, [gedolim taninim] gedolim taninim, of Moses. Extinct monsters of the ancient earth. With thirty plates, copied from skeletons in the author's collection of fossil organic remains, (deposited in the British museum.) (London, W. Pickering, 1840). He is buried in Ventnor on the Isle of Wight. His grave can be seen at Ventnor Cemetery. Hawkins was a Fellow of the Geological Society of London.

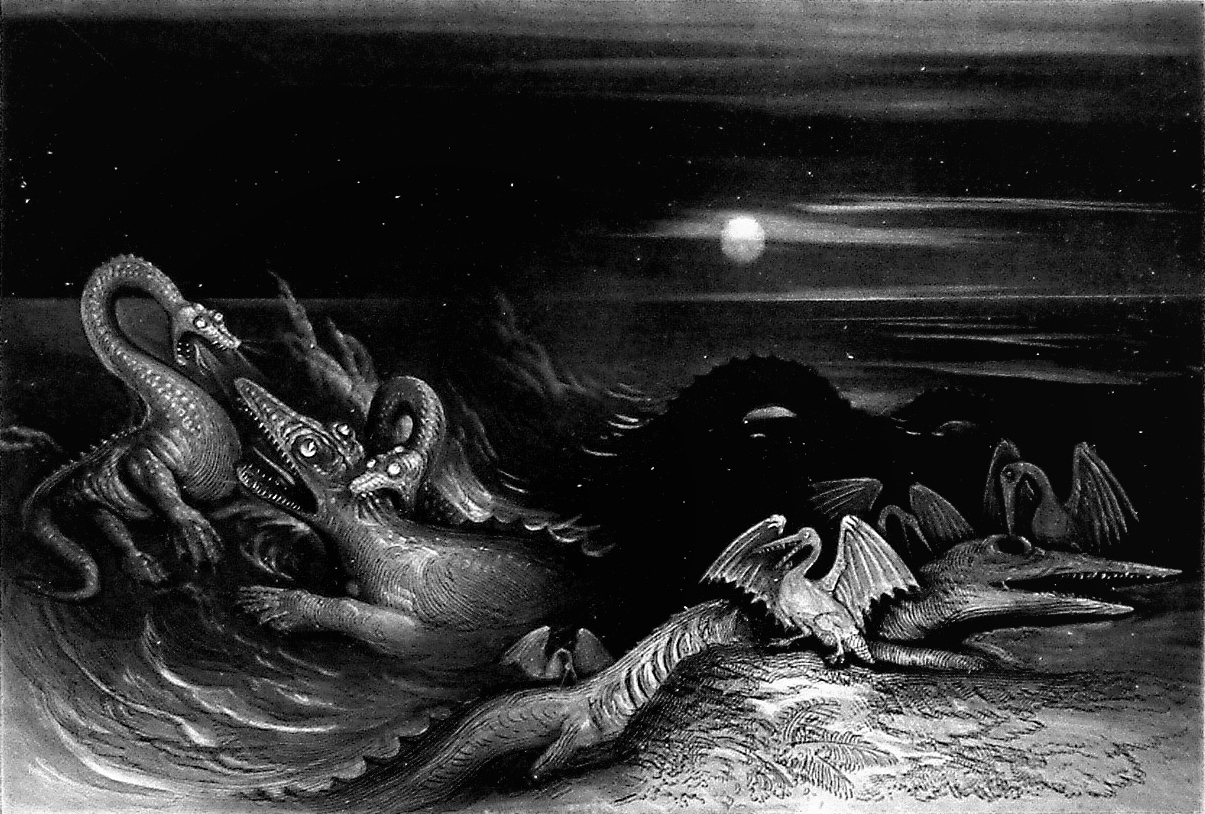
Front piece of The book of the Great Sea Dragons

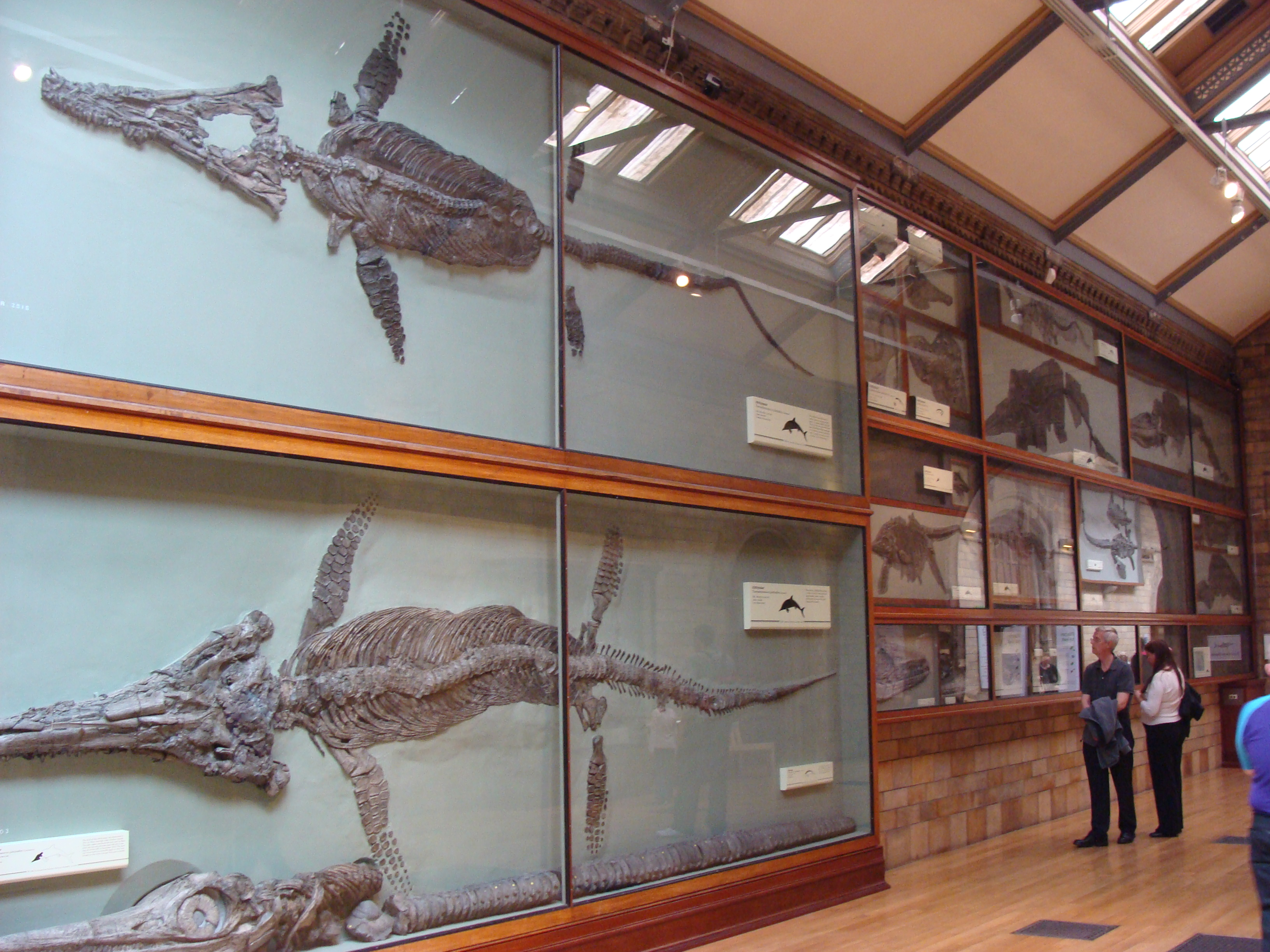
Hawkins's specimens are still on show at the Natural History Museum, London.
