= Gonioceras =

Gonioceras Temporal range: Middle Ordovician

Scientific classification
- Domain: Eukaryota
- Kingdom: Animalia
- Phylum: Mollusca
- Class: Cephalopoda
- Subclass: Nautiloidea
- Order: †Actinocerida
- Family: †Gonioceratidae
- Genus: †Gonioceras; Hall, 1847

Extinct genus of nautiloids

Gonioceras is an extinct genus of actinocerid nautiloidean cephalopods typified by a broad, low shell; flattened ventrally, convexly rounded dorsally; top and bottom meeting at an acute angle along the sides. In most the shell is rather thin, especially along the lateral portion. The aperture is contracted. Sutures from broad ventral and dorsal lobes, more narrowly rounded ventro-lateral and dorso-lateral saddles, and sharp pointed lateral lobes; more complex than in later Lambeoceras. The siphuncle is typically subcentral but may be closer to the venter; armenocerid in form with short segments and very short brims and containing a straight endosiphuncular canal system.

Gonioceras is derived from Armenoceras and is the type genus of Gonioceratidae. Fossils are found in marine strata of the Chazy and Blackriveran of the Middle Ordovician in the Champlain region of eastern North America and at the Paquette Rapids of the Ottawa River in Ontario. The type species, Gonioceras anceps was named by Hall in 1847.

The flattened shell suggests that the living animal was a benthic organism.
