= Adamsoceras =

Adamsoceras Temporal range: Ordovician

Scientific classification
- Kingdom: Animalia
- Phylum: Mollusca
- Class: Cephalopoda
- Subclass: Nautiloidea
- Order: †Actinocerida
- Family: †Wutinoceratidae
- Genus: †Adamsoceras; Flower, 1957

Species
- †Adamsoceras holmi Troedsson, 1926; †Adamsoceras isabelae Flower, 1957

Extinct genus of cephalopods

Adamsoceras is a genus of actinocerids of the family Wutinoceratidae, with spheroidal siphuncle segments like Ormoceras, but having a reticular canal system like Wutinoceras. Adamsoceras has a slender, gently expanding, orthoconic shell that is slightly broader than high, i.e. depressed, with close spaced septa that form ventral lobes and a siphuncle that is near the ventral margin.

Adamsoceras is known from rocks of Whiterockian age (early Middle Ordovician) in Nevada, the Baltic, Tasmania, and Manchuria. It may have been derived from Wutinoceras, or from a common ancestor, and gave rise to Ormoceras.

The genotype is Adamsoceras isabelae from the upper Pogonip Group in Ikes Canyon in the Toquima Range in Nevada.
