= Nybyoceras =

Nybyoceras Temporal range: M- U Ordovician

Scientific classification
- Kingdom: Animalia
- Phylum: Mollusca
- Class: Cephalopoda
- Subclass: Nautiloidea
- Order: †Actinocerida
- Family: †Armenoceratidae
- Genus: †Nybyoceras; Troedsson, 1926

Extinct genus of nautiloids

Nybyoceras is an actinocerid genus assigned to the Armenoceratidae and similar to Armenoceras except for having a siphuncle close to the ventral side of the shell.

== Morphology ==
As with Armenoceras, Nybyoceras has a medium to large, straight shell.(Teichert 1964) Its primary diagnostic feature is its ventral siphuncle which the septa across obliquely.(Flower 1957, Teichert 1964) Ventrally, the septal necks are short and free, or recumbent for a short distance. Dorsally the brims are definitely recumbent.(Flower 1957) The connecting rings are broadly adnate to the septa ventrally at the posterior ends of the segments and dorsally at the anterior (adoral) ends.(Teichert 1964) Flower (1957) described the canal system within the siphuncle as being primarily of the single arc type, like Armenoceras, and with interconnecting tubes. Teichert (1964) describes the canal system as being reticulate to curved and branching.

== Phylogengy and distribution ==
Nybyoceras is derived from Wutinoceras according to Flower (1976) although there is a possibility of its being derived from an early Armenoceras (Flower 1968).

Nybyoceras ranges from the Middle Ordovician (Chazyan equivalent) in northeast China to the early Upper Ordovician Cobourg-Eden-Red Stage tn North America, (Flower 1976) and according to Flower (1968, 1976) left no descendant genera. Teichert on the other hand, earlier (1964) indicated that Nybyoceras gave rise to the Ordovician Selkirkoceras and to the Silurian Megadisocosorus.
