= Horneridae =

Scientific classification
- Domain: Eukaryota
- Kingdom: Animalia
- Phylum: Bryozoa
- Class: Stenolaemata
- Order: Cyclostomatida
- Family: Horneridae

Family of bryozoans

Horneridae is a family of bryozoans belonging to the order Cyclostomatida.

Genera:

- Eohornera Brood, 1972
- Filicavea d'Orbigny, 1853
- Frontohornera Grischenko, Gordon & Melnik, 2018
- Hornera Lamouroux, 1821
- Siphodictyum Lonsdale, 1849
- Spinihornera Brood, 1979
