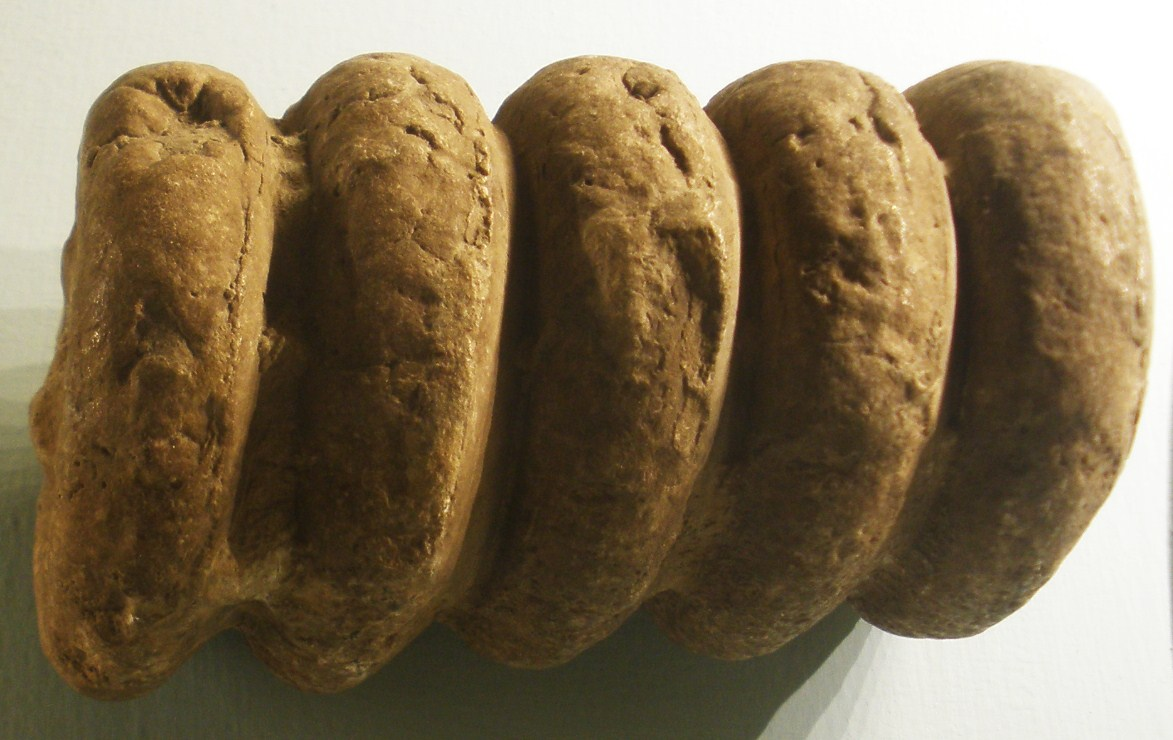
- Part of the isolated siphuncle of an armenoceratid nautiloid cephalopod

Scientific classification
- Domain: Eukaryota
- Kingdom: Animalia
- Phylum: Mollusca
- Class: Cephalopoda
- Subclass: Nautiloidea
- Order: †Actinocerida
- Family: †Armenoceratidae; Troedsson (1926)

Genera
- See text

= Armenoceratidae =

Armenoceratidae Temporal range: M Ordovician - Silurian

Extinct family of molluscs

The Armenoceratidae are a family of early Paleozoic nautiloid cephalopods belonging to the order Actinocerida.

The Armenoceratidae, established by Troedsson (1926) are characterized by large, straight, or slightly curved shells and large siphuncles with strongly expanded segments between the septa. Septal necks are short and abruptly recurved along brims. Radial canals in the endosiphuncular canal system are typically arched, curving forward and backward from near the septal foramina (openings) to connect with the parispatium on either side of the middle of each segments. The parispatium is the narrow opening between the inner side of the connecting rings in actinocerids and the internal siphuncular deposits that grow forward and back from the region of the septal openings.

The Armenoceratidae have their beginning in Armenoceras which first appeared near the beginning of the Chazyan, 2nd stage of the Middle Ordovician in older established chronologies, in northeastern China, Manchuria, derived from Wutinoceras. Additional genera include Nybyoceras and Selkirkoceras, respectively, from the upper Middle and Upper Ordovician, and Monocyrtoceras, Elrodoceras, and Megadiscoceras from the Silurian,

The Armenoceratidae, Armenoceras, Nybyoceras, and Selkirkoceras, first appear in North America in the diverse cephalopod Redriveran faunas of the early Upper Ordovician but are no longer found during that stage in Asia. Selkirkoceras is a large armenocerid from the Upper Ordovician with a blunt, flattened, somewhat breviconic shell.

Among the Silurian genera, Elrodoceras has a large shell with the apical part slightly curved, otherwise is straight, and a siphuncle that is narrower than in Armenoceras. Monocyrtoceras has a siphuncle like that of Elrodoceras, but the entire shell is gently and evenly curved. Megadiscosorus is similar to Armenoceras, but more breviconic and slightly exogastrically cyrtoconic and with the siphuncle in contact with the ventral wall.

The Armenoceratidae most likely gave rise through Armenoceras to Gonioceras in the Chazyan, and later in the Middle Ordovician, possibly through either an early Armenoceras or Nybyoceras to Actinoceras
