= Armenoceras =

Armenoceras Temporal range: M Ordovician - Silurian
- Fossil specimen, Shanghai Natural History Museum

Scientific classification
- Kingdom: Animalia
- Phylum: Mollusca
- Class: Cephalopoda
- Subclass: Nautiloidea
- Order: †Actinocerida
- Family: †Armenoceratidae
- Genus: †Armenoceras; Foeste, 1924

Extinct genus of molluscs

Armenoceras is a genus of actinocerid nautiloid cephalopods whose fossils ranged from the late Whiterockian Stage in the early Middle Ordovician, through the remainder of the period and on into the Upper Silurian. It is the type genus of the family Armenoceratidae.

The shells of Armenoceras are straight and medium to large in size with a circular to subcircular cross section. The siphuncle is large, located subcentrally to resting on the ventral margin. Segments are wider than long, broadly expanded into the camerae. Septal necks short with wide brings that may be in contact with posterior surface of septa. In most the canal system within the siphuncle in is of the double arc type. Cameral deposits are rare.

Armenoceras is derived from Wutinoceras through a thinning of the connecting rings and a simplification of the endosiphuncular canal system.

The earliest Armenoceras known comes from the lower Whiterock equivalent in northern China and Korea but is unknown in North America until the end of the Middle Ordovician when it appears in Red River faunas. Worldwide, in addition to east Asia and North America including Greenland, Armenoceras has been found in northern Europe, Russia, and Australia.

Armenoceras is thought to have given rise to Nybyoceras in the Chazyan (Flower 1968), although the reverse was earlier suggested in Teichert (1964), and to Selkirkoceras in the Eden-Red River Stage in the Upper Ordovician. Possible Silurian derivatives include Megadiscosorus, Monocyrtoceras, and Elrodoceras although some may turn our to have Nybyoceras as the progenitor.
