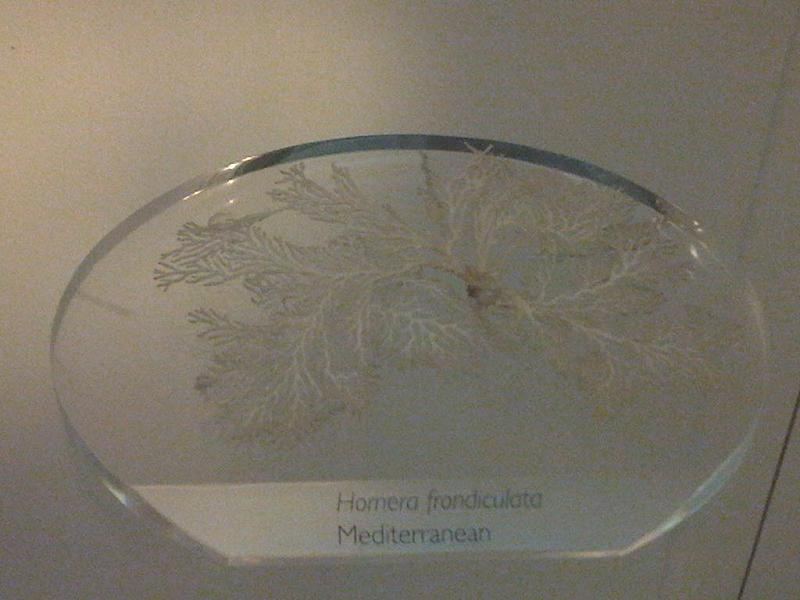
- Hornera frondiculata

Scientific classification
- Kingdom: Animalia
- Phylum: Bryozoa
- Class: Stenolaemata
- Order: Cyclostomatida
- Family: Horneridae
- Genus: Hornera; Lamouroux, 1821

Synonyms
- Crassohornera Waters, 1887; Monodesmopora Udin, 1964; Retihornera Kirchenpauer, 1869

= Hornera (bryozoan) =

Genus of bryozoans

Hornera is a genus of bryozoans belonging to the family Horneridae.

The genus has a cosmopolitan distribution.

== Species ==
The following species are recognised in the genus Hornera:

- †Hornera airensis Maplestone, 1903
- Hornera americana d'Orbigny, 1842
- †Hornera andegavensis Michelin, 1847
- †Hornera annulata El Hajjaji, 1992
- Hornera antarctica Waters, 1904
- †Hornera arbuscula (Reuss, 1848)
- †Hornera asperula Reuss, 1869
- Hornera australis Kirchenpauer, 1869
- †Hornera bipunctata Roemer, 1863
- Hornera brancoensis Calvet, 1907
- Hornera caespitosa Busk, 1875
- †Hornera canaliculata Busk, 1859
- †Hornera canui Calvet, 1911
- Hornera cerviformis Ortmann, 1890
- †Hornera circumporosa Beutler, 1908
- †Hornera circumsulcata Hejjas, 1894
- †Hornera claibornensis De Gregorio, 1890
- †Hornera clavata d'Orbigny, 1852
- †Hornera concatenata Reuss, 1869
- †Hornera crispa Defrance, 1821
- Hornera currieae Batson, Tamberg, Gordon, Negrini & Smith, 2021
- †Hornera curva MacGillivray, 1895
- †Hornera curvirostra Hejjas, 1894
- †Hornera darchiaci Reuss, 1869
- †Hornera densipunctata (Bobies, 1958)
- †Hornera diffusa MacGillivray, 1895
- †Hornera dorsocavata Bobies, 1958
- †Hornera edwardsii d'Archiac, 1847
- †Hornera elegans Defrance, 1821
- †Hornera elevata MacGillivray, 1895
- Hornera erugata Hayward & Cook, 1983
- Hornera falklandica Borg, 1944
- †Hornera farehamensis Gregory, 1893
- †Hornera fibrosa Reuss, 1865
- Hornera foliacea MacGillivray, 1869
- Hornera frondiculata (Lamarck, 1816)
- Hornera galeata Smitt, 1872
- †Hornera haueri d'Orbigny, 1853
- †Hornera hippolithus Defrance, 1821
- †Hornera humilis Busk, 1859
- †Hornera hybrida (d'Archiac, 1847)
- †Hornera infundibulata Busk, 1859
- †Hornera involuta MacGillivray, 1895
- †Hornera jacksonica Canu & Bassler, 1920
- Hornera jeongsangi Zágoršek, Chae, Min, Yang & Seo, 2017
- †Hornera lamellosa Roemer, 1863
- Hornera lasarevi Androsova, 1968
- †Hornera lataramae Canu & Bassler, 1929
- Hornera lichenoides (Linnaeus, 1758)
- †Hornera lunata Busk, 1859
- †Hornera lunularis Stoliczka, 1865
- Hornera mediterranea Harmelin, 2020
- †Hornera nitens Roemer, 1863
- †Hornera nummulitorum d'Orbigny, 1853
- †Hornera pacifica Stoliczka, 1865
- Hornera pectinata Busk, 1861
- †Hornera pertusa Busk, 1859
- †Hornera polyporoides Canu & Bassler, 1920
- †Hornera prominens MacGillivray, 1895
- Hornera pseudolichenoides Gontar, 1996
- †Hornera quadrata MacGillivray, 1895
- †Hornera radians Defrance, 1821
- Hornera ramosa MacGillivray, 1887
- †Hornera reteporacea Milne Edwards, 1838
- †Hornera reteramae Canu & Bassler, 1920
- †Hornera reticulata (Busk, 1859)
- †Hornera rhipis Busk, 1859
- †Hornera rhomboidalis Busk, 1859
- Hornera robusta MacGillivray, 1883
- †Hornera rubeschi Reuss, 1848
- Hornera rugulosa Jullien, 1882
- †Hornera seriatopora Reuss, 1848
- †Hornera serrata d'Orbigny, 1854
- †Hornera simplicissima Braga & Barbin, 1988
- Hornera smitti Borg, 1944
- †Hornera sparsipora Hennig, 1894
- †Hornera striata Milne Edwards, 1838
- †Hornera subannulata Philippi, 1844
- †Hornera sulcata MacGillivray, 1895
- †Hornera sulcosa Reuss, 1866
- †Hornera tenuirama Canu & Bassler, 1920
- †Hornera tenuis MacGillivray, 1895
- †Hornera tortuosa Roemer, 1863
- †Hornera trabecularis Reuss, 1869
- †Hornera truncatuloides Mokrinskij, 1916
- †Hornera tuberculata MacGillivray, 1895
- †Hornera tuberosa Canu & Bassler, 1920
- †Hornera verrucosa Reuss, 1851 non Reuss, 1848
- Hornera versipalma (Lamarck, 1816)
- †Hornera waipukurensis (Waters, 1887)
