= Wutinoceras =

Wutinoceras Temporal range: early Middle Ordovician (Whiterockian)

Scientific classification
- Kingdom: Animalia
- Phylum: Mollusca
- Class: Cephalopoda
- Subclass: Nautiloidea
- Order: †Actinocerida
- Family: †Wutinoceratidae
- Genus: †Wutinoceras; Flower (1957, emend.)

Genus of nautiloids

Wutinoceras is a genus of now extinct nautiloid cephalopods of the Wutinoceratidae family. It exhibits orthoconic actinocerids with ventral siphuncles composed of broadly expanded segments.

== Distinguishing characteristics ==
Wutinoceras, as with its family the Wutinoceratidae, has a reticulated canal system within the siphuncle, distinguishing it from later forms with arcuate canal systems. Septal necks, components of the siphuncle that project from the back side of the septa, are cyrtochoanitic (outwardly curved) and may be recumbent. Connecting rings are thick, reflective of the ancestral form.

== Varieties ==
The three varieties of Wutinoceras are based on the form of the siphuncle, and each contains a number of species. These have not been ascribed to subgenera. They include those with broad segments and strongly recumbent brims to the septal necks; those with large segments and rings free ventrally; and those with small segments in which the brims on the dorsal side are sometimes free. The genotype Wutinoceras foerste, which comes from northeast China (Manchuria), is of the second variety.

== Distribution ==
Wutinoceras species of the broad-segment variety are found in Newfoundland, Oklahoma, and Tasmania; those of the large-segment variety are found in Utah, Nevada, Newfoundland, and Manchuria. Those of the small-segment variety have only been found in Nevada. unless new species described from elsewhere can be included.

== Phylogeny ==
Wutinoceras may have its origin in the primitive actinocerid Georgina from the upper Lower Ordovician of Northern Australia and east Asia although its exact ancestor remains elusive. Wutinoceras was once thought to be derived from Polydesmia from northern China, which was later) found to come from beds that overlie those with Wutinoceras, thereby precluding the possibility.

Wutinoceras gave rise to Cyrtonybyoceras with the development of a curved, cyrtoconic shell and to Adamsoceras with the development of a more narrow siphuncle. Wutinoceras is also the ancestor of the Armenoceratidae which gave rise in the later Middle Ordovician to Actinoceras and Gonioceras.
