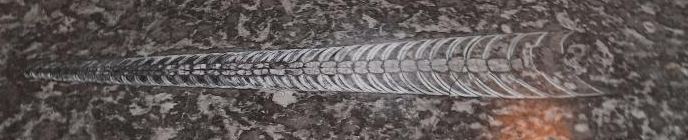
- Cast of a specimen discovered at the Newbury Marble Works, Derbyshire, England that is part of the OUMNH coll.

Scientific classification
- Kingdom: Animalia
- Phylum: Mollusca
- Class: Cephalopoda
- Subclass: Nautiloidea
- Order: †Actinocerida
- Family: †Actinoceratidae
- Genus: †Actinoceras; Bronn, 1835

Type species
- Actinoceras bigsbyi Bronn, 1835

Synonyms
- Actinoceratites Bronn, 1834 (nomen nudum); Conotubularia Troost, 1838 (nomen nudum); Arctinoceras de Castelnau, 1843 (nomen nudum); Metactinoceras Zhuravleva, 1857

= Actinoceras =

Actinoceras Temporal range: Middle Ordovician–Early Silurian

Extinct genus of molluscs

Actinoceras is a genus of extinct cephalopod that lived from the middle Ordovician to the Early Silurian. It is the type genus of the Actinoceratidae, a family of nautiloids that thrived in the waters of North America and Eurasia during the Paleozoic era. The first and type species, A. bigsbyi, was named in 1835 in honour of John Jeremaiah Bigsby, based on remains discovered in the limestones of Lake Huron. Since then, more than 45 species, divided into at least six species groups, have been described from North America, parts of Baltic Europe, and Siberia.

By actinoceratid standards, Actinoceras was quite large, with a shell length of up to 1 m (3.3 ft). The shape of its shell varied between species, though generally it was straight. In most species, it was fusiform (wide in the middle and tapered at both ends). In certain species, it tapered off and curved downward towards the tip. The chambers of Actinoceras' shell were fairly short, with closely spaced septa. The shell's exterior would have been smooth in life. Lifestyles varied between species, though all appear to have lived fairly low in the water column (in a benthic environment).

== History of study ==
The first specimens of Actinoceras were discovered in the limestones of Lake Huron, one of the Great Lakes of North America. German geologist and palaeontologist Heinrich Georg Bronn was the first to examine the remains and gave them the informal name Actinoceratites in 1834. As part of an 1835 work, Bronn properly described the specimens, giving them the genus name Actinoceras. The type species, A. bigsbyi, was named after John Jeremaiah Bigsby. Subsequently, multiple genera were named that were later synonymised with Actinoceras: Conotubularia, Arctinoceras, and Metactinoceras. The former two were nomina nuda, meaning that they were not published with an adequate scientific description.

The family Actinoceratidae was established by Louis Saemann in 1853, to include Actinoceras and closely related taxa which grew to have large shells with blunt apices, and large siphuncles with widely expanded segments and a generally arcuate endosiphucular canal system.

== Description ==
Actinoceras was a fairly large actinoceratid. It had a straight shell, typical of the family, which reached approximately 1 m (3.3 ft) in length. The shell had a blunt apex, and was usually circular to subcircular in cross-section, though this varied significantly between species.

=== Shell characteristics ===
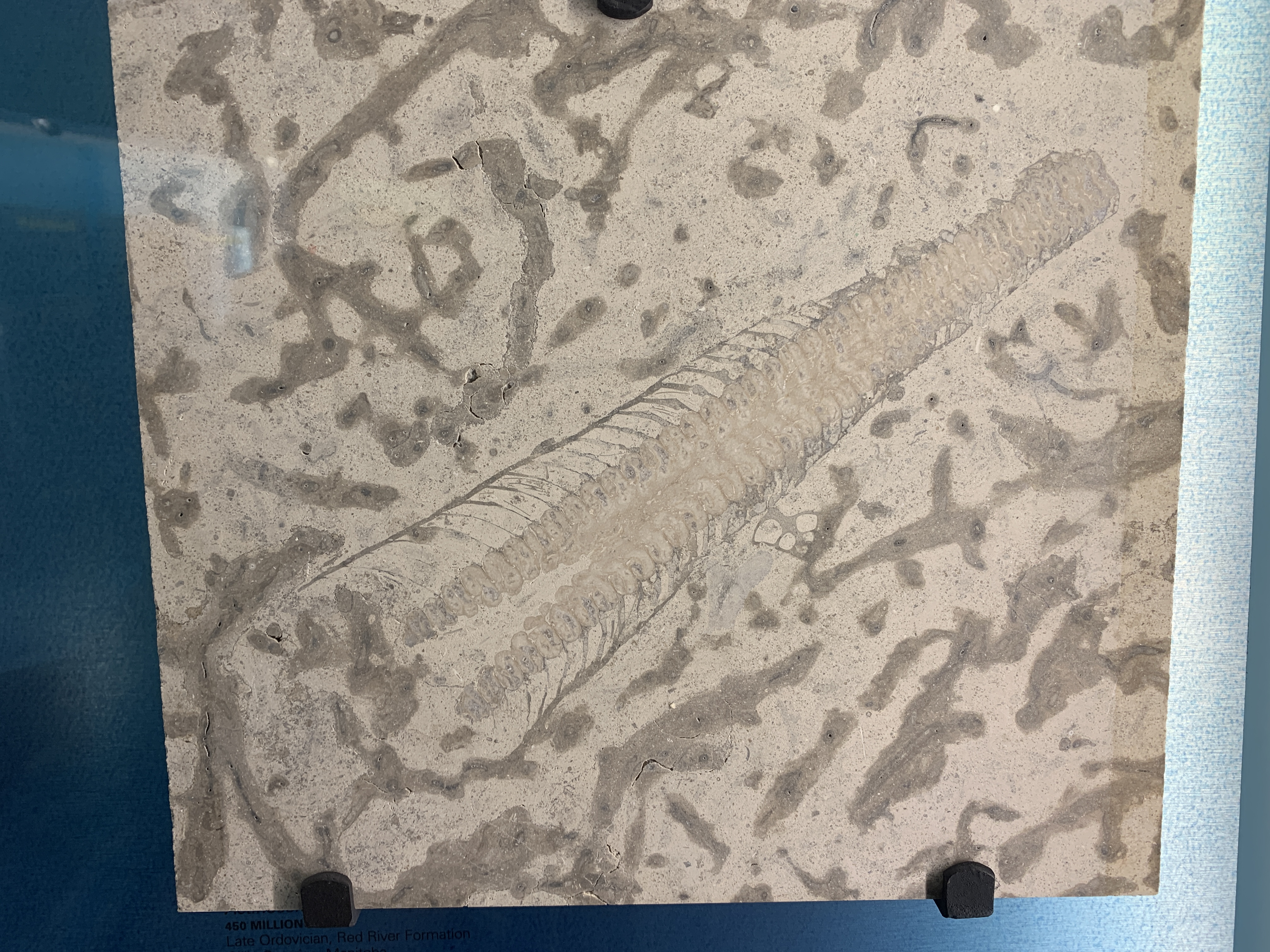
Actinoceras sp. at the Royal Tyrrell Museum

The shells of Actinoceras are generally straight and long, somewhat fusiform in shape, although some are breviconic. In some species the shell was curved endogastrically, meaning that it was curved ventrally towards the tip. Some are fusiform with the diameter decreasing from the anterior (front) end of the phragmocone toward the aperture. Chambers are short and contain cameral deposits which are more concentrated apically and ventrally. Septa are closely spaced, while sutures are mostly transverse. The exterior surface of the shell was smooth.

The siphuncle of Actinoceras was large and sat ventral to (below) the centre of the shell. It was relatively large, having maximum diameters between half and three-quarters the diameter of the shell depending on the species, and was composed (at least initially) of segments which expanded into each chamber to a greater extent than in Lambeoceras and Ormoceras but not as much as Armenoceras. Like many actinoceratids, Actinoceras' siphuncle started conventionally segmented but became "simplified" with age and growth. The diameter of the siphuncle typically becomes smaller with respect to that of the shell in the anterior part of the phragmocone. Septal necks are long with wide cyrtochoanitic to recumbent brims. Connecting rings are thin. Actinoceras, like many actinoceratids, had a siphuncle that started conventionally segmented but became "simplified" with age and growth.

The canal system within the siphuncle in Arctinoceras has a "single arc" morphology: near septal openings, the radial canals branch from the central canal, sweeping back and out and connecting to the parispatium (the parispatium is the narrow opening found in actinoceratids between the inner side of the connecting rings and the internal siphuncular deposits that grow forward and back from the region of the septal openings). This kind of morphology is also found in descendants of Actinoceras, such as in Lambeoceras, some Armenoceras, Nybyoceras, and in Gonioceras. The parispatium is a narrow opening or seam that forms between the inside of the connecting rings and the endosiphunclar deposits that grow forward and back from the region of the septal foramina.

== Taxonomy ==
=== Species ===
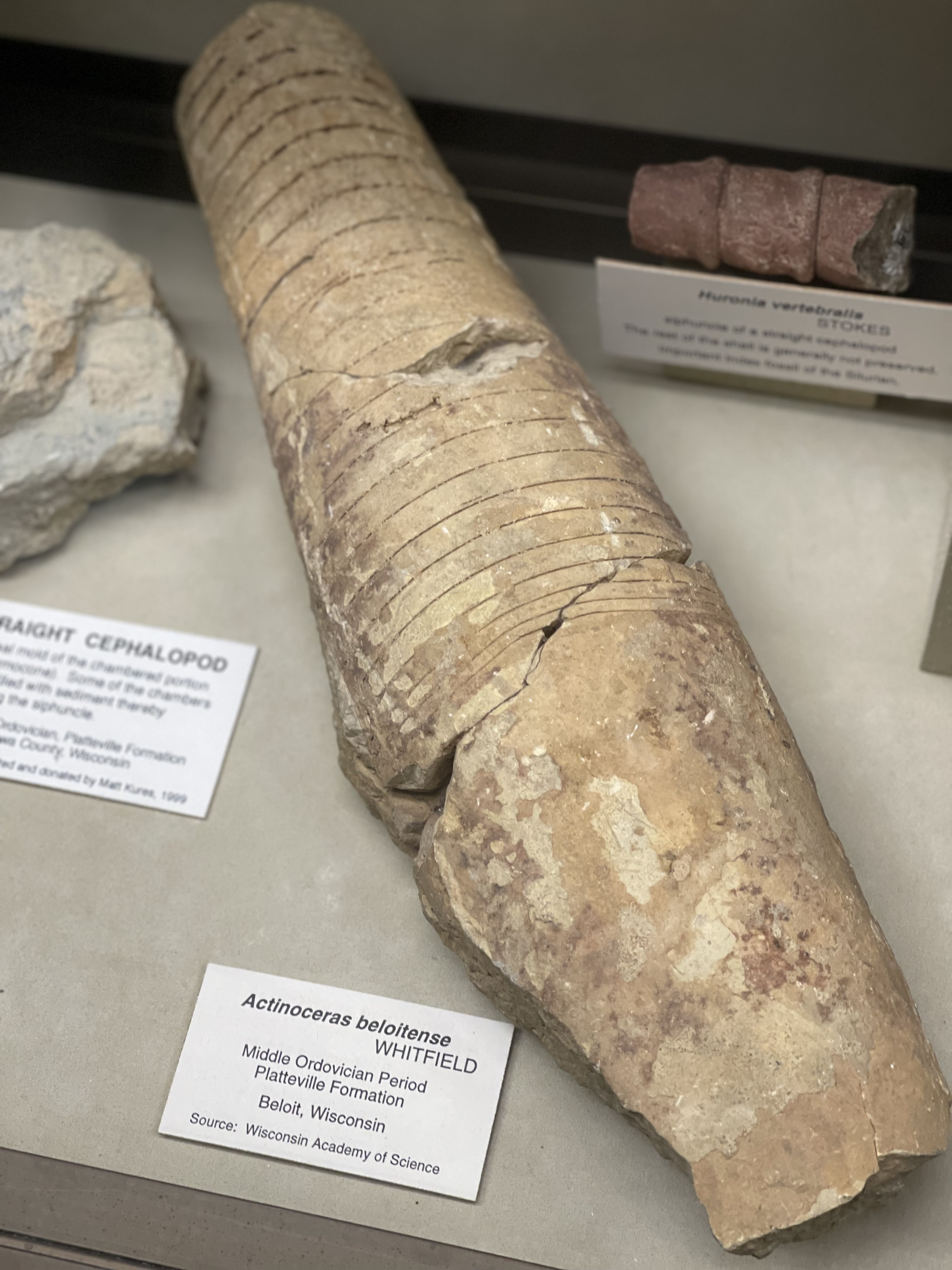
The holotype of Actinoceras beloitense

Actinoceras have been reported from various Middle Ordovician (Blackriveran) to Lower Silurian (Llandoverian) localities in North America, Baltic Europe, and Siberia. About 45 species have been described from North America, including Greenland and the Canadian Arctic, with Actinoceras margaretae, A. aequale, and A. gradatum the earliest known, coming from the lower Blackriveran Loweville Formation of Ottawa. Actinoceras concavum from the Ssuyan of southern Manchuria is most similar to Actinoceras centrale from the Chaumont of New York. Among the latest was the Silurian A. lesperancei from the earliest Silurian of Anticosti Island. Some species, such as A. subconicum and A. nummularium, have been reassigned to other genera, such as Armenoceras.

In 1957, Rosseau H. Flower divided Actinoceras into six species groups. In the Middle Ordovician, there was the Actinoceras ruedemanni Group, characterised by straight fusiform shells with flattened cross-sections and flat venters; the A. centrale Group, with closely spaced septa, broad siphuncles, and rounded segment outlines; and the A. paquettense Group, breviconic with fewer than twenty chambers (as opposed to the 30-40 chambers of members of the other species groups). Later in the Middle Ordovician, there was the A. winstoni Group, with slender shells that were curved apically and had circular cross-sections. In the Late Ordovician, there was the A. simplicem Group, with siphuncles that remained large and ventral with ontogeny; and the A. anticostiense Group, with tubular adoral regions.

=== Phylogeny ===
Actinoceras is one of seven known genera in the family Actinoceratidae. Actinoceras was suggested by Flower to have given rise to such genera as Kochoceras and Paractinoceras in the Actinoceratidae, and to Lambeoceras of the Lambeoceratidae. The ancestors of Actinoceras were suggested by Curt Teichert to be Armenoceras or perhaps Nybyoceras, also part of the Armenoceratidae.

In 2022, Alexander Pohle and colleagues used Bayesian phylogenetic inference to determine the interrelationships of straight-shelled nautiloids. The following cladogram is based on one of the topologies recovered by Pohle and colleagues:

- - - Multiceratoidea
    - Endoceratoidea
  - Orthoceratoidea
    - - - - - Pseudorthocerida
              - Centroonoceras
              - Isorthoceras
            - Orthocerida
              - Dawsonoceras
              - Orthoceras
          - Actinocerida
            - Actinoceras
            - Adamsoceras
        - Buttsoceras
      - - - Intejoceras
          - Protocycloceras
        - Lituitida
          - Lituites
          - Sinoceras
    - Riocerida
      - Bactroceras
      - Rioceras

In a more speciose topology, Pohle and colleagues recovered Polydesmia as the sister taxon of Actinoceras.

== Palaeoecology ==
It is difficult to determine how most actinoceroids lived, though certain inferences can be made. In 1935, American palaeontologist Curt Teichert attempted to identify the lifestyles of certain taxa based on the internal morphology of their shells and related structures. Actinoceras species were suggested by Teichert to have led two different lifestyles: species with heavy or wide siphuncles and well-developed deposits between their chambers were determined to have been benthic, living near the bottom of the water column; meanwhile, species without these traits were suggested to have been "capable of swimming, but perhaps mainly inclined to a benthonic life".
