= Chazy Formation =

Limestone deposit in North America

Stromatoporoid at Fisk Quarry, Isle La Motte, Vermont

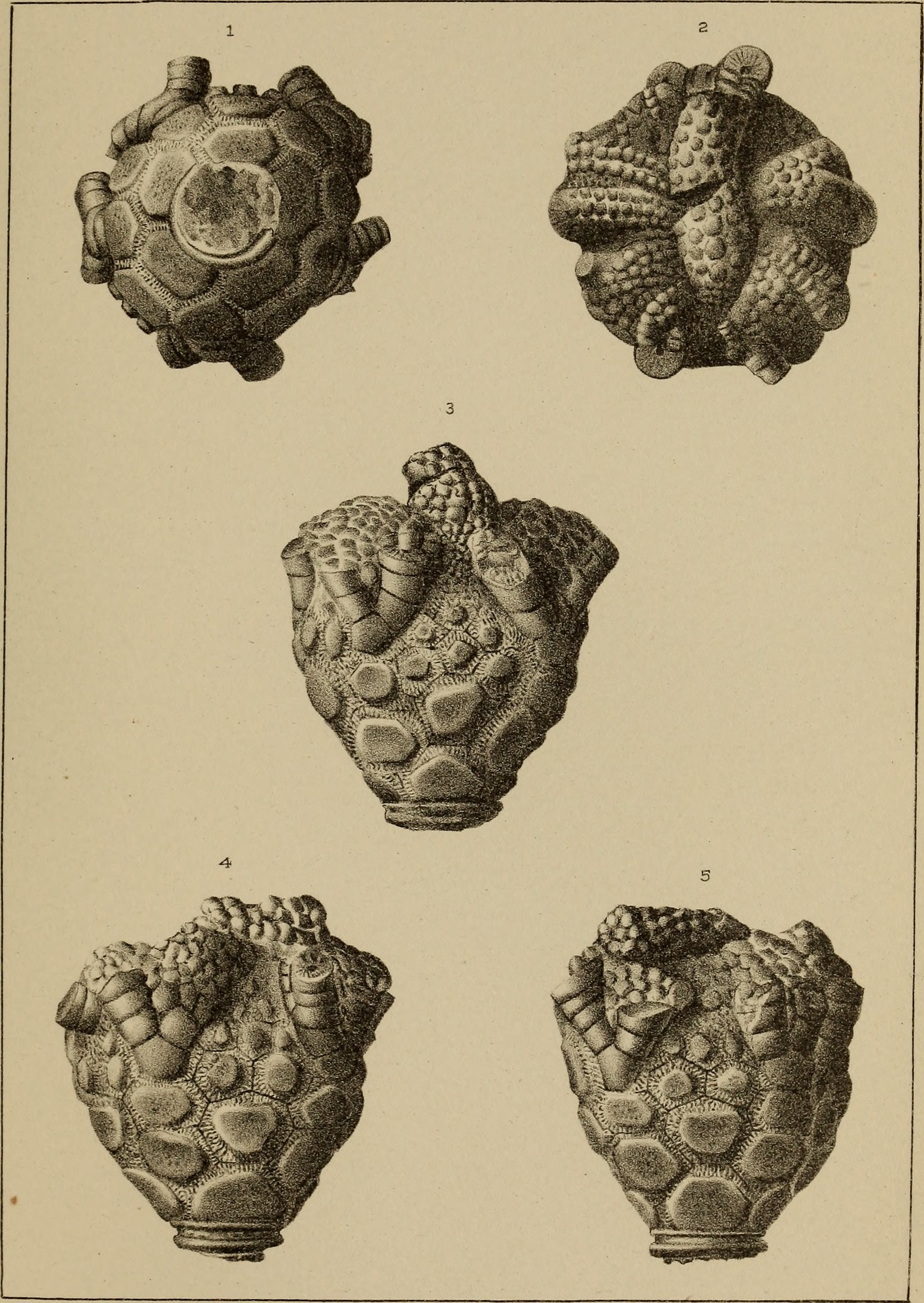
Chazy fossils (Rhaphanocrinus gemmeus), New York State Museum, 1902

The Chazy Reef Formation is a mid-Ordovician limestone deposit in northeastern North America.

It consists of some of the oldest reef systems built by a community of organisms rather than the deposit of a limited range of similar organisms, such as Stromatolite mounds deposited by ancient cyanobacteria. The reef structure was formed largely by cryptostome and trepostome bryozoa, some of the oldest known bryozoans, but corals made an early appearance, and stromatoporoids.

The formation is named for the small town of Chazy, New York, where the reef was noted by James Hall in Palaeontology of New York (vol. I, 1847) and the fossils first studied by the Canadian paleontologist Elkanah Billings (1858, 1859). The reef extends from Tennessee to Quebec and Newfoundland, but its most easily studied outcropping is at Goodsell Ridge, Isle La Motte, the northernmost island in Lake Champlain; there, gentle uplift has tilted the sediments: the bedding planes now dip slightly to the north, revealing sequences of horizons in exposed rock. The black limestone of Isle La Motte takes a polish, revealing the white "bird's-eye" markings of embedded fossil shells, notably the spirals formed by sliced gastropod shells. Rock of the Chazy Formation was quarried from the nineteenth century at the Fisk Quarry, Isle La Motte, the oldest quarry in Vermont. Portions of the exposed reef on several islands in Lake Champlain were dedicated as the Chazy Fossil Reef National Natural Landmark in 2009.

== Environment ==
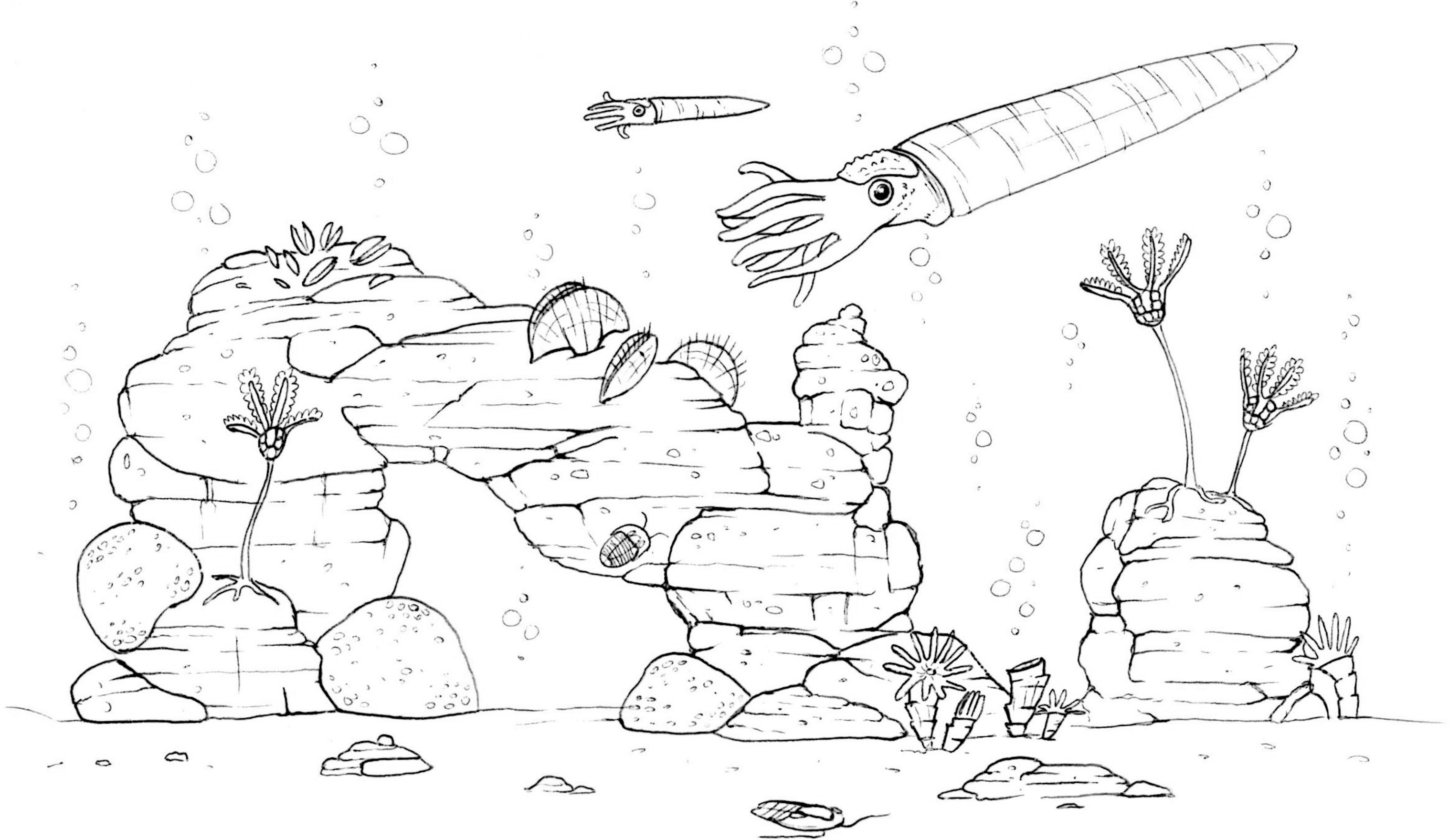
Life restoration of animals from the formation

The system formed in warm tropical waters of the Iapetus Ocean, in low latitudes of the Southern Hemisphere. The site was in shallow waters of a continental shelf: the continental craton of Laurentia lay to the west, beyond the lagoon system that formed behind the protective reef. The time was some 480-450 Ma (million years ago), at a period when global paleoclimate was so warm that the planet was all but ice-free. Atmospheric carbon dioxide was fourteen to sixteen times more plentiful than it is today.

The Chazy Reef Formation, which built up vertically from a muddy base catching fine dark silt as it grew, began as mounds deposited by bryozoans that stabilized a muddy bottom, then built up into the water column to such an extent that the connected mounds modified their surrounding environment (Mehrtens). As the reef aged, it began to offer an increasing variety of ecological niches, which fostered the first rich local biodiversity that has characterized all reef systems ever since. One dominant reef-building organism took the place of another, in a slowly evolving faunal succession.

The Chazy Reef Formation has given its name to the contemporaneous mid-Ordovician faunal stage, the Chazyan.
