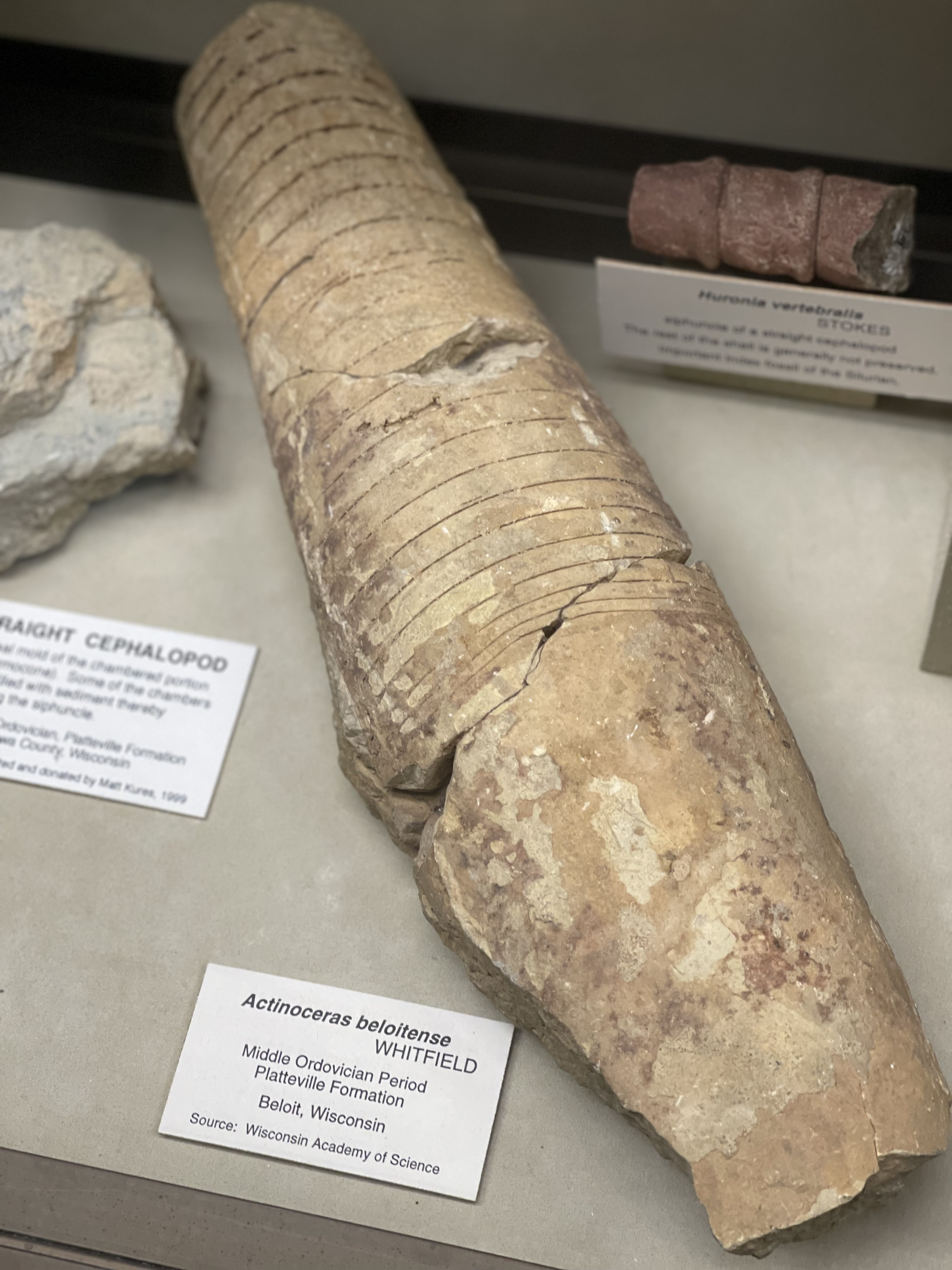
- The holotype specimen of Actinoceras beloitense in UW–Madison Geology Museum

Scientific classification
- Kingdom: Animalia
- Phylum: Mollusca
- Class: Cephalopoda
- Subclass: Nautiloidea
- Order: †Actinocerida; Teichert, 1933

= Actinocerida =

Actinocerida Temporal range: Lower Ordovician–Devonian
- General form of an Actinocerid

Extinct order of molluscs

The Actinocerida are an order of generally straight, medium to large cephalopods that lived during the early and middle Paleozoic, distinguished by a siphuncle composed of expanded segments that extend into the adjacent chambers, in which deposits formed within contain a system of radial canals and a narrow space along the inner side of the connecting ring known as a paraspatium. (Teichert 1964) Septal necks are generally short and cyrtochoanitic, some being recumbent, some hook shaped. Most grew to lengths of about 60 to 90 cm (2.0 to 3.0 ft) but some, like the Huroniidae of the Silurian grew significantly larger.

== Paleoecology ==
The Actinocerida inhabited shallow to quite deep waters, where they alternated between swimming and lying on the bottom. They were predatory, and able to control their buoyancy to a greater degree than their contemporaries.

== Derivation ==
The derivation of the Actinocerida remains enigmatic. They first appear late in the Early Ordovician (Cassinian Stage, late Floian) with the Georginidae but don't become well established until the beginning of the early Whiterockian Stage (Dapingian) of the Middle Ordovician (Flower 1868,1976) The Georginidae, introduced and described by Mary Wade in 1977 (Wade 1988), based on the genus Georgina, are known from the upper Canadian Coolibah Formation of the Georgina Basin in Northern Australia. How the Georginidae relate to older stocks is unclear. The Upper Cambrian Protactinocerida have been suggested as being ancestral but none are known to have gone beyond the near end of the Cambrian extinction, which makes any connection hypothetical.

Polydesmia was once thought to be the ancestral form of the actinocerids, and was derived from the ellesmeroceriid Bathmoceras. However, it turned out based on a reassessment of Lower Ordovician and Whiterockian formations in northeastern China that Polydesmia is antedated by Wutinoceras, its assumed primitive nature rather a derived condition.

== Evolution and diversification ==
Actinocerids first appeared early in the Middle Ordovician, with the exception of the Georginidae, which are known from the Cassinian in Northern Australia. They reached their greatest diversity in the Middle Ordovician with more than 20 genera, then declined somewhat in the Late Ordovician and more so in the Early Silurian; made a slight come back in the Middle Silurian but not to Late Ordovician numbers; and declined more or less steadily from the Late Silurian into the Devonian.

Three major lineages began the Middle Ordovician, the Actinoceratidae, Armenoceratidae, and Ormoceratidae. The Actinoceratidae and Armenoceratidae are most likely derived from Wutinoceras and the Ormoceratidae from a second wutinocerid genus, Adamsoceras. Gonioceras is an offshoot of an early Armenoceras; Lambeoceras and Huronia are offshoots of a later Actinoceras.

The Actinoceratidae extend into the Lower Silurian with Actinoceras; the Armenoceratidae and Huroniidae extend into the Upper Silurian. The Ormoceratidae are possibly the most recent, extending into the Lower Devonian Gonioceras (Gonioceratidae) is limited to the Middle Ordovician, its quasi-lookalike Lambeoceras (Lamberoceratidae) to the uppermost Middle and Upper Ordovician. The wutinocerids are known only from the early Middle Ordovician (Whiterockian) and the polydesmiadids are restricted to about that time.

Originating in the Ordovician, by the Devonian period actinocerids became rare; they may have been unable to compete with the more compact and maneuverable coiled nautiloids and ammonoids or cope with the arrival of jawed fish.

== Classification and taxonomy ==
The Actinocerida contain nine families; the Georginidae, Wutinoceratidae, Polydesmiidae, Armenoceratidae, Ormoceratidae, Actinoceratidae, Gonioceratidae, Lambeoceratide, and Huroniidae. The Carbactinoceratidae, included in the taxonomy in the Treatise, (Vol K) have been removed to the Pseudorthocerida.

Georginidae, Wade 1977; late E- early M Ord., Aust, Asia; Georgina, Mesaktoceras
Wutinoceratidae, Shimazu and Obata, 1938, ?late E - early M Ord (Whiterock); Asia, Aunt N Am. N Eur. Wutinoceras, Cyrtonybyoceras, Adamsoceras, ........
Polydesmiidae, Kobayashi 1940; ?late E- M Ord, C and E Asia; Polydesmia, Ordoceras
Actinoceratidae, Seamann 1853, ?late E, M Ord - E Sil. Actinoceras, Kochoceras, Paractinoceras, Saffordoceras, Troostoceras
Lambeoceratidae; Lambeoceras,
Huroniidae, Huronia, Huroniella, ? Discoactinoceras.
Armenoceratidae, Troedsson 1926; early M Ord - Sil. Armenoceras, Nybyoceras, Selkirkoceras, Elrodoceras
Gonioceratidae, late Mid Ord, N Am. Gonioceras (from early Armenoceratid)
Ormoceratidae, Seamann 1853, Ormoceras, Metarmenoceras, Parormoceras, Troedssonoceras........
