= Arenig =

Time interval during the Ordovician period

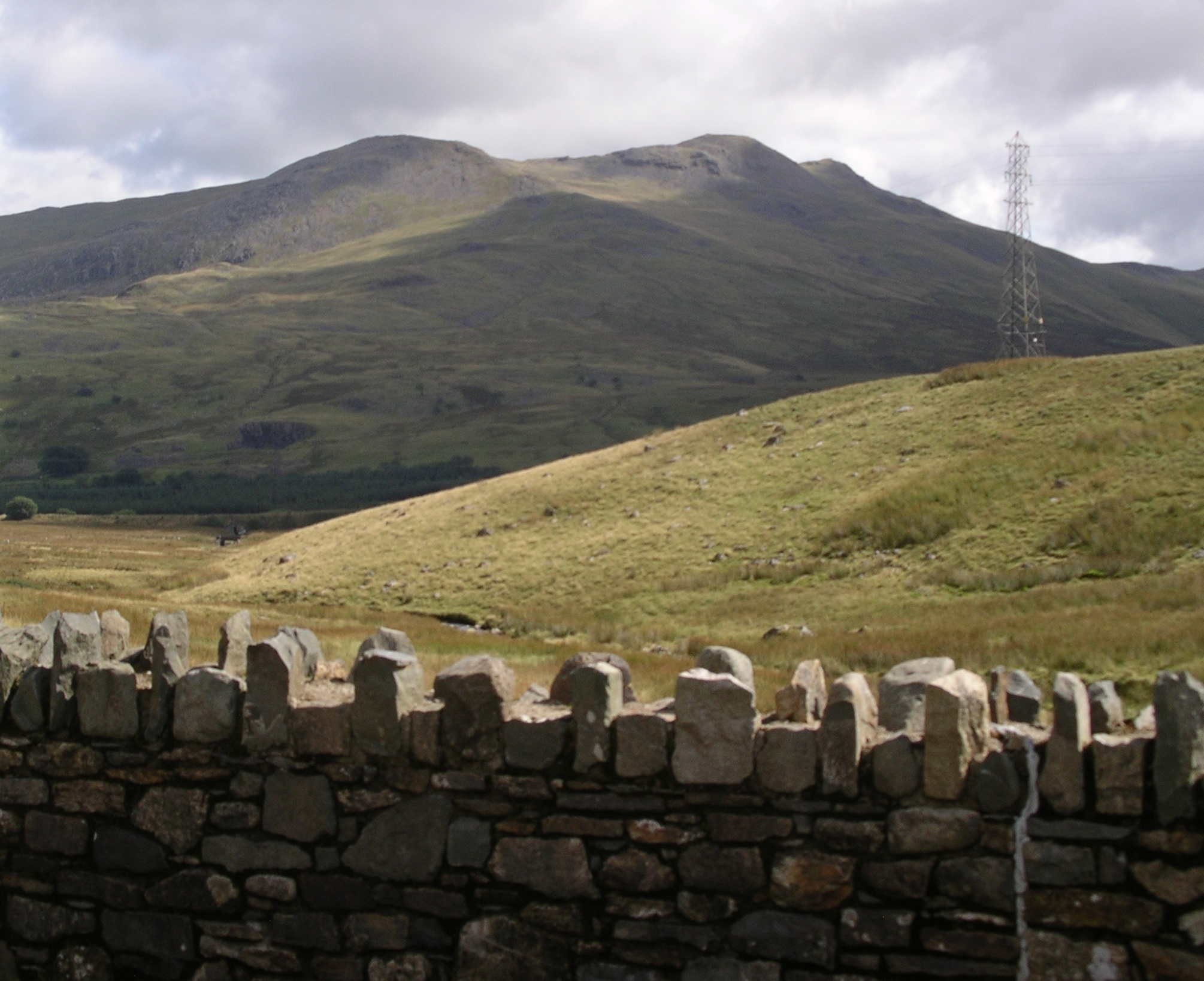
Arenig Fawr, the mountain which lends its name to the geological series

In geology, the Arenig (or Arenigian) is a time interval during the Ordovician period and also the suite of rocks which were deposited during this interval.

== History ==
The term was first used by Adam Sedgwick in 1847 with reference to the "Arenig Ashes and Porphyries" in the neighbourhood of Arenig Fawr, in Merioneth, North Wales. The rock-succession in the Arenig district has been recognized by W. G. Fearnsides (“On the Geology of Arenig Fawr and Moel Llanfnant", Q.J.G.S. vol. lxi., 1905, pp. 608–640, with maps). The above succession is divisible into:

1. A lower series of gritty and calcareous sediments, the "Arenig Series" as it is now understood;
2. A middle series, mainly volcanic, with shale, the "Llandeilo Series"; and
3. The shale and limestones of the Bala or Caradoc Stage.

It was to the middle series (2) that Sedgwick first applied the term "Arenig". In the typical region and in North Wales generally the Arenig series appears to be unconformable upon the Cambrian rocks; this is not the case in South Wales.

The Arenig series is represented in North Wales by the Garth Grit and Ty Obry beds, by the Shelve series of the Corndon district, the Skiddaw Slates of the Lake District, the Ballantrae Group of Ayrshire, and by the Ribband Series of slates and shale in Wicklow and Wexford. It may be mentioned here that the "Llanvirn" Series of H. Hicks was equivalent to the bifidus shale and the Lower Llandeilo Series.

== Geochronology ==
In the geologic timescale, the Arenig or Arenigian refers to an age of the Early Ordovician epoch, between 477.7 and 470 million years ago, contemporary with the Floian of the ICS, based on a section in Sweden (Diabasbrottet quarry) and with the same boundaries. The Arenig and Floian rocks are the upper part of the Lower Ordovician and follow the Tremadocian (Gasconadian in North America) which is the lower part. Either is followed by the Middle Ordovician ICS Dapingian or by the Llanvirnian of older chronologies. The Arenig and equivalent Floian are represented in North America by the upper three stages of the Canadian which is followed by the Middle Ordovician Whiterockian which is the lower part of the now shortened Chazyan.

== Events ==
The Arenig rocks were deposited during a sudden worldwide rise in sea level resulting in widespread marine transgression. The early Ordovician surge in marine diversity also began around this time.

== Brachiopod fauna ==
Incertae sedis brachiopods of the Floian

- Eurorthisina
- Tegulella

Acrotretida of the Floian

- Acanthambonia
- Cyrbasiotreta
- Eoconulus
- Issedonia
- Karnotreta
- Lurgiticoma
- Multispinula
- Mylloconotreta
- Numericoma
- Orthisocrania
- Polylasma
- Pomeraniotreta
- Pseudocrania
- Scaphelasma
- Schizotreta
- Torynelasma

Lingulida of the Floian

- Acanthorthis
- Aulonotreta
- Dictyobolus
- Ectenoglossa
- Elliptoglossa
- Monobolina
- Paldiskites
- Paterula
- Pseudolingula
- Quasithambonia
- Rafanoglossa
- Volborthia

Orthida of the Floian

- Acanthorthis
- Acanthotoechia
- Anchigonites
- Angusticardinia
- Anomalorthis
- Antigonambonites
- Apomatella
- Astraborthis
- Crossiskenidium
- Dalmanella
- Desmorthis
- Diparelasma
- Eodiorthelasma
- Eosotrematorthis
- Estlandia
- Euorthisina
- Famatinorthis
- Fasciculina
- Ferrax
- Ffynnonia
- Fistulogonites
- Glossorthis
- Glypterina
- Hesperonomiella
- Incorthis
- Jaanussonites
- Ladogiella
- Lomatorthis
- Monorthis
- Munhella
- Nereidella
- Neumania
- Nocturneilla
- Notoscaphidia
- Oligorthis
- Orthambonites
- Orthidiella
- Orthidium
- Orthis
- Oslogonites
- Panderina
- Paralenorthis
- Paurorthina
- Paurorthis
- Phragmorthis
- Platystrophia
- Platytoechia
- Polytoechia
- Pomatotrema
- Prantlina
- Productorthis
- Progonambonites
- Protohesperonomia
- Protoskenidiodes
- Pseudomimella
- Raunites
- Rhynchorthis
- Shoshonorthis
- Sinorthis
- Taphrorthis
- Tarfaya
- Treioria
- Trematorthis
- Valcourea
- Virgoria

Paternida of the Floian

- Dictyonites

Pentamerida of the Floian

- Acanthorthis
- Acanthoglypha
- Boreadocamara
- Camerella
- Doloresella
- Hesperotrophia
- Idiostrophia
- Imbricatia
- Karakulina
- Liricamera
- Lycophoria
- Porambonites
- Rectotrophia
- Rosella
- Rugostrophia
- Stenocamara
- Syntrophia
- Syntrophinella
- Xenelasma

=== Strophomenida ===
Strophomenida of the Floian

- Acanthorthis
- Ahtiella
- Aporthophyla
- Borua
- Calyptolepta
- Christiania
- Ingria
- Leptestia
- Petroria
- Plectambonites
- Reinversella
- Schedophyla
- Taffia
- Tourmakeadia

Trimerellida of the Floian

- Dinobolus

== Cephalopoda ==
Actinocerida

- Metactinoceras
- Ordosoceras
- Polydesmia

=== Upper ===
The following is a list of Actinocerid genera whose fossils are geochronologically found first in upper Arenig strata. These genera may survive into later portions of the Arenig stage, or even into later geological stages. This list should not be thought of in terms of the lifespan of the genera included.

- Leurorthoceras
- Nybyoceras
- Actinoceras
- Wutinoceras
- Ormoceras
- Adamsoceras
- Georgina

=== Orthocerida ===
Orthocerids of the Floian

- Eobactrites

Barrandeocerida of the Floian

- Plectoceras

Ellesmerocerida of the Floian

- Amsleroceras
- Apocrinoceras
- Avoceras
- Bakeroceras
- Baltoceras
- Catoraphinoceras
- Cochlioceras
- Copiceras
- Clelandoceras
- Cumberloceras
- Cyclostomiceras
- Cyrtobaltoceras
- Desioceras
- Diaphoroceras
- Diastoloceras
- Dwightoceras
- Dyscritoceras
- Ectocycloceras
- Endorioceras
- Eocyckistomiceras
- Eothinoceras
- Hemichoanella
- Irianoceras
- Kyminoceras
- Lawrenceoceras
- Meikeloceras
- Microbaltoceras
- Monogonoceras
- Ogygoceras
- Pictetoceras
- Protocycloceras
- Quebecoceras
- Rangeroceras
- Rhabdiferous
- Rioceras
- Rudolfoceras
- Smithvilloceras
- Somalinautilus
- Somalinautilus
- Somalinautilus
- Vassaroceras
- Veneficoceras
- Ventroloboceras

Endocerida

- Campendoceras
- Dartonoceras
- Kaipingoceras
- Kugeloceras
- Lobosiphon
- Manitouoceras
- Mcqueenoceras
- Mysticoceras
- Notocycloceras
- Oderoceras
- Parapiloceras
- Phragmosiphon
- Platysiphon
- Pliendoceras
- Retroclitendoceras
- Stenosiphon
- Subpenhsioceras
- Utoceras
- Yorkoceras
- Vaginoceras
- Chisiloceras
- Cyrtovaginoceras
- Tallinnoceras
- Juaboceras
- Penhsioceras
- Ventrolobendoceras

Lower

The following is a list of Endocerid genera whose fossils are geochronologically found first in lower Arenig strata. These genera may survive into later portions of the Arenig stage, or even into later geological stages. This list should not be thought of in terms of the lifespan of the genera included.

- Allopiloceras
- Choreanoceroides
- Escharendoceras
- Lebetoceras
- Loxochoanella
- Sewardoceras
- Telleroceras
- Clitendoceras
- Coreanoceras
- Cotteroceras
- Piloceras
- Endoceras
- Proterovaginoceras
- Cyrtendoceras
- Anthoceras
- Chaohuceras
- Proterocameroceras
- Thylacoceras

Upper

The following is a list of Endocerid genera whose fossils are geochronologically found first in upper Arenig strata. These genera may survive into later portions of the Arenig stage, or even into later geological stages. This list should not be thought of in terms of the lifespan of the genera included.

- Allocotoceras
- Cassinoceras
- Chihlioceras
- Cyclocyrtendoceras
- Cyptendoceras
- Kirkoceras
- Lobendoceras
- Najaceras
- Protocyclendoceras
- Yehlioceras
- Nanno
- Dideroceras
- Lobocyclendoceras
- Meniscoceras
- Paracyclendoceras
- Cacheoceras
- Perkinsoceras
- Williamsoceras
- Manchuroceras
- Schmidtoceras

Intejocerida of the Floian

- Bajkaloceras
- Evencoceras
- Intejoceras
- Rossoceras

Oncocerids of the Floian

- Phthanoncoceras
- Valhalloceras

Nautiloids of the Floian

- Buttsoceras
- Centroonoceras
- Gangshanoceras
- Geisonoceras
- Glenisteroceras
- Michelinoceras
- Orthoceras
- Oxfordoceras
- Rhynchorthoceras
- Stereoplasmoceras
- Tajaroceras
- Wardoceras

Tarphycerida

- Deltoceras
- Pseudancistroceras
- Seelyoceras

Lower

- Alaskoceras
- Moreauoceras
- Pilotoceras
- Shumardoceras
- Pycnoceras
- Campbelloceras
- Aphetoceras

Upper

- Aethoceras
- Bentoceras
- Centrotarphyceras
- Clytoceras
- Cycloplectoceras
- Eichwaldoceras
- Eurystomites
- Hardmanoceras
- Holmiceras
- Pionoceras
- Trocholitoceras
- Wichitoceras
- Tarphyceras
- Litoceras
- Curtoceras
- Arkoceras
- Estonioceras
- Tragoceras

== Trilobite fauna ==
Trilobites of the Floian

- Canningella
- Gogoella
- Macrogrammus
- Priceaspis
- Thymurus

Agnostida of the Floian'

- Galbagnostus
- Geragnostella

Asaphida of the Floian

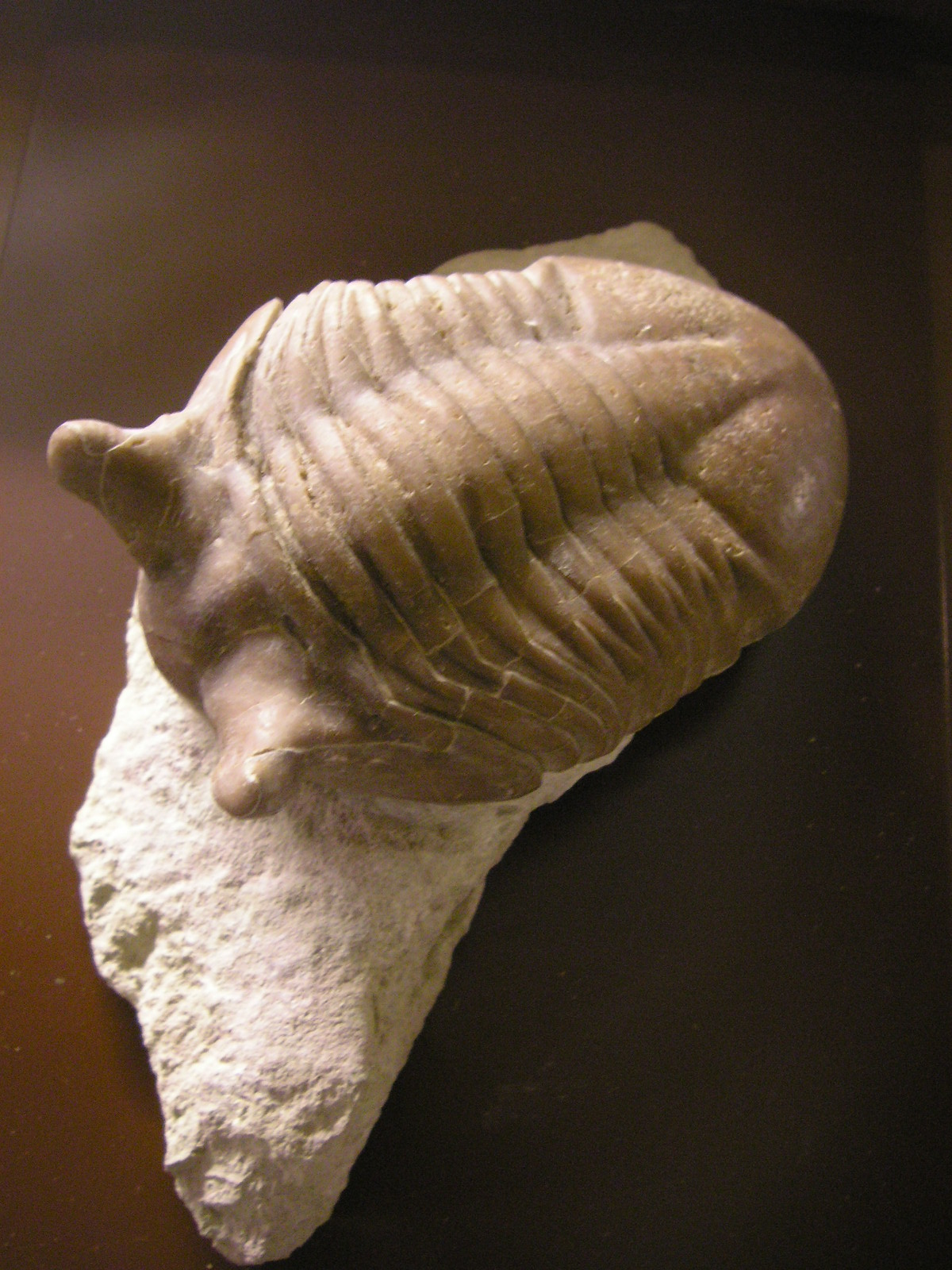
Asaphus

- Phthanoncoceras
- Ampyx
- Ampyxoides
- Anebolithus
- Asaphus
- Aspidaeglina
- Australopyge
- Bergamia
- Bohemopyge
- Borogothus
- Bumastides
- Ceratolithus
- Cloacaspis
- Cnemidopyge
- Degamella
- Dionide
- Dionidella
- Ellipsotaphrus
- Falanaspis
- Famatinolithus
- Globampyx
- Gog
- Hanchungolithus
- Hoekaspis
- Hungioides
- Hunnebergia
- Isocolus
- Isoteloides
- Lachnostoma
- Lannacus
- Lapidaria
- Liomegalaspides
- Megalaspidella
- Megalaspides
- Mendolaspis
- Merlinia
- Microparia
- Mioptychopyge
- Myttonia
- Ningkianolithus
- Niobides
- Ogmasaphus
- Ogyginus
- Ogygiocaris
- Opipeuter
- Parabasilicus
- Paraptychopyge
- Plesiomegalaspis
- Presbynileus
- Pricyclopyge
- Psilacella
- Psilocara
- Ptychopyge
- Rhombampyx
- Robergiella
- Seleneceme
- Stapeleyella
- Taihungshania
- Thysanopyge
- Trigonocercella
- Tungtzuella
- Zhenganites
- Zuninaspis

Corynexichida of the Floian

- Bumastus
- Dysplanus
- Ectillaenus
- Panderia
- Phillipsinella
- Pseudocalymene
- Theamataspis

Lichida of the Floian

- Apatolichas
- Autoloxolichas
- Lichakephalina
- Metopolichas

Odontopleurida of the Floian

- Phthanoncoceras
- Ceratocephala
- Diacanthaspis
- Selenopeltis

Phacopida of the Floian

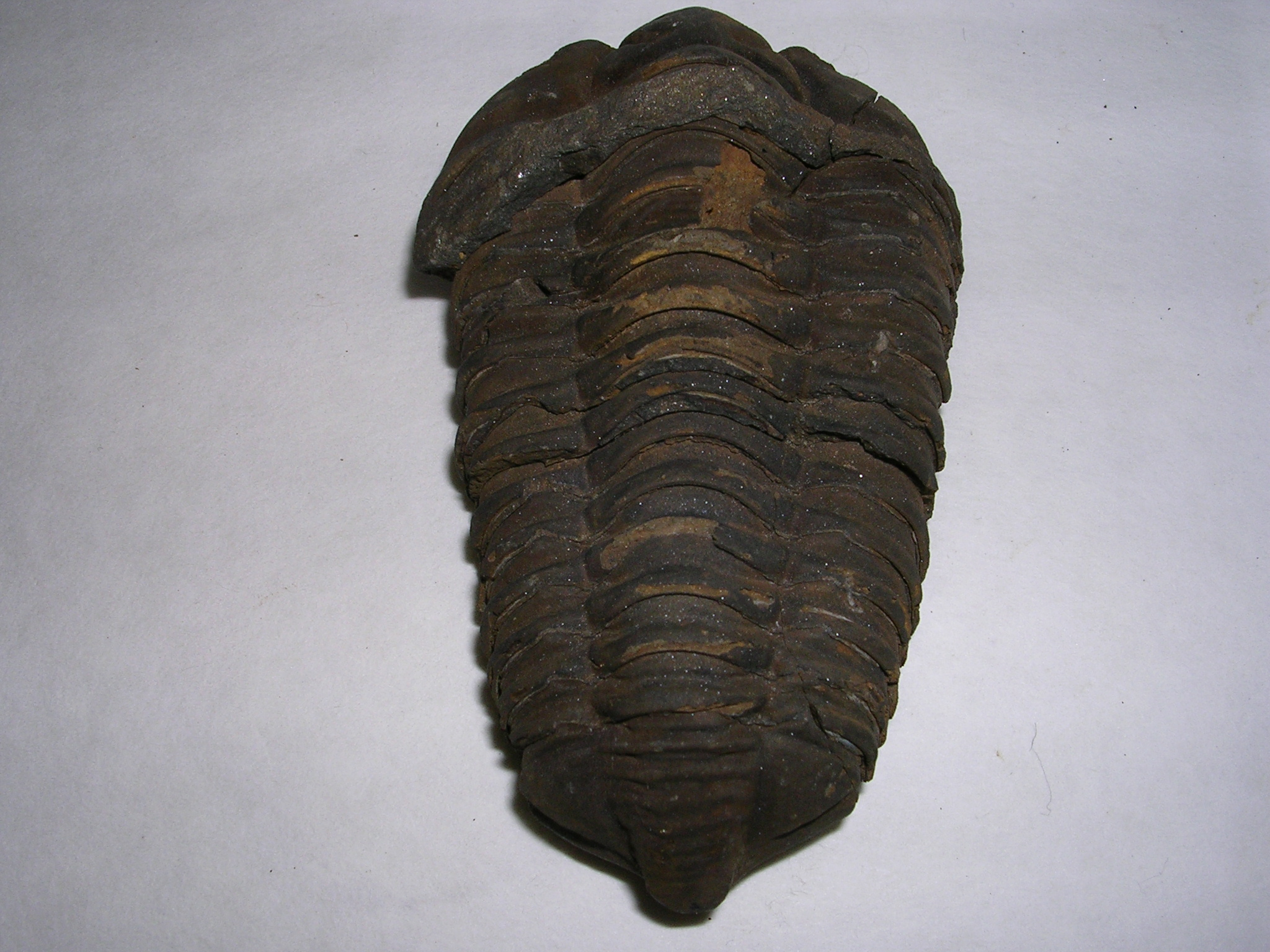
Colpocoryphe grandis

- Bathycheilus
- Calymenella
- Ceraurinella
- Colobinion
- Colpocoryphe
- Cybelopsis
- Cybelurus
- Diaphanometopus
- Dindymene
- Eccoptochile
- Ectenonotus
- Encrinurella
- Encrinuroides
- Evropeites
- Gyrometopus
- Heliomeroides
- Kanoshia
- Kawina
- Kolymella
- Lehua
- Lyrapyge
- Neseuretus
- Nieszkowskia
- Ormathops
- Ovalocephalus
- Placoparia
- Platycoryphe
- Pliomeridius
- Pliomerops
- Protoencrinurella
- Protopliomerella
- Pseudocybele
- Pterygometopus
- Strotactinus
- Sycophantia
- Synhomalonotus
- Toletanaspis
- Xystocrania

Proetida of the Floian

- Acidiphorus
- Bathyuriscops
- Benthamaspis
- Biolgina
- Bolbocephalus
- Carolinites
- Celmus
- Ceratopeltis
- Decoroproetus
- Dimeropygiella
- Eleutherocentrus
- Goniophrys
- Goniotelina
- Grinnellaspis
- Ischyrophyma
- Ischyrotoma
- Lutesvillia
- Oenonella
- Petigurus
- Rananasus
- Raymondaspis
- Telephina

Ptychopariida of the Floian

- Anaximander
- Annamitella
- Balnibarbi
- Bulnibarbi
- Bvalbardites
- Circulocrania
- Endymionia
- Etheridgaspis
- Furcalithus
- Gymnostomix
- Lacorsalina
- Leioshumardia
- Lordshillia
- Nambeetella
- Novakella
- Oopsites
- Peraspis
- Phorocephala
- Porterfieldia
- Prosopiscus
- Pytine
- Sagavia
- Selenoharpes
- Stegnopsis
- Stenorhachis
- Svalbardites
- Tasmanocephalus
- Turgicephalus
- Yinpanolithus
