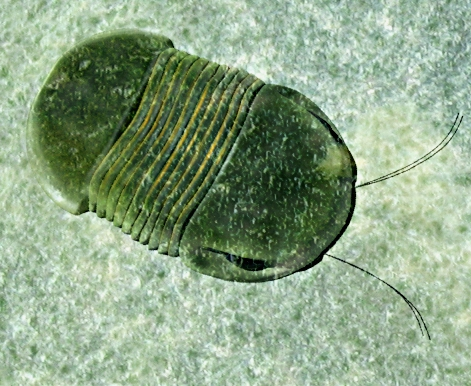
- An artist's reconstruction of Bumastus

Scientific classification
- Kingdom: Animalia
- Phylum: Arthropoda
- Clade: †Artiopoda
- Class: †Trilobita
- Order: †Corynexochida
- Family: †Styginidae
- Genus: †Bumastus; Murchison, 1839

Type species
- Bumastus barriensis Murchison, 1839

Species
- See text

= Bumastus =

Bumastus Temporal range: Early Ordovician to Late Silurian

Extinct genus of trilobites

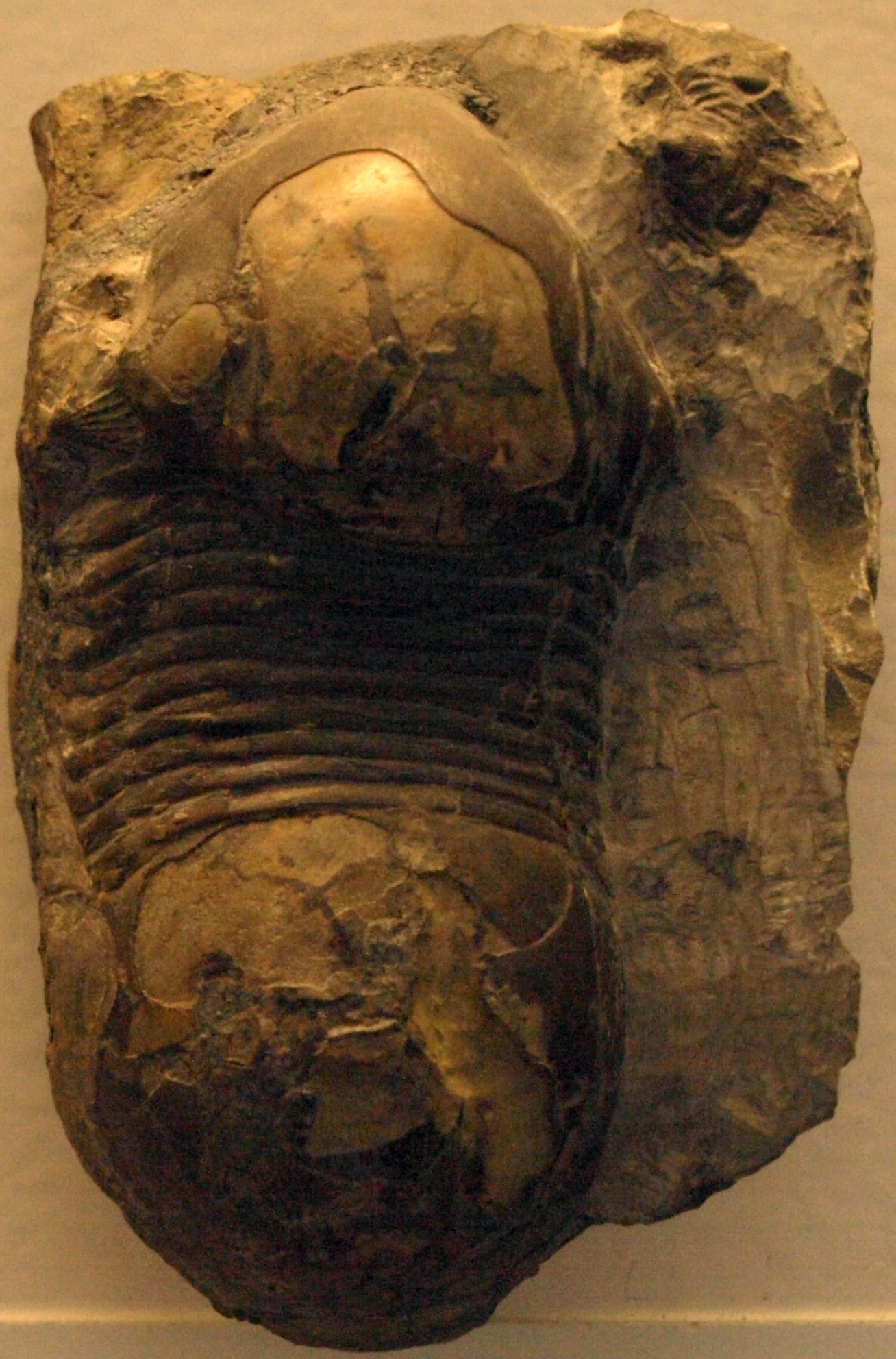
Bumastus barriensis, from the Silurian Wenlock series, found at Dudley, Worcestershire.

Bumastus is an extinct genus of corynexochid trilobites which existed from the Early Ordovician period to the Late Silurian period. They were relatively large trilobites, reaching a length of 6 in (15 cm). They were distinctive for their highly globular, smooth-surfaced exoskeleton. They possessed well-developed, large compound eyes and were believed to have dwelled in shallow-water sediments in life.

Bumastus fossils have been found in North and South America, Europe, Asia, and Australia. They are classified under the family Styginidae in the order Corynexochida.

== Description ==
Bumastus is a large trilobite, reaching a length of 6 in (15 cm). The body is oblong-oval, about twice as long as it is wide, It had a strongly convex profile, giving it its distinctive globular appearance.

Like all trilobites, the body is divided into three functional segments known as tagmata (singular: tagma), which in turn are divided into three lobes - the central lobe (axial) and two lateral lobes (pleural). Aside from faint depressions in the thorax, Bumastus is unusual in that the three lobes are barely discernible from each other. The axial lobe of Bumastus is also very broad in comparison to the pleural lobes.

The cephalon (head segment) is very large and strongly convex. The facial sutures (the divisions by which the cephalon splits when the trilobite molts) is opisthoparian, with the suture ending along the hind cephalic margin. The genal angles of the cephalon - the edges where the lateral and rear margins of the cephalon meet - are rounded. The cephalon is effaced (smooth and mostly featureless), an evolutionary trend also seen in Illaenus and Trimerus, though not as pronounced as that of Bumastus. The glabella (the central lobe of the head) is almost fused to the fixigena.

The thorax has ten narrow segments while the pygidium (the tail) is smooth and very rounded. It is isopygous - that is, the pygidium is about the same size as the cephalon. The pygidium completely lacks any visible trilobation. It is usually semicircular in shape but can be pointed in some species like B. niagarensis.

The smooth compound eyes are large and peculiarly well-developed. This, along with the rounded contours of their body, suggests that Bumastus may have spent most of its time buried in sediment with its eyes protruding.

The surface of the exoskeleton of most species is studded with minute punctures.

== Paleoecology ==
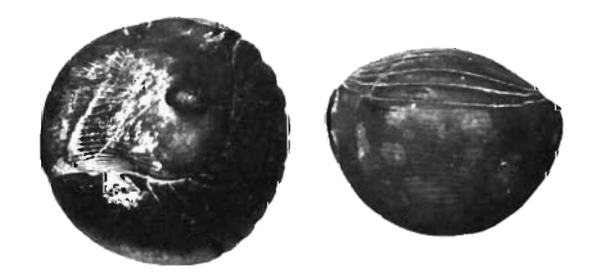
Side and ventral views of an enrolled specimen of Bumastus beckeri from Iowa.

The rounded smooth shape of Bumastus, as well as the almost complete effacement of its cephalon, is believed to have been an adaptation for burrowing. The presence of well-developed eyes also suggest that it may have kept them above the substrate by burrowing into sediments backward. They are situated in such a way that they provide the trilobite with a semicircular field of vision on each side, keeping them aware of movements near them.

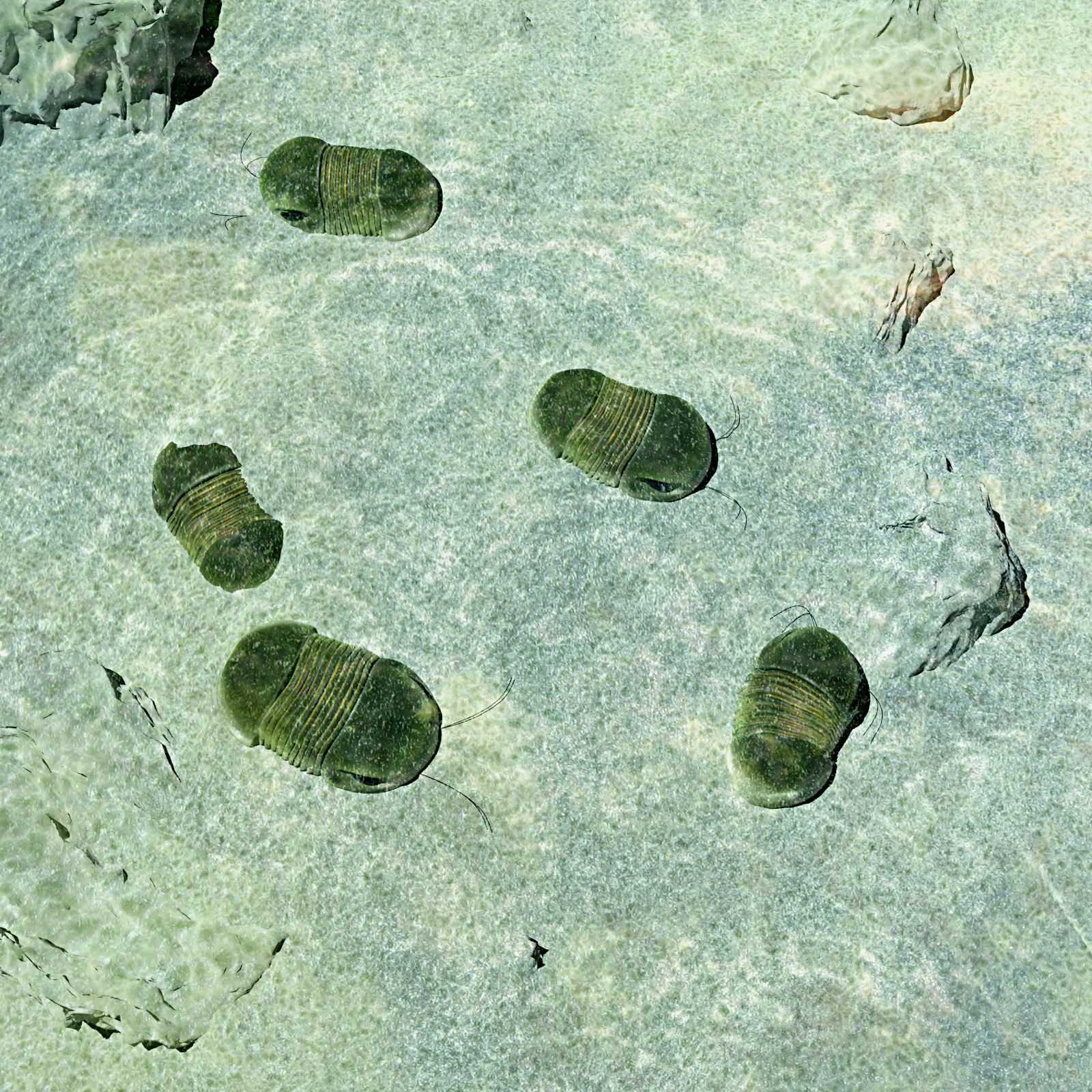
An artist's reconstruction of several individuals of Bumastus in shallow water. Bumastus were believed to have burrowed backwards into the sediment, leaving only their well-developed compound eyes exposed.

Bumastus could also curl up (known as enrollment) into a ball-like shape. This is believed to indicate that its habitat might have been the shallow waters of the Littoral zone. When waves wash them out from the sediments it could simply roll up and be carried along. Enrollment protects the softer body parts below the exoskeleton, while the spherical shape offers the least resistance to wave action.

Bumastus is a bottom-dwelling (nektobenthic) trilobite. It was probably either detritivorous, feeding on decomposing organic material drifting down in the currents, or carnivorous.

== Occurrence ==
Bumastus existed during the Paleozoic era, from the Arenigian epoch of the Early Ordovician period to the Ludlow epoch of the Late Silurian period (approximately 478.6 ± 1.7 to 418.7 ± 2.8 million years ago). Their fossils can be found worldwide.

Specimens have been recorded from the Silurian of Argentina, Canada, the Czech Republic, Estonia, Greenland, Kazakhstan, Norway, the Russian Federation, Sweden, Ukraine, the United Kingdom, and the United States.

They can also be found in the Ordovician formations of Australia, Canada, China, the Czech Republic, the Russian Federation, Spain, the United States; with specific occurrences from the Dobrotivian age/stage (Llandeilo age) of China and France, and the Whiterockian stage of the United States.

They are typically found in reef limestone, though they are sometimes found in crinoidal limestone.

== Discovery ==
Bumastus was first described by the Scottish geologist, Sir Roderick Impey Murchison in 1839. The type species, Bumastus barriensis was recovered from the Coalbrookdale Formation of the Wenlock Group in England.

Murchison first believed that the specimens he discovered (including a large 5 in (13 cm) by 3.5 in (8.9 cm) specimen) belonged to the genus Isotelus because of the size, shape, and almost featureless cephalon. But he noted the almost absent trilobation of body and the difference in the number of segments in the thorax (10 in B. barriensis and 8 in Isotelus). He also recognized its close relationship with the genus Illaenus, but ultimately classified it as a new genus based on the extremely advanced state of effacement in the cephalon of Bumastus.

The genus is so named because of its curious resemblance to a large round grape. It comes from Latin būmastus (large grapes that resemble the udders of a cow), which in turn came from Greek βοῦς (bous - cow) and μαστός (mastós - breasts). The word was familiar in the English language during Murchison's time, being a word encountered in book two of Virgil's Georgics.

The specific name of the type species, barriensis, roughly meaning "of Barr", comes from its common name among collectors. It was then known as the "Barr trilobite" referring to the plentiful occurrence of B. barriensis in the limestone formations of Great Barr, Staffordshire.

== Taxonomy ==
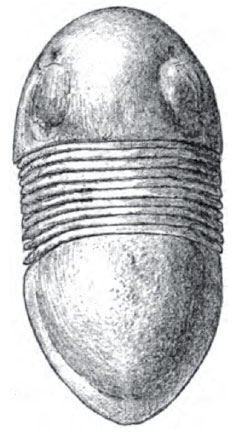
Bumastus niagarensis from Wauwatosa, Wisconsin, has a more pointed pygidium.

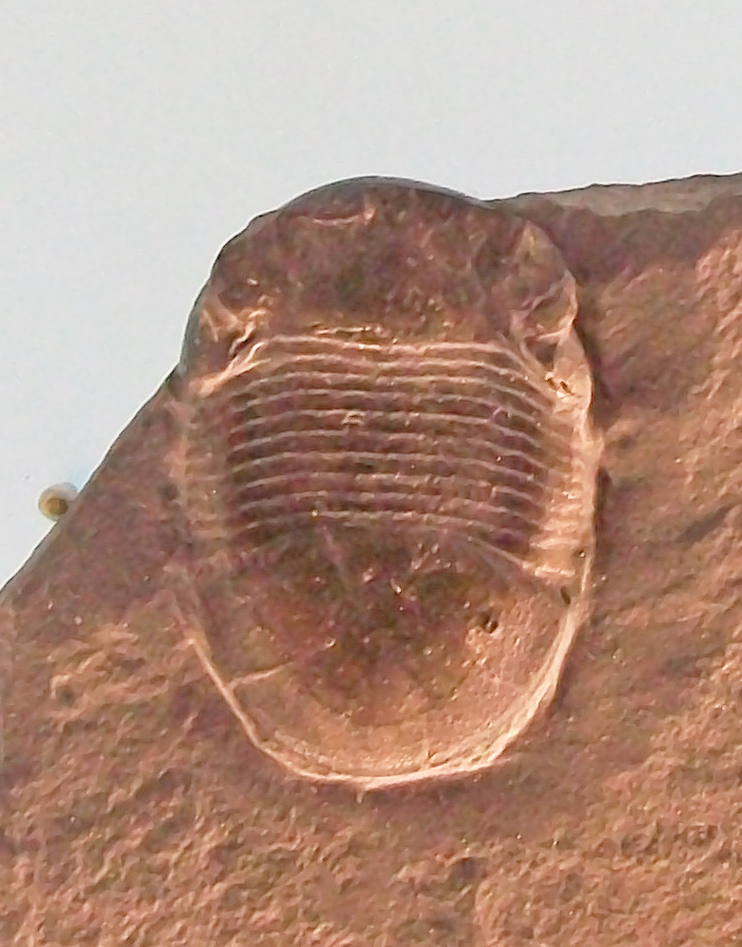
Bumastus ioxus from Middleport, New York in the Field Museum of Natural History.

Bumastus is classified under the family Styginidae by P.A. Jell and J.M. Adrain in 2003, and under the order Corynexochida of trilobites by Jack Sepkoski in 2002.

== Species ==
Listed below are the species classified under Bumastus and the countries of their recorded type localities. The list is incomplete and may be inaccurate.

- Bumastus armatus - United States
- Bumastus barriensis - Estonia, Kazakhstan, Ukraine, United Kingdom, United States
- Bumastus beckeri - United States
- Bumastus bellmanni - Argentina
- Bumastus bouchardi - Czech Republic, Ukraine
- Bumastus chicagoensis - United States
- Bumastus cuniculus - United States
  - Bumastus cuniculus|Bumastus cuniculus vieillensis - Canada
- Bumastus dayi - United States
- Bumastus erastusi - Canada
- Bumastus globosus - Canada, United States (Synonym (biology)|synonym?:Illaenus globosus)
- Bumastus graftonensis - United States
- Burmatus Harrisi - United states
- Bumastus hornyi - Czech Republic
- Bumastus indeterminatus - Canada
- Bumastus insignis - United Kingdom, United States
- Bumastus ioxus - United States
- Bumastus lenzi - Canada
- Bumastus limbatus - United States
- Bumastus milleri - United States
- Bumastus niagarensis - United States
- Bumastus orbicaudatus - Canada, United States
- Bumastus phrix - Estonia, Ukraine, United Kingdom
- Bumastus springfieldensis - United States
- Bumastus sulcatus - Sweden
- Bumastus tenuirugosus - Canada
- Bumastus tenuis - United States
- Bumastus transversalis - United States
- Bumastus trentonensis - United States
