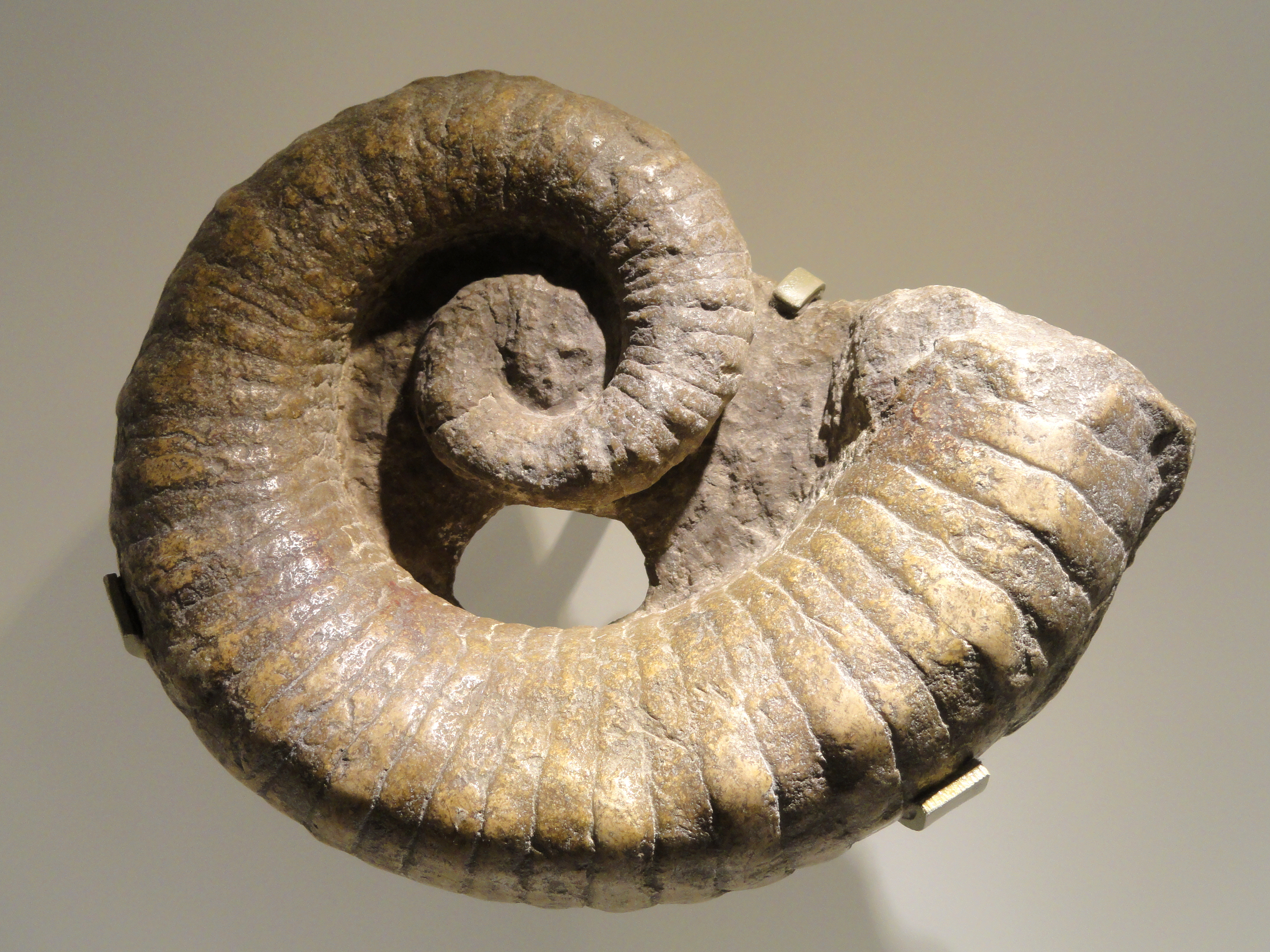
- Aphetoceras americanus fossil
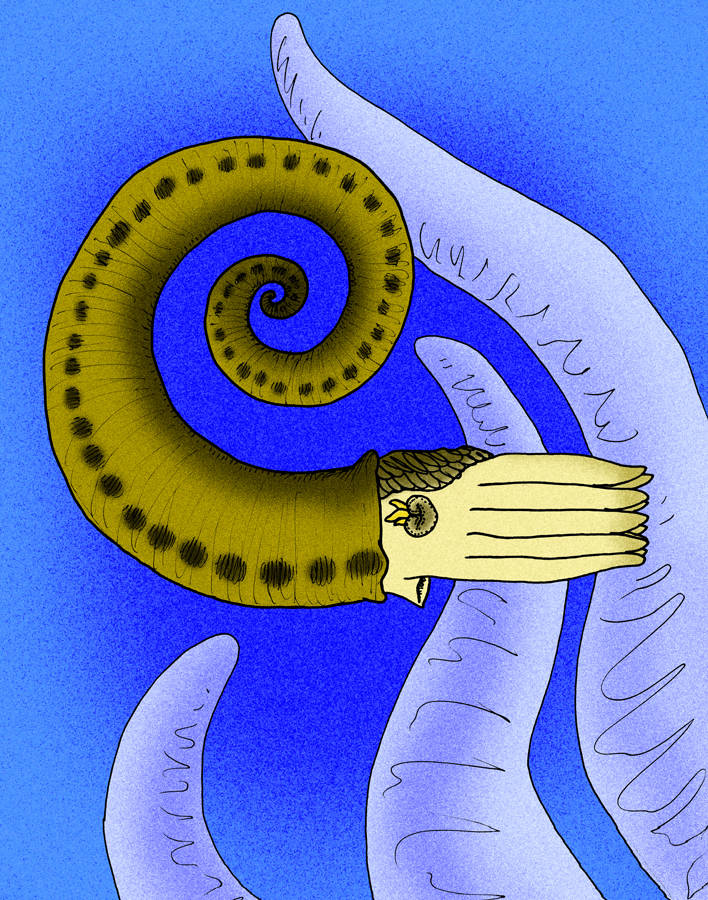
- Artist's reconstruction of A. americanum

Scientific classification
- Kingdom: Animalia
- Phylum: Mollusca
- Class: Cephalopoda
- Subclass: Nautiloidea
- Order: †Ellesmerocerida
- Family: †Ellesmeroceratidae
- Genus: †Aphetoceras; Hyatt, 1894

= Aphetoceras =

Aphetoceras Temporal range: Early Ordovician

Extinct genus of molluscs

Aphetoceras, from Ancient Greek ἄφετος (áphetos), meaning "loose", and κέρας (kéras), meaning "horn", is a genus of tarphycerid cephalopod within the Estonioceratidae; loosely coiled without an impression along the dorsal margin; early whorls barely reaching, separating then diverging in the final mature whorl; weakly ribbed in some. The cross section of Aphetoceras is higher than wide, making it compressed in form. The dorsum, along the inner curve, is more broadly rounded than the venter which lies along the outer curve. The siphuncle is relatively large, located near but not at the ventral margin; lined with secondary deposits. Chambers are empty.

Aphetoceras is similar in outline to the related Estonioceras and Alaskoceras but most similar in cross section to Clytoceras.

Aphetoceras comes from the Lower Ordovician of North America and Australia and is one of the earlier tarphycerids found in the Lower Ordovician El Paso Group in New Mexico.
