= Campendoceras =

Campendoceras Temporal range: LOrd (U Canad)

Scientific classification
- Kingdom: Animalia
- Phylum: Mollusca
- Class: Cephalopoda
- Subclass: Nautiloidea
- Order: †Endocerida
- Family: †Proterocameroceratidae
- Genus: †Campendoceras; Teichert & Glenister, 1954

Extinct genus of molluscs

Campendoceras is a genus of proterocameroceratids from the Lower Ordovician of NW Australia and possibly Estonia that can be recognized by its slender, weakly endogastric, longiconic and annulate shell and large marginal siphuncle that contains endocones.

The curvature in Campendoceras is less distinct than that in Clitendoceras or Mcqueenoceras and the siphuncle is larger.
