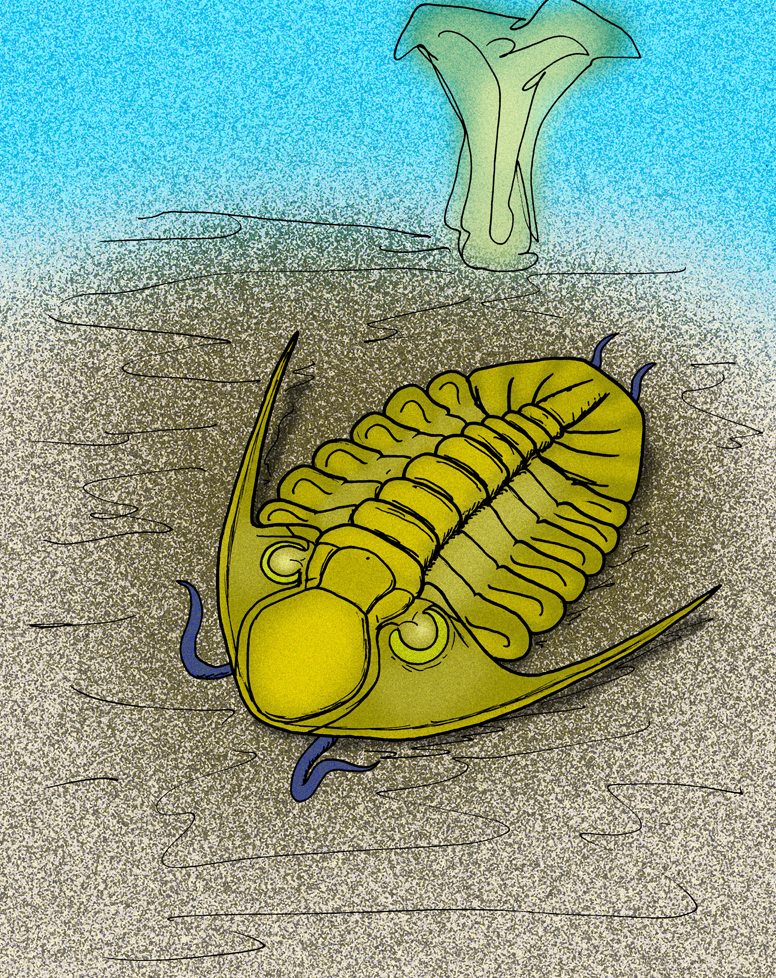
- Artist's reconstruction

Scientific classification
- Kingdom: Animalia
- Phylum: Arthropoda
- Clade: †Artiopoda
- Class: †Trilobita
- Order: †Asaphida
- Family: †Asaphidae
- Genus: †Norasaphus
- Species: †N. monroeae

Binomial name
- †Norasaphus monroeae Fortey & Shergold, 1984

= Norasaphus monroeae =

Norasaphus monroeae Temporal range: Arenig

Species of trilobite

Norasaphus monroeae is a species of asaphid trilobite named after Marilyn Monroe for its hourglass-like shaped glabellum. Its fossils are found in Arenig-aged marine strata from the Nora Formation, in the Georgina Basin, situated between the Northern Territory and Queensland, Australia.

== See also ==
- List of organisms named after famous people (born 1925–1949)
