= Aethoceras =

Aethoceras Temporal range: late Early Ordovician

Scientific classification
- Kingdom: Animalia
- Phylum: Mollusca
- Class: Cephalopoda
- Subclass: Nautiloidea
- Order: †Tarphycerida
- Family: †Estonioceratidae
- Genus: †Aethoceras; Teichert & Glenister, 1954

Genus of molluscs

Aethoceras is a genus of Tarphycerida nautiloids included in the family Estonioceratidae for which the shell is a loosely coiled, gradually expanding dextral torticone with a slightly depressed whorl section. Siphuncle small, ventral, submarginal. Whorl section somewhat resembles early stages of Estonioceras in being laterally fanged. Trochoidal coiling brings to mind the later Trocholitidae. Aethoceras was originally found in the lower Ordovician of Western Australia.
