= Lapidaria =

Lapidaria may refer to:

- Lapidaria (plant), a genus of succulent plant in the family Aizoaceae
- Lapidaria (trilobite), a genus of extinct trilobites
- Lapidaria (vicus), an Ancient Roman vicus in the province of Raetia (now Switzerland)

== See also ==
- Lapidarium, a collection of stone monuments of archaeological interest
