= Baltoceras =

Baltoceras Temporal range: M-U Ordovician

Scientific classification
- Kingdom: Animalia
- Phylum: Mollusca
- Class: Cephalopoda
- Order: †Orthocerida
- Family: †Baltoceratidae
- Genus: †Baltoceras; Holm 1897

Genus of molluscs

Baltoceras is a member of the Ellesmerocerida, included in the family, Baltoceratidae. The shell of Baltoceras is slender with a subcircular cross section, straight transverse sutures, and a large siphuncle in contact with the venter. Septal necks are short but not vestigial; connecting rings are thick; endosiphonal organic deposits are unknown.

Baltoceras ranges in age from Whiterock to Chazy (Middle Ordovician). The few species known are from the upper Pogonip Limestone of Nevada, the Day Point Limestone of New York, and the “Orthoceras limestone” of the Baltic region of Europe.

Baltoceras differs from Rioceras in the same family in that Baltoceras has deeper camerae, longer septal necks and thinner connecting rings. Also Rioceras is earlier, mostly late Canadian in age.

It should not be confused with the orthocerid, Balticoceras.
