= Annamitella =

Annamitella Temporal range: Arenig

Scientific classification
- Domain: Eukaryota
- Kingdom: Animalia
- Phylum: Arthropoda
- Class: †Trilobita
- Order: †Corynexochida
- Family: †Leiostegiidae
- Genus: †Annamitella; Mansuy, 1916

Extinct genus of trilobite

Annamitella is a genus of trilobite, extinct marine arthropods. Annamitella lived from the Arenig to the Llandeilo age of the Ordovician Period from 478.6 to 460.9 million years ago.

== Distribution ==
The genus has been reported from:

- Molles, San Juan and Suri Formations, Argentina
- Nora Formation, Australia
- Dawan, Honghuayuan, Laozai, Xiaqiaojia, Duoquanshan, Yingou, Yehli and Shihtzupu Formations, China
- Alakul and Uzunbulak Formations, Kazakhstan
