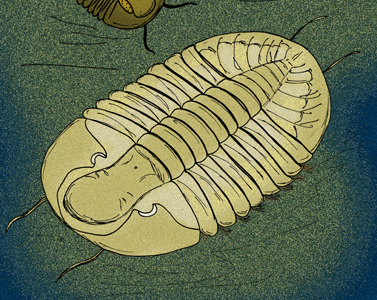
- Artist's reconstruction

Scientific classification
- Domain: Eukaryota
- Kingdom: Animalia
- Phylum: Arthropoda
- Class: †Trilobita
- Order: †Asaphida
- Family: †Asaphidae
- Genus: †Gog; Fortey, 1975

Species
- Gog catillus Fortey, 1975; Gog yangtzeensis

= Gog (trilobite) =

Gog Temporal range: Middle to Late Arenig

Extinct genus of trilobites

Gog is a genus of large, flattened asaphid trilobite from the Middle Arenig-aged Svalbard, Valhallfonna Formation, Olenidsletta, Member, of Spitzbergen, Norway (G. catillus), and the Upper Arenig-aged Dawan Formation in Hubei, China (G. yangtzeensis).
