= Merlinia =

Merlinia Temporal range: Early Arenig

Scientific classification
- Domain: Eukaryota
- Kingdom: Animalia
- Phylum: Arthropoda
- Class: †Trilobita
- Order: †Asaphida
- Family: †Asaphidae
- Genus: †Merlinia; Fortey & Owens, 1987

Extinct genus of trilobites

Merlinia is an extinct genus from a well-known class of fossil marine arthropods, the trilobites. It lived during the early part of the Arenig stage of the Ordovician Period, a faunal stage which lasted from approximately 478 to 471 million years ago. These trilobites were named after the Welsh wizard Merlin, as the fossilised tails (pygidia) of trilobites were often mistaken for petrified butterflies, and were hence linked with mythological tales involving Merlin.
