= Zuninaspis =

Zuninaspis Temporal range: Arenig

Scientific classification
- Domain: Eukaryota
- Kingdom: Animalia
- Phylum: Arthropoda
- Class: †Trilobita
- Order: †Asaphida
- Family: †Asaphidae
- Genus: †Zuninaspis; Harrington and Leanza 1957

Species
- Z. acuminata

Extinct genus of trilobites

Zuninaspis is an extinct genus of trilobite arthropod. It lived during the Arenig stage of the Ordovician Period, approximately 478 to 471 million years ago in what is now Argentina.
