= Zoraspis =

Zoraspis Temporal range: Early Ordovician–Early Ordovician

Scientific classification
- Domain: Eukaryota
- Kingdom: Animalia
- Phylum: Arthropoda
- Class: †Trilobita
- Order: †Asaphida
- Family: †Asaphidae
- Genus: †Zoraspis; Nan, 1985

Species
- Z. lobata

Extinct genus of trilobites

Zoraspis is a genus of Asaphidae trilobite described from China. The genus contains a single species Zoraspis lobata which was described in 1985 from the Early Ordovician Huangbanjishan Formation in Heilongjiang province.
