= Eleutherocentrus =

Eleutherocentrus Temporal range: Late Arenig

Scientific classification
- Kingdom: Animalia
- Phylum: Arthropoda
- Clade: †Artiopoda
- Class: †Trilobita
- Order: †Proetida
- Family: †Bathyuridae
- Genus: †Eleutherocentrus; Clark, 1935

Eleutherocentrus is an extinct genus from the trilobites, a class of fossil marine arthropods. It lived during the later part of the Arenig stage of the Ordovician Period, approximately 478 to 471 million years ago.
