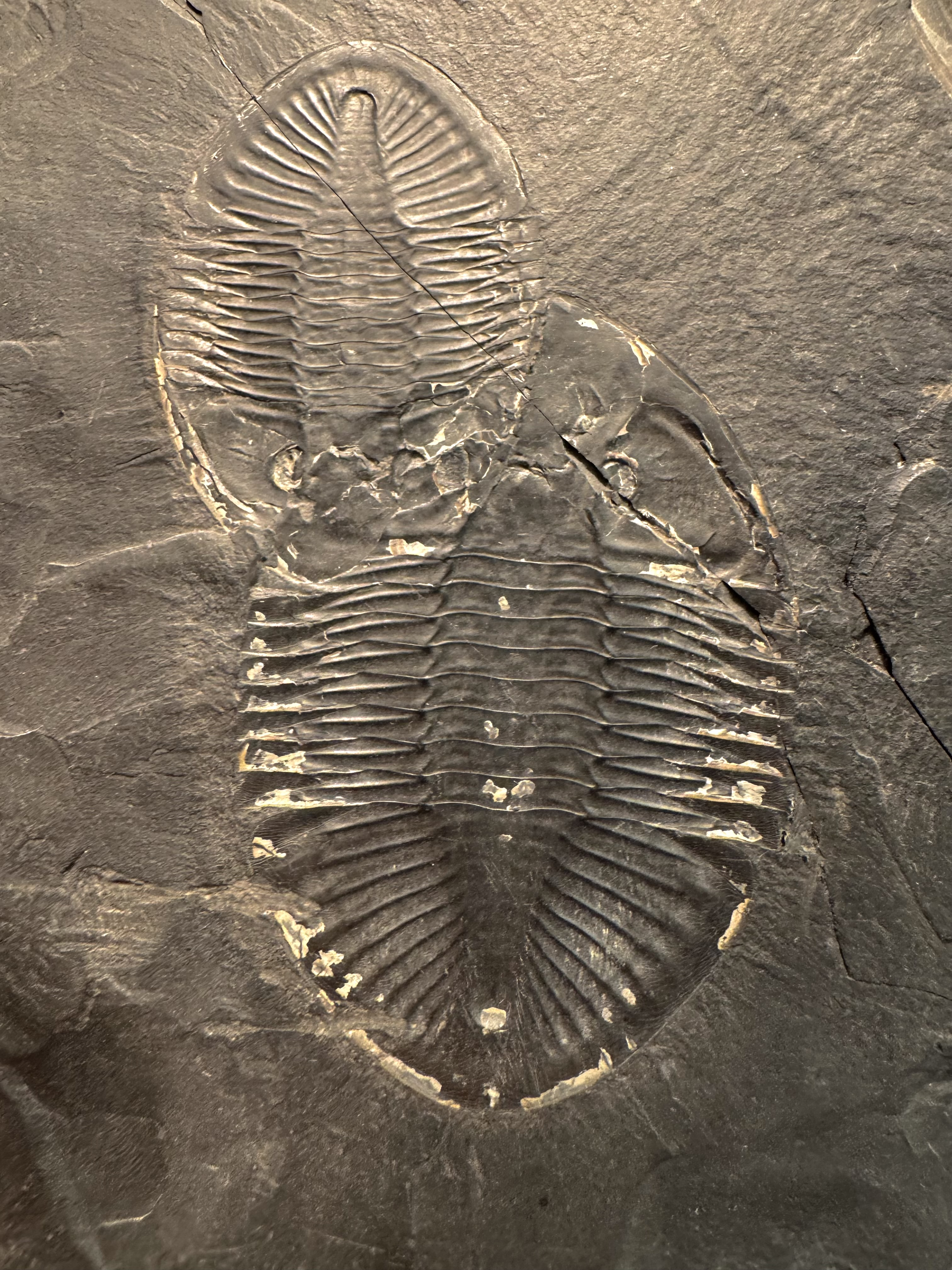

Scientific classification
- Kingdom: Animalia
- Phylum: Arthropoda
- Clade: †Artiopoda
- Class: †Trilobita
- Order: †Asaphida
- Family: †Asaphidae
- Genus: †Pseudogygites; Kobayashi, 1934

Type species
- Asaphus canadensis Chapman, 1856

= Pseudogygites =

Pseudogygites Temporal range: Middle Ordovician–Upper Ordovician

Extinct genus of trilobites

Pseudogygites is an extinct genus of trilobites from the Middle and Upper Ordovician.

== Description ==
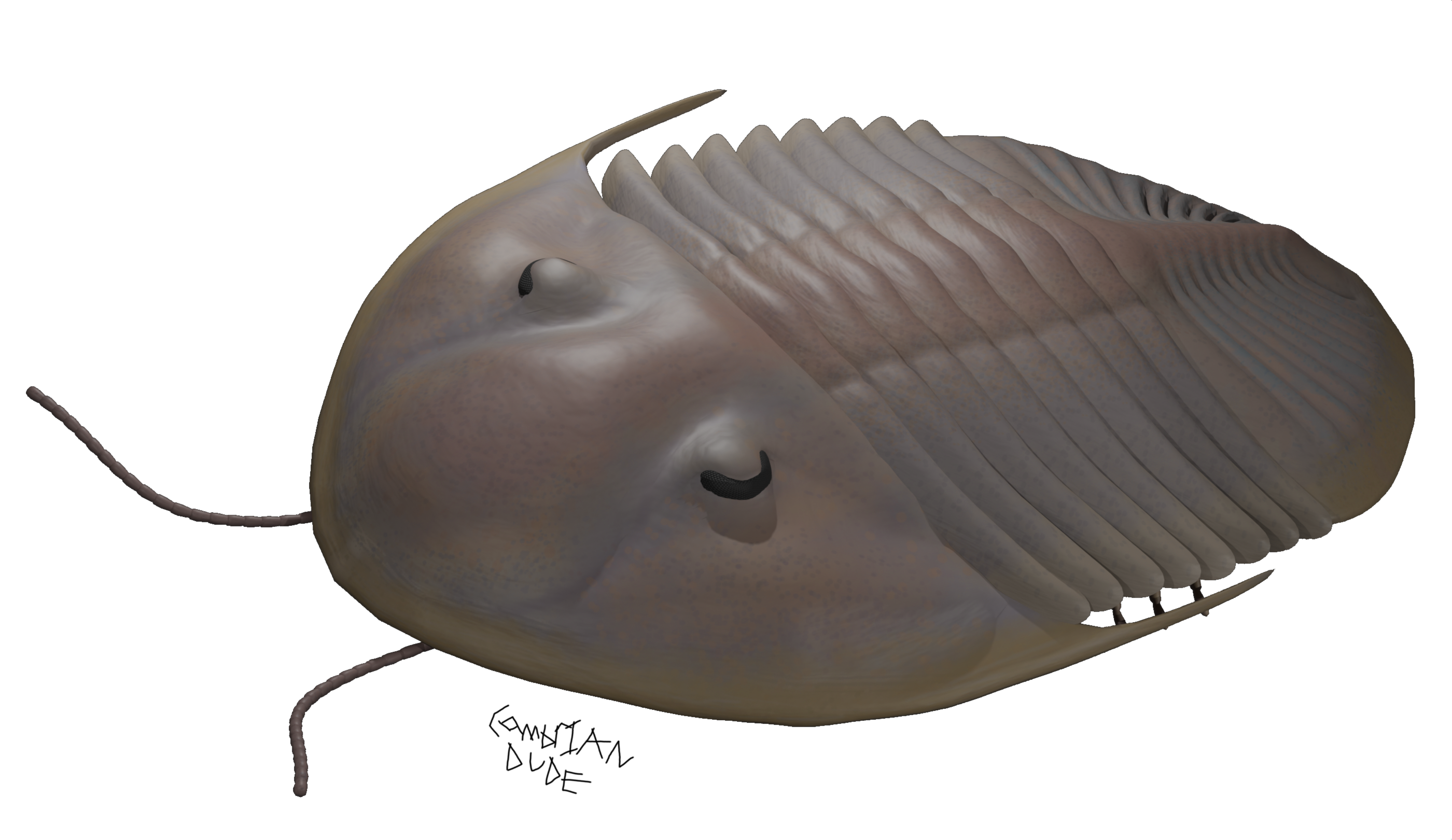
Reconstruction of Pseudogygites.

The pygidium and the cephalon are about equal in size and shape. The glabella is expanded forward, reaching to the anterior margin. Pseudogygites has short genal spines and small compound eyes located in the center of the cephalon with the glabella in between. The pygidium contains faint pleural furrows and no axial rings. Pseudogygites species can reach 25 centimetres (10 in) in length and 10 cm (4 in) in width.

== Distribution ==
Pseudogygites is found in late Ordovician oil shales in New York, Ontario, and Southampton Island in the Canadian Arctic.

== Species ==
Four species have been described:

- Pseudogygites latimarginatus (Hall, 1847)
- Pseudogygites hudsoni
- Pseudogygites akpatokensis
- Pseudogygites arcticus
