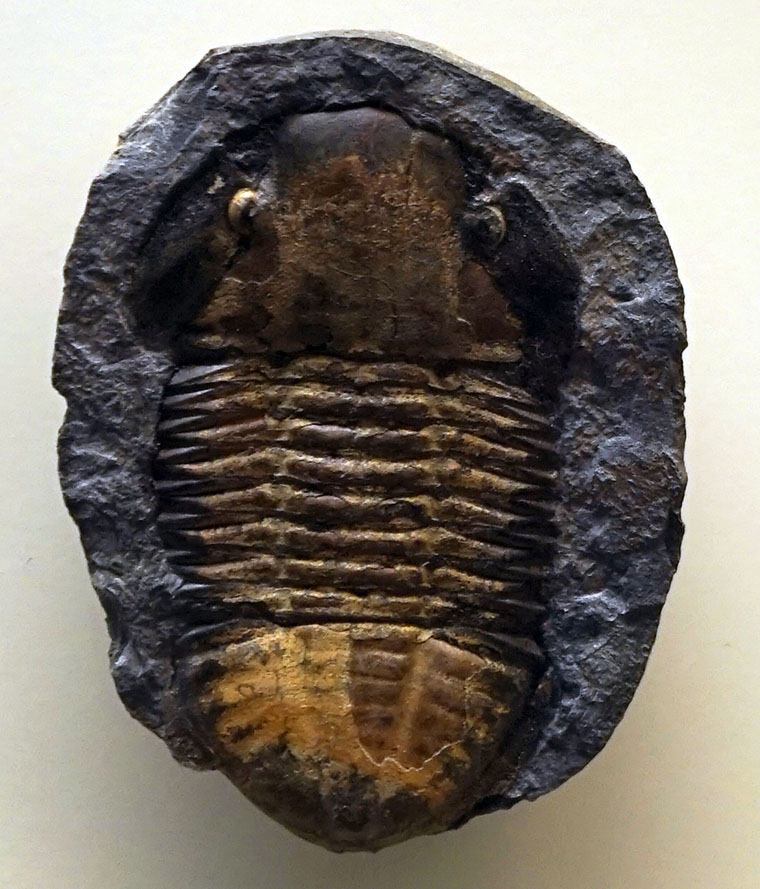
- Hoekaspis sp.

Scientific classification
- Domain: Eukaryota
- Kingdom: Animalia
- Phylum: Arthropoda
- Class: †Trilobita
- Order: †Asaphida
- Family: †Asaphidae
- Genus: †Hoekaspis; Kobayashi, 1937

Species
- H. megacantha; H. schlagintweiti

= Hoekaspis =

Hoekaspis Temporal range: Ordovician; Early Arenig

Extinct genus of trilobites

Hoekaspis is an extinct genus of trilobites from the family Asaphidae. It lived during the early part of the Arenig stage of the Ordovician, a faunal stage which lasted from approximately 466 to 461 million years ago.

== Distribution ==
Fossils of Hoekaspis have been found in France, Morocco, Bolivia and Argentina.
