= Hunnebergia =

Hunnebergia Temporal range: Early Arenig

Scientific classification
- Domain: Eukaryota
- Kingdom: Animalia
- Phylum: Arthropoda
- Class: †Trilobita
- Order: †Asaphida
- Family: †Asaphidae
- Genus: †Hunnebergia; Tjernvik, 1956

Extinct genus of trilobites

Hunnebergia is an extinct genus from a well-known class of fossil marine arthropods, the trilobites. It lived during the early part of the Arenig stage of the Ordovician Period, a faunal stage which lasted from approximately 478 to 471 million years ago.
