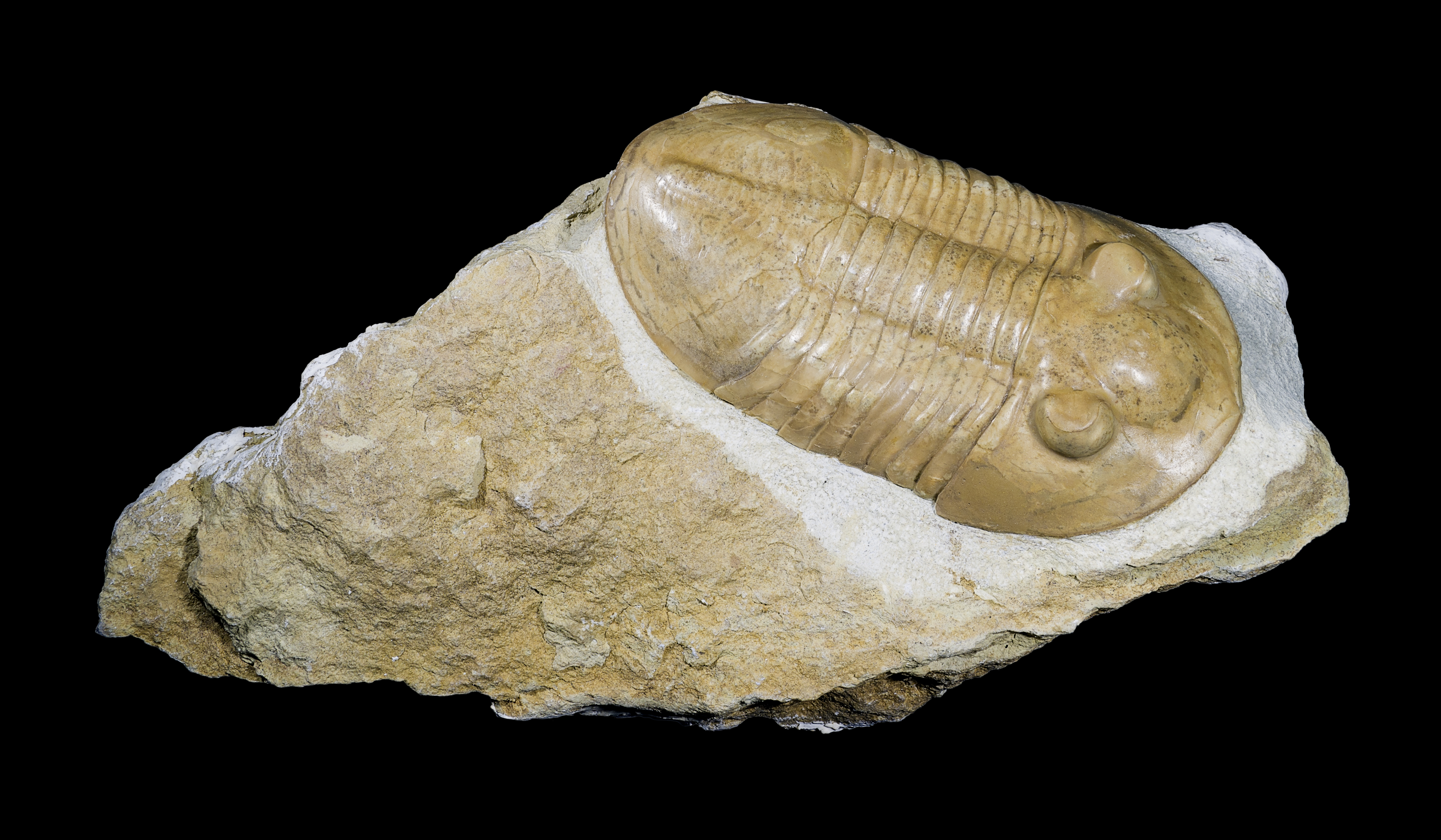

Scientific classification
- Kingdom: Animalia
- Phylum: Arthropoda
- Clade: †Artiopoda
- Class: †Trilobita
- Order: †Asaphida
- Family: †Asaphidae
- Genus: †Pseudoasaphus; Schmidt, 1904

= Pseudoasaphus =

Pseudoasaphus Temporal range: 467.3–456.8 Ma

Genus of trilobites

Pseudoasaphus is an extinct genus of trilobites from the Ordovician.
