= Ceratolithus =

Ceratolithus Temporal range: Arenig

Scientific classification
- Kingdom: Animalia
- Phylum: Arthropoda
- Clade: †Artiopoda
- Class: †Trilobita
- Order: †Asaphida
- Genus: †Ceratolithus; Lu, 1959

Species
- C. cornutus Lu, 1959 (type)

Extinct genus of trilobites

Ceratolithus is an extinct genus from a well-known class of fossil marine arthropods, the trilobites. It lived during the later part of the Arenig stage of the Ordovician Period, approximately 478 to 471 million years ago.

== Distribution ==
Ceratolithus has been found in the Lower Ordovician of China (Arenig, Meitan Formation, Central Sichuan).

== Taxonomy ==
=== Taxa that may be confused with Ceratolithus ===
The haptophyte genus Ceratolithus.
