= Valhalloceras =

Valhalloceras Temporal range: Early Ordovician

Scientific classification
- Kingdom: Animalia
- Phylum: Mollusca
- Class: Cephalopoda
- Subclass: Nautiloidea
- Order: Oncocerida
- Family: Phthanoncoceratidae
- Genus: Valhalloceras Evans & King, 1990
- Species: V. floweri

Binomial name
- Valhalloceras floweri Evans & King, 1990

Extinct genus of molluscs

Valhalloceras is a genus of nautiloid cephalopods found only in upper Lower Ordovician, Arenigian, carbonates on Svalbard Island and Jan Mayen Island. The type and only species so far named is Valhalloceras floweri Evans and King 1990.

Valhalloceras is assigned to the Oncocerida, it and the related genus Phthanoncoceras are united in the family Phthanoncoceratidae.
