= Anataphrus =

Scientific classification
- Domain: Eukaryota
- Kingdom: Animalia
- Phylum: Arthropoda
- Class: †Trilobita
- Order: †Asaphida
- Family: †Asaphidae
- Genus: †Anataphrus; Whittington, 1954

Extinct genus of trilobites

Anataphrus is an extinct genus of trilobites in the family Asaphidae.

== Species ==
These four species belong to the genus Anataphrus:

- † Anataphrus borraeus Whittington, 1954
- † Anataphrus kermiti Amati, 2014
- † Anataphrus martinensis Ross & Shaw, 1972
- † Anataphrus megalophrys Amati, 2014
