= Falanaspis =

Falanaspis Temporal range: Early Arenig

Scientific classification
- Kingdom: Animalia
- Phylum: Arthropoda
- Clade: †Artiopoda
- Class: †Trilobita
- Order: †Asaphida
- Family: †Alsataspididae
- Genus: †Falanaspis; Tjernvik, 1956

Falanaspis is an extinct genus from a well-known class of fossil marine arthropods, the trilobites. It lived during the early part of the Arenig stage of the Ordovician Period, a faunal stage which lasted from approximately 478 to 471 million years ago.
