= Australopyge =

Australopyge Temporal range: Arenig

Scientific classification
- Domain: Eukaryota
- Kingdom: Animalia
- Phylum: Arthropoda
- Class: †Trilobita
- Order: †Asaphida
- Family: †Asaphidae
- Genus: †Australopyge; Harrington & Leanza, 1957

Species
- A. acanthura; A. russoi

Extinct genus of trilobites

Australopyge is an extinct genus from a well-known class of fossil marine arthropods, the trilobites. It lived during the Arenig stage of the Ordovician Period, approximately 478 to 471 million years ago.
