= Niobe (trilobite) =

Niobe Temporal range: 488.3–457.5 Ma

Scientific classification
- Domain: Eukaryota
- Kingdom: Animalia
- Phylum: Arthropoda
- Class: †Trilobita
- Order: †Asaphida
- Family: †Asaphidae
- Genus: †Niobe; Angelin, 1851

Species
- N. brevicauda; N. flabellifera; N. groenlandica; N. morrisi; N. occulta; N. quadraticaudata

Genus of arthropods (fossil)

Niobe is a genus of trilobites in the family Asaphidae.
