= Etheridgaspis =

Etheridgaspis Temporal range: Arenig

Scientific classification
- Kingdom: Animalia
- Phylum: Arthropoda
- Clade: †Artiopoda
- Class: †Trilobita
- Order: †Proetida
- Family: †Hystricuridae
- Genus: †Etheridgaspis; Kobayashi 1940

Extinct genus of trilobites

Etheridgaspis is an extinct genus from a well-known class of fossil marine arthropods, the trilobites. It lived during the Arenig stage of the Ordovician Period, approximately 478 to 471 million years ago. Fossils of the genus have been found exclusively in the Caroline Creek Formation of Australia.
