= Estlandia =

Scientific classification
- Kingdom: Animalia
- Phylum: Brachiopoda
- Class: †Strophomenata
- Order: †Billingsellida
- Family: †Gonambonitidae
- Genus: †Estlandia; Schuchert & Cooper, 1931

Species
- †Estlandia hispida Zuykov & Hints, 2002; †Estlandia marginata Pahlen, 1877; †Estlandia pyron Eichwald, 1840; †Estlandia seidlitzi Rubel, 1963

Genus of brachiopods

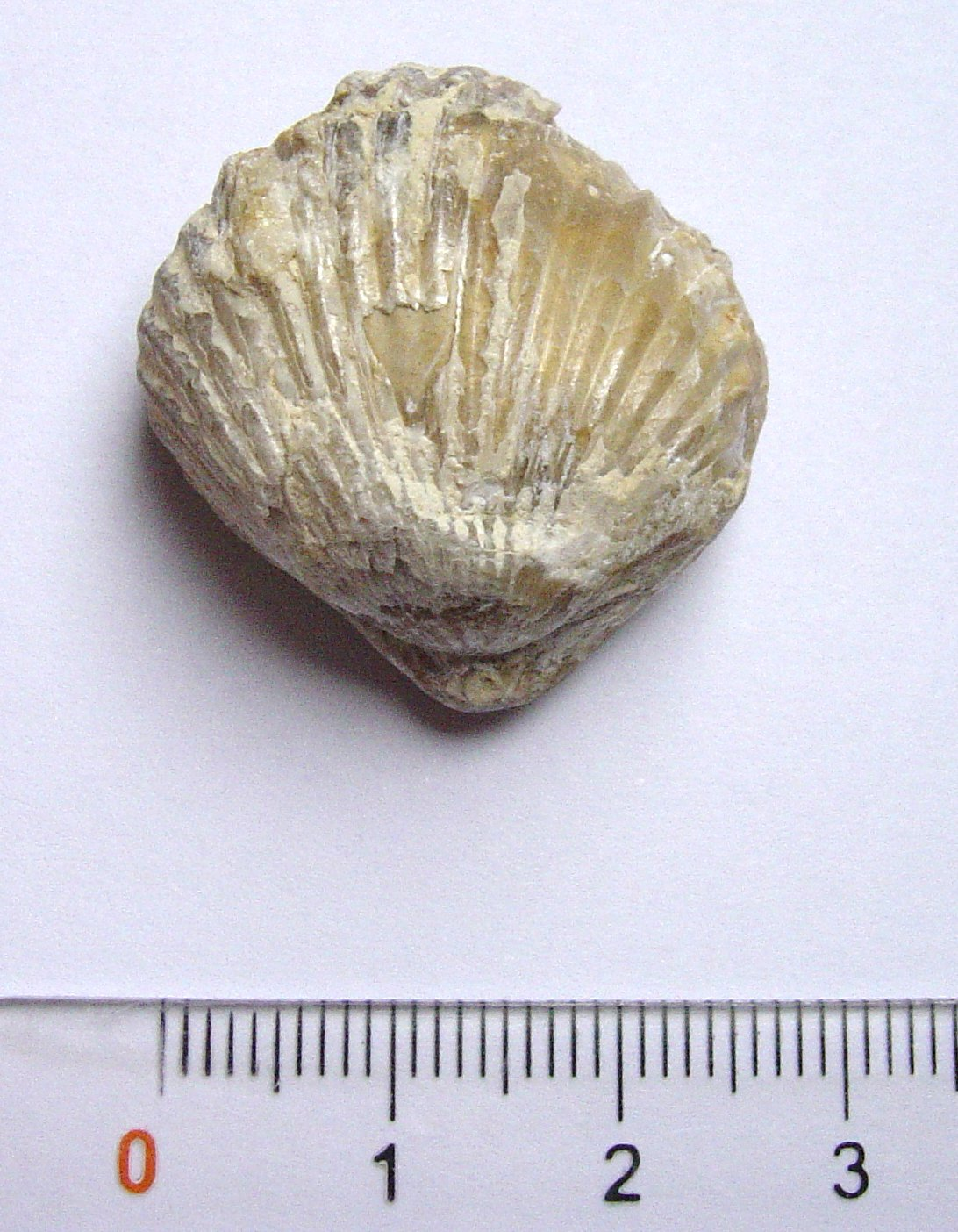
An example of a brachiopod shell fossil

Estlandia is a gonambonitid genus. It is one of the endemic brachiopods in the Ordovician of Baltoscandia. Currently, eight different species and subspecies of the genus have been recorded from the Aseri to Keila stages.

The distribution of the genus Estlandia is confined to the Middle and Upper Ordovician of the North Estonian Confacies Belt and the northwestern part of the Moscow Basin.

The first notes on Estlandia date back to 1840. The genus name was first published in 1931.
