= Megalaspidella =

Megalaspidella Temporal range: Late Arenig

Scientific classification
- Domain: Eukaryota
- Kingdom: Animalia
- Phylum: Arthropoda
- Class: †Trilobita
- Order: †Asaphida
- Family: †Asaphidae
- Genus: †Megalaspidella; Kobayashi 1937

Species
- M. kayseri Kobayashi 1937

Extinct genus of trilobites

Megalaspidella is an extinct genus from a well-known class of fossil marine arthropods, the trilobites. It lived during the later part of the Arenig stage of the Ordovician Period, approximately 478 to 471 million years ago.
