= Antigonambonites =

Antigonambonites Temporal range: Ordovician

Scientific classification
- Kingdom: Animalia
- Phylum: Brachiopoda
- Class: †Strophomenata
- Order: †Billingsellida
- Family: †Polytoechiidae
- Genus: †Antigonambonites; Opik, 1934

Species
- Antigonambonites aequistriatus Gagel, 1890; Antigonambonites anna Opik, 1934; Antigonambonites costatus Opik, 1934; Antigonambonites maekulaensis Opik, 1934; Antigonambonites planus Pander, 1830; Antigonambonites soror Opik, 1934; Antigonambonites sulcatus Opik, 1934

Extinct genus of rhynchonelliform brachiopod

Antigonambonites is an extinct genus of rhynchonelliform brachiopod that lived during the Ordovician period.

== Description ==
Antigonambonites possessed what appears similar to a pedicle sheath secreted by a modified section of its ventral mantle, but it was not a homolog of the pedicle of rhynchonellates.
