= Tasmanocephalus =

Tasmanocephalus Temporal range: Early Arenig

Scientific classification
- Kingdom: Animalia
- Phylum: Arthropoda
- Clade: †Artiopoda
- Class: †Trilobita
- Order: †Ptychopariida
- Genus: †Tasmanocephalus; Kobayashi 1936

Extinct genus of trilobites

Tasmanocephalus is an extinct genus from a well-known class of fossil marine arthropods, the trilobites. It lived during the early part of the Arenig stage of the Ordovician Period, a faunal stage which lasted from approximately 478 to 471 million years ago. Fossils of the genus have been reported from the Karmberg and Caroline Creek Formations of Tasmania, Australia.
