= Bajkaloceras =

Bajkaloceras Temporal range: uL Ordovician

Scientific classification
- Kingdom: Animalia
- Phylum: Mollusca
- Class: Cephalopoda
- Subclass: Nautiloidea
- Order: ?Intejocerida
- Family: Bajkaloceratidae
- Genus: Bajkaloceras Balashov, 1962

Genus of nautiloids

Bajkaloceras is a straight-shelled orthoceroid, and possibly a member of the Intejocerida, from the Angara River basin in central Russia, named by Balashov in 1962. Its age, as given in the Treatise on Invertebrate Paleontology is Arenigian.

== Description ==
Bajkaloceras is characterized by an orthonic shell with an elliptical cross section and short camerae and a large, central to subctral siphuncle composed of moderately concave segments with short septal necks and apparently thin connecting rings. In the early growth stage, the interior of the siphuncle, is lined with calcareous deposits that seem to be outgrowths of the connecting rings, which are divided into numerous cells by longitudinal and transverse partitions.

== Taxonomic position ==
Bajkaloceras is the sole member and representative of the Bajkaloceratidae, proposed by Balashov, 1962, and given ordinal rank by Sheveyrev, 2006. Teichert (1964), in the Treatise, Pt K, included Bajkaloceras, and Bajkaloceratidae, along with Intejoceras, Evencoceras, and Padunoceras in the Intejocerida which he joined with the Endocerida in the Endoceratoidea. Flower (1976) separated these into two groups, calling attention to differences in siphuncle morphology and location. Thin connecting rings and the central or subcentral siphuncle separate Bajkaloceras form the endoceroids and suggest a close relationship with the Baltoceratidae or the Troedssonellidae
