= Lapidaria (trilobite) =

Lapidaria Temporal range: Arenig

Scientific classification
- Domain: Eukaryota
- Kingdom: Animalia
- Phylum: Arthropoda
- Class: †Trilobita
- Order: †Asaphida
- Family: †Asaphidae
- Genus: †Lapidaria; Tjernvik, 1956

Extinct genus of trilobites

Lapidaria is an extinct genus of trilobites. It lived during the Arenig stage of the Ordovician Period, approximately 478 to 471 million years ago.
