= Intejocerida =

Intejocerida Temporal range: L -M Ordovician

Scientific classification
- Kingdom: Animalia
- Phylum: Mollusca
- Class: Cephalopoda
- Subclass: Nautiloidea
- Family: †Intejocerida; Balashov, 1960

Prehistoric order of molluscs

Intejocerida is the name given to a group of generally straight shelled nautiloid cephalopods originally found in Lower and Middle Ordovician sediments in the Angara River basin in Russia; defined in the Treatise as an order, and combined there with the Endocerida in the Endoceratoidea.

== Diagnosis ==
Members of the Intejocerida are typically straight shelled with large siphuncles that vary in position from ventral to central, in which septal necks from very short to holochoanitic and connecting rings from moderately thick to apparently thin. Common to all, and the character by which the order was defined, are deposits within the siphuncle that have been described as longitudinal, radially arranged, calcareous lamellae.

== Taxonomy ==
=== Taxonomic relations ===
Flower (1976) pointed out that not only does the Intejocerida contain two groups, one with Intejoceras and Bajkaloceras with central siphuncles, the other with Envencoceras, Padunoceras, and a third genus Rossoceras, but that combining it with the Endocerida in the Endoceratoidea, makes the latter polyphyletic and therefore an invalid taxon.

=== Derivation ===
Intejoceras and Bajkaloceras can be reasonably derived from the Baltoceratidae or less likely from the Troedssonellidae. Evencoceras, Rossoceras, and Padunoceras have their probable origin in the Proterocameroceratidae and are retained with the endocerids.
