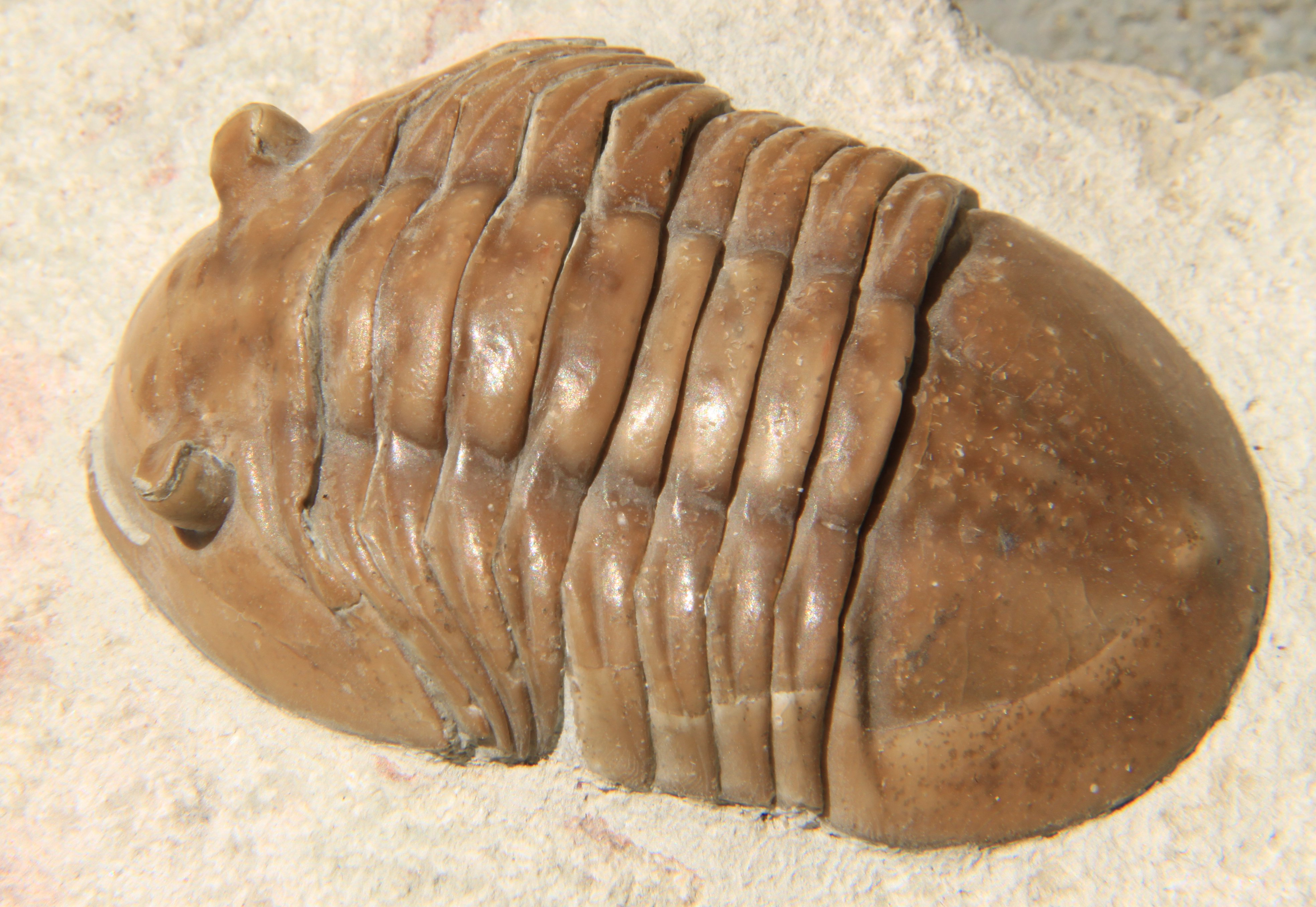
- Asaphus latus

Scientific classification
- Kingdom: Animalia
- Phylum: Arthropoda
- Clade: †Artiopoda
- Class: †Trilobita
- Order: †Asaphida
- Superfamily: †Asaphoidea
- Family: †Asaphidae; Burmeister, 1843

Genera
- See text

= Asaphidae =

Asaphidae Temporal range: Upper Cambrian–Ordovician

Extinct family of trilobites

Asaphidae is a family of asaphid trilobites. Although the first genera originate in Upper Cambrian marine strata, the family becomes the most widely distributed and most species-rich trilobite family during the Ordovician.

== Distribution ==
Most Asaphinae are characteristic of Baltica. Isotelinae genera are concentrated in Laurentia. The genera of Nobiliasaphinae are distributed in tropical Gondwana and South China. The genera of Ogygiocaridinae occur in Avalonia, Gondwana and Baltica.

Asaphids first appeared in the Upper Cambrian, and were already fairly common during this time, when 14 genera are known from Australia, North- and South-China. The last members of the family died-out at the end of the Ordovician.

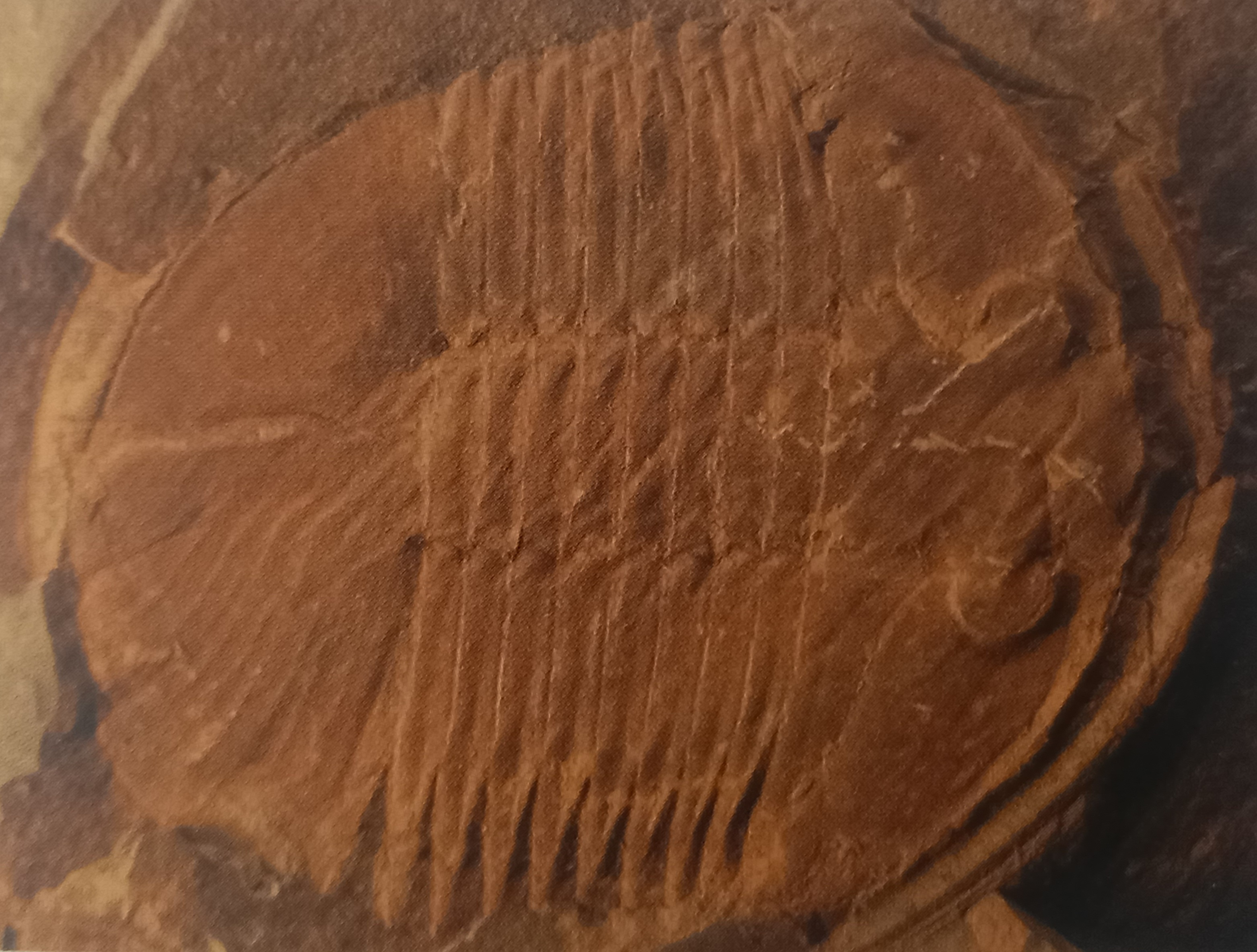
Asaphellus fossil from Mila formation, Ordovician period, Damghan, Iran

== Subdivisions and genera ==
More than 20 subfamilies have been named within the Asaphidae, but very few of the subfamily names are in regular use. Over 150 genera of asaphids have been named.

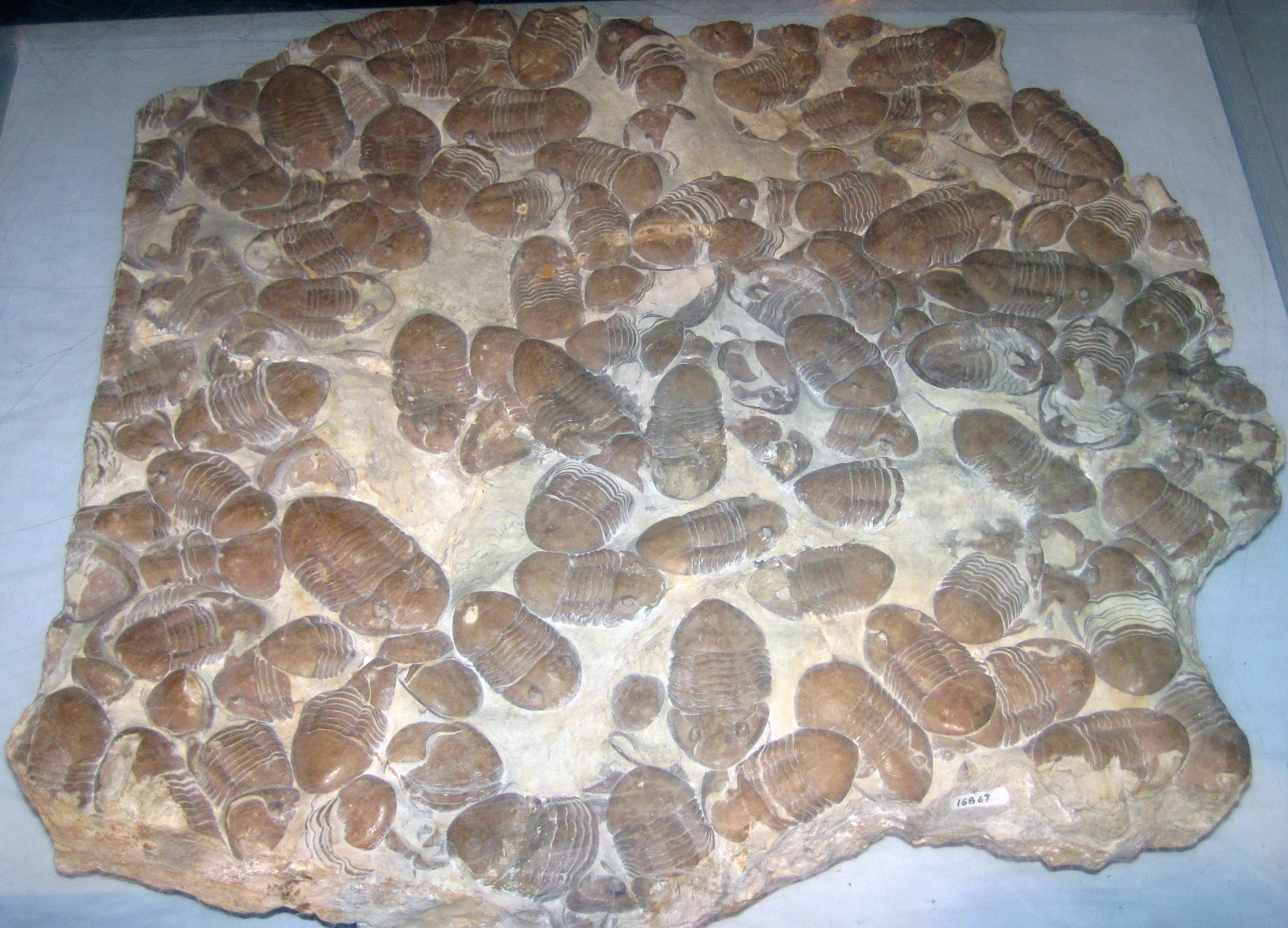
Vogdesia bromidensis

Asaphidae contains the following genera:

- Anataphrus
- Araiocaris
- Asaphellus
- Asaphus
- Atopasaphus
- Aulacoparia
- Aulacoparina
- Australopyge
- Baltiites
- Banqiaoites
- Basilicus
- Bellefontia
- Birmanitella
- Birmanites
- Bohemopyge
- Borogothus
- Brachyaspis
- Branisaspis
- Burminresia
- Charabaia
- Chengkouella
- Dubovikites
- Ectenaspis
- Emanuelaspis
- Emanuelina
- Eoasaphus
- Eoisotelus
- Erdelia
- Estoniites
- Fuyunia
- Gerasaphes
- Gog
- Gogiura
- Golasaphus
- Griphasaphus
- Guohongjunia
- Hazarania
- Heraspis
- Hoekaspis
- Homalopyge
- Hunjiangites
- Hunnebergia
- Huochengia
- Iduia
- Isabelinia
- Isotella
- Isoteloides
- Isotelus
- Isyrakella
- Isyrakopeltis
- Kainisiliellina
- Kayseraspis
- Klabavia
- Kobayashia
- Lachnostoma
- Lamanskytes
- Lapidaria
- Leningradites
- Liomegalaspides
- Lisogorites
- Liushuicephalus
- Lonchobasilicus
- Lycophron
- Megalaspidella
- Megalaspides
- Megasaphus
- Megatemnoura
- Megistaspis
- Merlinia
- Metaptychopyge
- Metayuepingia
- Mioptychopyge
- Mischynogorites
- Nahannia
- Neopeltis
- Nerudaspis
- Nileoides
- Ningkianites
- Niobe
- Niobella
- Niobides
- Niobina
- Nobiliasaphus
- Norasaphites
- Norasaphus
- Norinia
- Notopeltis
- Ogmasaphus
- Ogyginus
- Ogygiocarella
- Ogygiocaris
- Ogygitella
- Ogygites
- Ogygitoides
- Onchometopus
- Parabellefontia
- Paramegalaspis
- Paraptychopyge
- Paratamdaspis
- Parayuepingia
- Penchiopsis
- Platyptychopyge
- Plectasaphus
- Plesiyuepingia
- Popovkiaspis
- Popovkites
- Praecoparia
- Presbynileus
- Priceaspis
- Proasaphus
- Promegalaspides
- Protopresbynileus
- Protoptychopyge
- Proxiniobe
- Pseudoasaphinus
- Pseudoasaphoides
- Pseudoasaphus
- Pseudobasilicoides
- Pseudobasilicus
- Pseudobasiliella
- Pseudobasiloides
- Pseudogriphasaphus
- Pseudogygites
- Pseudomegalaspis
- Pseudoptychopyge
- Pseudoptyocephalus
- Psilocephalina
- Psilocephalops
- Ptychopyge
- Ptyocephalus
- Sanbernardaspis
- Shergoldina
- Stegnopsis
- Stenorhachis
- Suriaspis
- Tchukeraspis
- Thysanopyge
- Trigonocerca
- Trigonocercella
- Tsaidamaspis
- Valdaites
- Vogdesia
- Volchovites
- Xenasaphus
- Xenostegium
- Xinanocephalus
- Yuepingioides
- Zhenganites
- Zoraspis
- Zuninaspis

== Links ==
- "Drawings of many asaphids". Problems of evolution. Archived from the original on January 3, 2014.
