= Clitendoceras =

Clitendoceras Temporal range: LOrdovician(mid-late Canad)

Scientific classification
- Domain: Eukaryota
- Kingdom: Animalia
- Phylum: Mollusca
- Class: Cephalopoda
- Subclass: Nautiloidea
- Order: †Endocerida
- Family: †Proterocameroceratidae
- Genus: †Clitendoceras; Ulrich and Foeste, 1936

Genus of molluscs

Clitendoceras is a genus of cephalopods in the order Endocerida from the Lower Ordovician (m-u Canadian) with an elongate shell with a slight downward, endogastric, curvature and a siphuncle that lies along the ventral margin. Common for endocerids, the chambers are short and the septa close spaced with sutures sloping forward across the back of the shell. Septal necks are short in the young, lengthening in the adult. Endocones are simple, but with the ventral side of the last formed projecting forward. The endosiphotube running down the middle is arched on top and somewhat flat on the lower side.

Clitendoceras appears early in the Domingian stage, Lower Ordovician, probably derived from Proendoceras, and is the likely ancestor of the mostly compressed and breviconic pilocerids as well as of more similar forms such as Mcqueenoceras.
