= Llandeilo Group =

Middle subdivision of the British Ordovician rocks

In geology, the Llandeilo Group is the middle subdivision of the British Ordovician rocks. It was first described and named by Sir Roderick Murchison from the neighborhood of Llandeilo in Carmarthenshire. In the type area it consists of a series of slaty rocks, shales, calcareous flagstones and sandstones; the calcareous middle portion is sometimes termed the Llandeilo limestone; and in the upper portion volcanic rocks are intercalated.

== Features ==
A remarkable feature in the history of the Llandeilo rocks in Britain, more especially in North Wales and Cumberland, was the outbreak of volcanic action; vast piles of Llandeilo lava and ashes form such hills as Cadair Idris, and the Arenigs in Wales, and Helvellyn and Scafell in Westmorland and Cumberland. The series is also found at Builth and in Pembrokeshire. The average thickness in Wales is about 2000 ft. The group is usually divided in this area into three sub-divisions. In the Corndon district of Shropshire the Middleton Series represents the Llandeilo group; it includes, in descending order, the Rorrington black shales, the Meadowtown limestones and flags, and the western grits and shales. In the Lake District the great volcanic series of Borrowdale, green slates and porphyries, 8000 to ooooft. in thickness, lies on this horizon; and in the Cross Fell area the Milburn beds of the Skiddaw slates (see Arenig) appear to be of the same age. In Scotland the Llandeilo group is represented by the Glenkiln shales, black shales and yellowish mudstones with radiolarian cherts and volcanic tuffs; by the Barr Series, including the Benan conglomerates, Stinchar limestone and Kirkland sandstones; and by the Glenapp conglomerates and Tappinsrnudstones and grits south of Stinchar. Graptolitic shales, similar to those of southern Scotland, are traceable into the north-east of Ireland.

== Fossils ==
The fossils of the Liandeilo group include numerous graptolites, Coenograpus gracilis being taken as the zonal fossil of the upper portion, Didymograptus murchisoni of the lower. Other forms are Climacograptus scharenbergi and Diplograptus foliaceus. Many trilobites are found in these rocks, e.g. Ogygiocarella debuchii, Asaphus tyrannus, Calymene cambrensis, and Cheirurus. Among the brachiopods are Crania, Leptaena, Lingula, and Strophomena. Cardiola and Modiolopsis occur among the pelecypods; Euomphalus, Bellerophon, Murchisonia among the gastropods; and Conularia and Hyolithes among the pteropods. The cephalopods are represented by Orthoceras and Cyrtoceras.

== Quarrying ==
The green roofing slates and plumbago (graphite) of the Lake District are obtained from this group of rocks.
