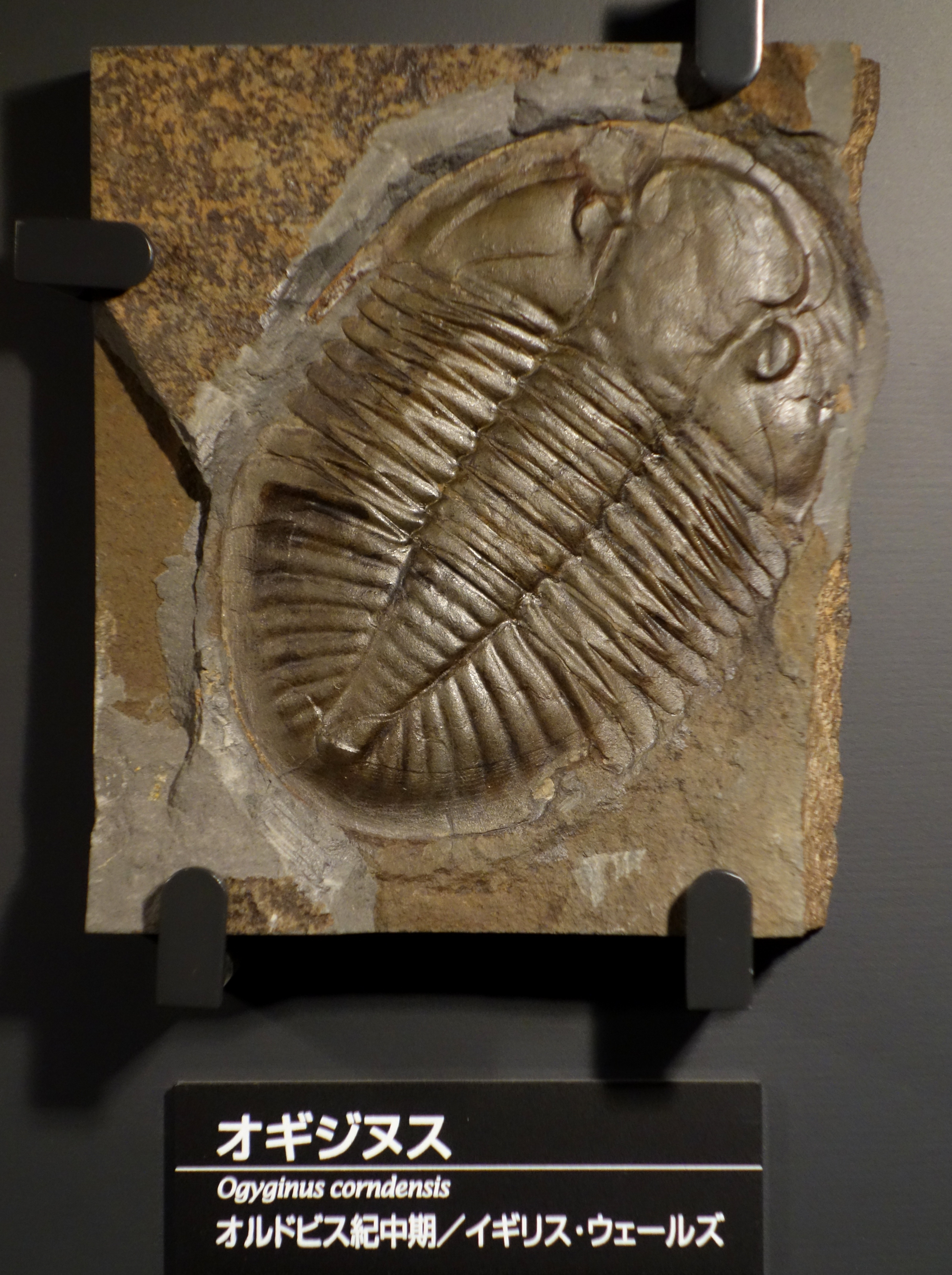
- Ogyginus corndensis

Scientific classification
- Kingdom: Animalia
- Phylum: Arthropoda
- Clade: †Artiopoda
- Class: †Trilobita
- Order: †Asaphida
- Family: †Asaphidae
- Genus: †Ogyginus; Raymond, 1912

Species
- O. corndensis

= Ogyginus =

Ogyginus Temporal range: Ordovician

Extinct genus of trilobites

Ogyginus is an extinct genus of asaphid trilobites that lived during the Ordovician period. Commonly found in Wales. The type specimen was first described by Murchison in 1839 as Asaphus corndensis, though the species was later reassigned.
