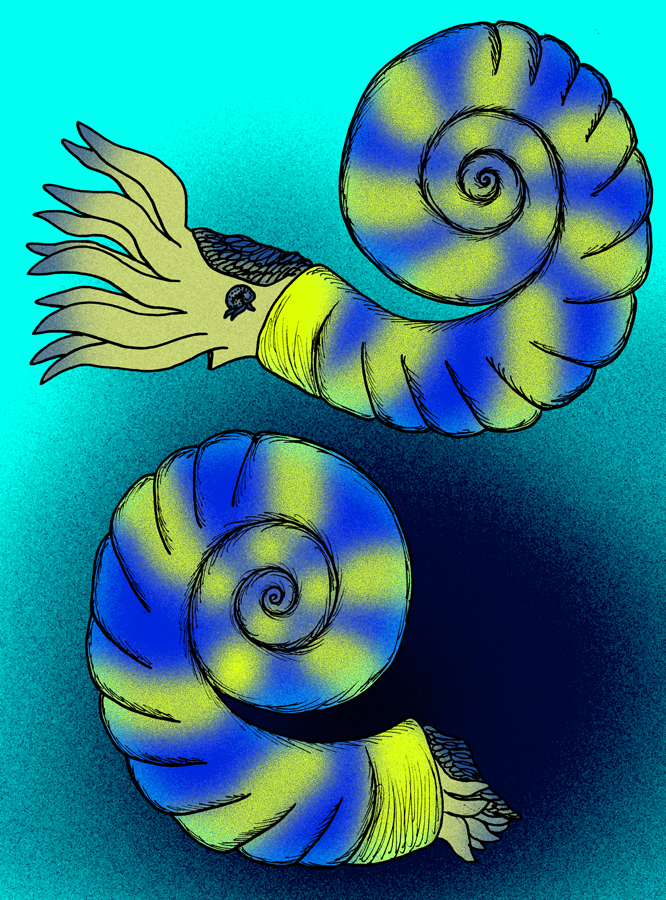
- Artist's restoration of A. sewardi

Scientific classification
- Kingdom: Animalia
- Phylum: Mollusca
- Class: Cephalopoda
- Subclass: Nautiloidea
- Order: †Tarphycerida
- Family: †Estonioceratidae
- Genus: †Alaskoceras; Miller & Kummel, 1945

= Alaskoceras =

Alaskoceras Temporal range: Early/lower Ordovician

Extinct genus of molluscs

Alaskoceras is a genus of lower Ordovician coiled nautiloid cephalopods; the shell moderately expanded, ribbed, with a divergent living chamber; whorl section more broadly rounded ventrally than dorsally; siphuncle marginal at maturity, septal necks short, almost achoanitic; connecting rings thick, layered.

Alaskcoceras belongs to the Tarphycerida, and to the family Estonioceratidae. It was found in Alaska.
