= Mcqueenoceras =

Mcqueenoceras Temporal range: Floian

Scientific classification
- Kingdom: Animalia
- Phylum: Mollusca
- Class: Cephalopoda
- Subclass: Nautiloidea
- Order: †Endocerida
- Family: †Proterocameroceratidae
- Genus: †Mcqueenoceras; Ulrich & Foerste, 1935

Type species
- Mcqueenoceras jeffersonense Ulrich & Foerste, 1935

Other species
- Mcqueenoceras cariniferum Flower, 1956; Mcqueenoceras ventrale Flower, 1956

Extinct genus of nautiloids

Mcqueenoceras is an extinct genus of early endocerid, a nautiloid from the Floian epoch of the late early Ordovician period. It was similar in overall form to Clitendoceras, from which it may have been derived. Mcqueenoceras, like Clitendoceras, has ventral siphuncle but the endocones are thicker on the ventral side and thinner on the dorsal. Also the sutures in Mcqueenoceras retreat rearward, forming lobes as they cross the venter. The type species is Mcqueenoceras jeffersonense, named by E.O. Ulrich and A.F. Foerste in 1935, and it is known from Missouri and New York. In 1956, Rousseau H. Flower named two other species, M. cariniferum and M. ventrale, both known from Maryland.
