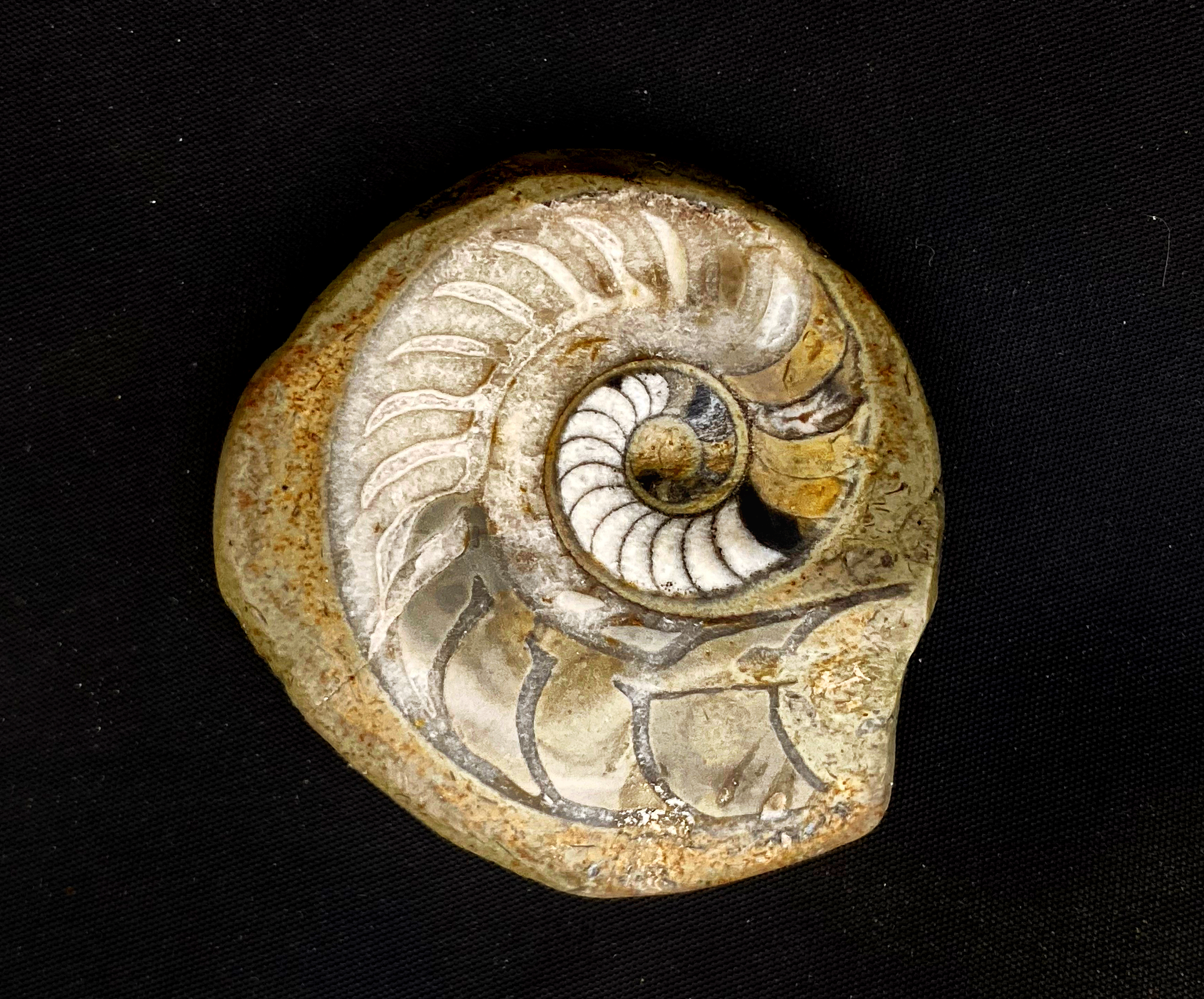
- Estonioceras, found in the uppermost layer in Stora stenbrottet at Mt. Kinnekulle, Sweden

Scientific classification
- Kingdom: Animalia
- Phylum: Mollusca
- Class: Cephalopoda
- Subclass: Nautiloidea
- Order: †Tarphycerida
- Family: †Estonioceratidae
- Genus: †Estonioceras; Noetling, 1883

Species
- Estonioceras imperfectum (Quenstedt, 1845)

= Estonioceras =

Estonioceras Temporal range: Ordovician

Extinct genus of nautiloid molluscs

Estonioceras, named after the country Estonia and Ancient Greek: κέρας, romanized: kéras, lit. 'horn', is an extinct genus of tarphyceridan nautiloids from the Ordovician of Europe.

== Sources ==
- Dinosaur Encyclopedia by Jayne Parsons
- Fossils (Smithsonian Handbooks) by David Ward
