= Billingsellida =

Scientific classification
- Kingdom: Animalia
- Phylum: Brachiopoda
- Class: †Strophomenata
- Order: †Billingsellida

Order of marine lamp shells

Billingsellida is an order of brachiopods containing the families:

- Suborder Billingsellidina
  - Superfamily Billingselloidea
    - Family Billingsellidae
- Suborder Clitambonitidina
  - Superfamily Clitambonitoidea
    - Family Clitambonitidae
    - Family Gonambonitidae
  - Superfamily Polytoechioidea
    - Family Polytoechiidae
