= Whiterock Stage =

The Whiterockian, often referred to simply as the Whiterock, is an earliest or lowermost stage of the Middle Ordovician. Although the Whiterockian or Whiterock Stage refers mainly to the early Middle Ordovician in North America, it is often used in the older literature in a global sense.

The Whitetrock Stage was introduced by Cooper and Cooper (in Cooper, 1956, p. 6–7) "as a post-Canadian – pre-Chazyan chrono-stratographic unit" based on strata "in the Monitor and Antelope Ranges, flanking Antelope Valley, and in the Toquima Range of central Nevada", referred to as the Antelope Valley Limestone. The strato-type section in Whiterock Canyon in the northern Monitor Range and reference section at Meiklejohn Peak, Bare Mountain Quad. Nev. both show the boundary between the middle Ordovician Whiterock and underlying (mostly Canadian) Ibex series lies between the conodont Oepikodus evae, below, and Tripodus laevis, above, at the start of the Isograptus victoriae graptolite lineage, seemingly coincident with the start of the Taconic Orogeny.

The Whiterock Stage is given a range from 471.8 (ca. 472) to 462 m.y.a., spanning close to 10 million years. Officially its start is defined by the potentially lowest occurrence of the conodont Protoprioniodus aranda or Baltoniodus triangularis. The Whiterockian is preceded by the North American Cassinian and Ibexian stages and by the Canadian Series and ICS Arenigian, overlaps with the slightly younger and newer ICS Darriwilian and is followed as originally conceived by the Chazyan of North America.
