= Canadian Epoch =

Lower or Early Ordovician in North America

The Canadian Epoch is the Lower or Early Ordovician in North America. The term is common in the older literature and has been well understood for more than a century. However it has no official recognition by the International Commission on Stratigraphy (ICS) and has been superseded by the more recently defined Ibexian series of western Utah.

== Background ==
Dana introduced the Canadian as the name for a system separated from the rest of the Ordovician (Weller 1980), then known as the Lower Silurian, and referred to the rest of the Lower Silurian as the Trenton System. At that time the Ordovician had not yet been recognized. Later Ulrich redefined the Canadian as roughly equivalent to the Beekmantown strata of the Lower Ordovician.

Flower (1957 p. 17) felt that recognition of the Canadian as a separate system would greatly solve problems in Early Paleozoic stratigraphy. As such, faunas in limestones of Canadian age are uniformly widespread and set off sharply from black shale graptolite facies (Flower 1957) whereas those in the remaining Ordovician are more local in nature and the two facies are more integrated.

In common practice (e.g. MLK 1952, Weller 1960) the Canadian has been viewed as the Early, or Lower Ordovician. Flower however (1957, 1964) separated the Canadian from the rest of the Ordovician and defined it as a four-part system, divided in ascending order into the Gasconadian, Demingian, Jeffersonian, and Cassinian which stands today. The remaining Ordovician was also divided (Flower 1964, fig 3 p. 23) into four parts, the Whiterockian, Chazyan, Mohawkian, and Cincinnatian.

== Divisions, Stages ==
Starting at the bottom:

- The Gasconadian, named for the Gasconade Formation in the Ozarks in Missouri is the Lower Canadian. The base of the Gasconade is a dolomitic sand, the Gunter Sandstone which is deposited on an erosional surface on the underlying Cambrian. The North American Gasconadian and the Tremedocian of the standard section are equivalent.
- The Demingian, named for the town of Deming in southern New Mexico which lies near localities where outcrops of this age are found is Middle Canadian and roughly equivalent to the Lower Arenigian.
- The Jeffersonian which is the Lower Upper Canadian is based on the dolomitic Jefferson City Formation of Missouri, roughly the Middle Arenigian
- The Cassinian, named for the Fort Cassin limestone of western Vermont, named for Fort Cassin which stood on the shore of Lake Champlain, is Upper Upper Canadian, equivalent in part to the Upper Arenigian.

== The El Paso Group ==
All four stages of the Canadian, except for the uppermost Cassinian, are represented in the El Paso Group in New Mexico and West Texas. The name comes from the City of El Paso, Texas, which is next to the Franklin Mountains were the type section is found.

== Ibexian Correlation ==
The Ibexian and Canadian correlate imprecisely. Their upper boundaries are equivalent, found at the base of the Whiterock stage and the base of the Middle Ordovician. The Ibexian however extends below the Ordovician into the Upper Cambrian as each is defined. On the other hand, the Canadian and Lower (Early) Ordovician are entirely equivalent.
