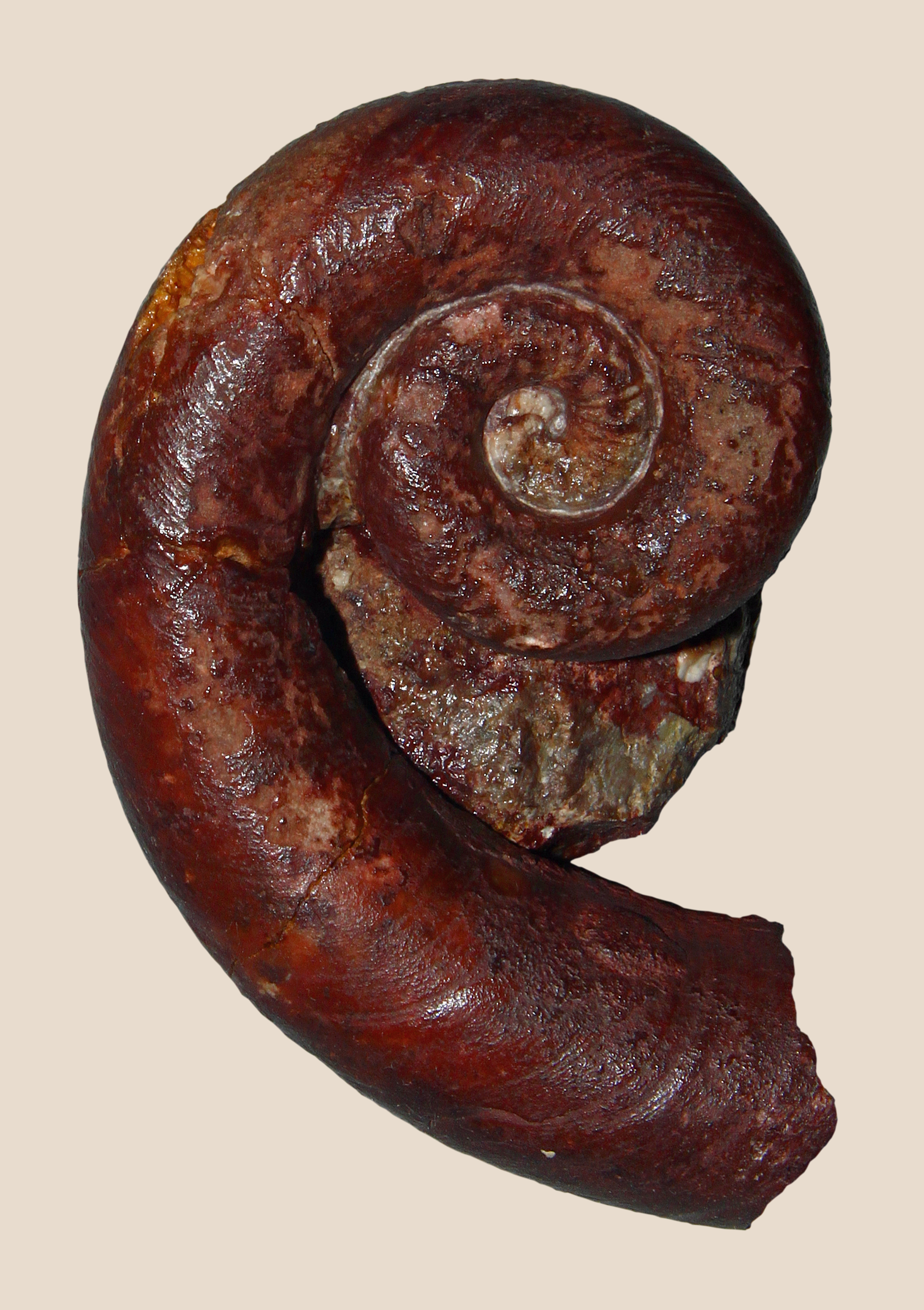
- Estonioceras ariense

Scientific classification
- Domain: Eukaryota
- Kingdom: Animalia
- Phylum: Mollusca
- Class: Cephalopoda
- Subclass: Nautiloidea
- Order: †Tarphycerida
- Family: †Estonioceratidae; Hyatt in Zittel, 1900

= Estonioceratidae =

Estonioceratidae Temporal range: L Ordovician

Extinct family of nautiloids

The Estonioceratidae, from Estonia and Ancient Greek κέρας (kéras), meaning "horn", are a family of loosely coiled tarphycerids in which the inner side of the whorls, which forms the dorsum, is rounded or flat with no impression, and in which the siphuncle, composed of thick tubular segments, is located ventrally. The Estonioceratidae seem to form a link between the ancestral Bassleroceratidae and the more tightly coiled Tarphyceratidae.
