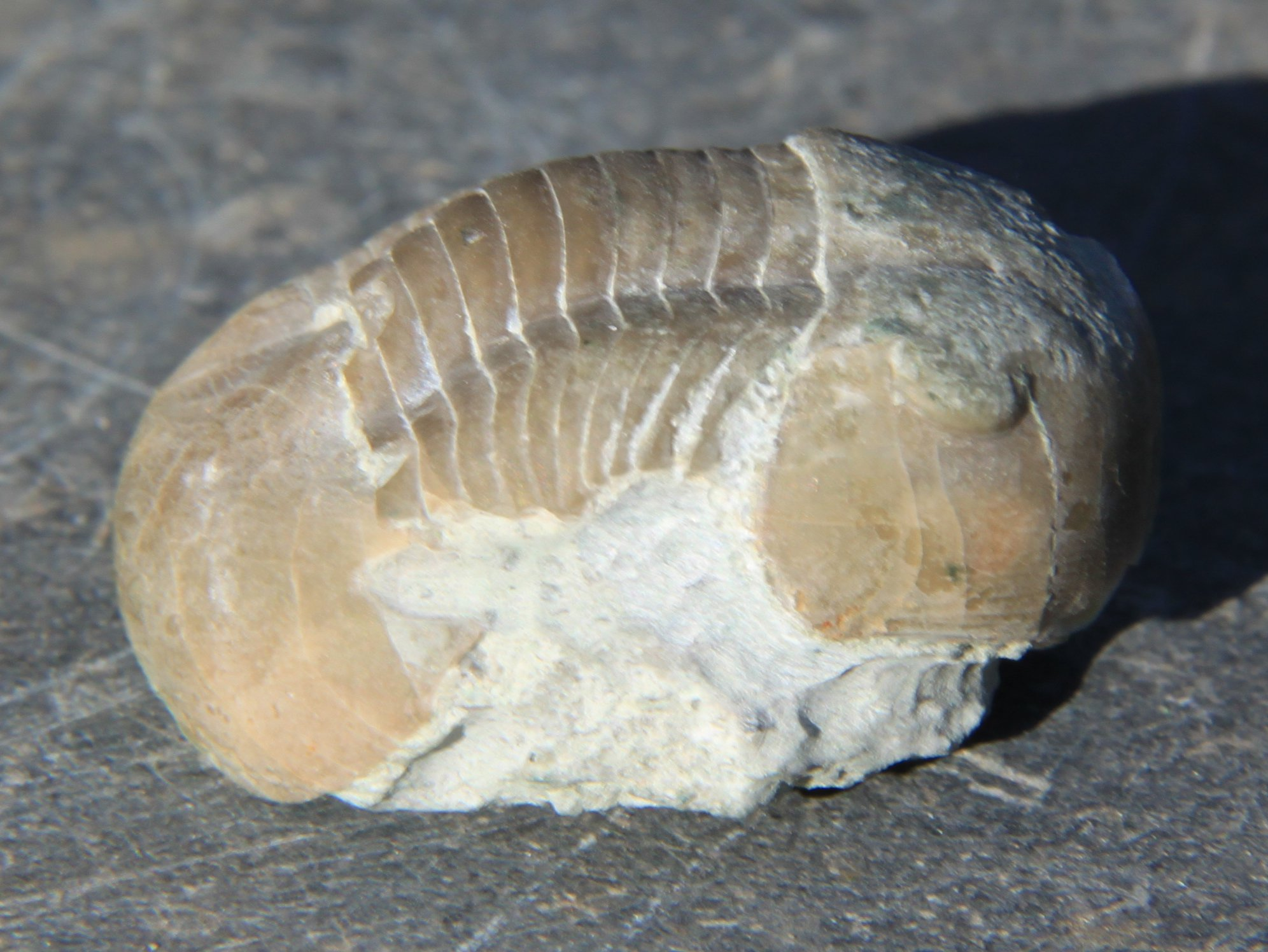
- Illaenus sarsi, 25mm

Scientific classification
- Domain: Eukaryota
- Kingdom: Animalia
- Phylum: Arthropoda
- Class: †Trilobita
- Order: †Corynexochida
- Suborder: †Illaenina; Jaanusson, 1959

Families
- Illaenidae; Panderiidae; Phillipsinellidae; Styginidae

= Illaenina =

Illaenina Temporal range: Cambrian-Devonian

Extinct suborder of trilobites

The Illaenina are a suborder of trilobites in the order Corynexochida.

== Taxonomy ==
- Illaenidae

Alloillaenus, Bumastoides, Dysplanus, Ectillaenus, Harpillaenus, Hyboaspis, Illaenus, Nanillaenus, Ninglangia, Octillaenus, Ordosaspis, Parillaenus, Platillaenus, Ptilillaenus, Quadratillaenus, Snajdria, Spinillaenus, Stenopareia, Trigoncekovia, Ulugtella, Vysocania, Wuchuanella, Zbirovia, Zdicella, Zetillaenus.

- Panderiidae

Hemibarrandia, Ottenbyaspis, Panderia, Pogrebovites.

- Styginidae

Alceste, Altaepeltis, Amphoriops, Ancyropyge, Andegavia, Arctipeltis, Australoscutellum, Avascutellum, Bojoscutellum, Boreoscutellum, Breviscutellum, Bronteopsis, Brontocephalina, Brontocephalus, Bubupeltina, Bumastella, Bumastus, Calycoscutellum, Cavetia, Cekovia, Chichikaspis, Chugaevia, Ciliscutellum, Cornuscutellum, Craigheadia, Cybantyx, Decoroscutellum, Delgadoa, Dentaloscutellum, Dulanaspis, Ekwanoscutellum, Eobronteus, Eokosovopeltis, Eoscutellum, Exastipyx, Excetra, Failleana, Flexiscutellum, Goldillaenoides, Goldillaenus, Hallanta, Hidascutellum, Illaenoides, Illaenoscutellum, Izarnia, Japonoscutellum, Kirkdomina, Kobayashipeltis, Kolihapeltis, Kosovopeltis, Kotysopeltis, Lamproscutellum, Leioscutellum, Ligiscus, Liolalax, Litotix, Meitanillaenus, Meridioscutellum, Meroperix, Metascutellum, Microscutellum, Mulciberaspis, Neoscutellum, Octobronteus, Opoa, Ottoaspis, Paracybantyx, Paralejurus, Paraphillipsinella, Perischoclonus, Phillipsinella, Planiscutellum, Platyscutellum, Poroscutellum, Protobronteus, Protostygina, Pseudoeobronteus, Pseudostygina, Quyuania, Radioscutellum, Raymondaspis, Rhaxeros, Sangzhiscutellum, Scabriscutellum, Scutellum, Septimopeltis, Spiniscutellum, Stygina, Styginella, Tenuipeltis, Thaleops, Theamataspis, Thomastus, Thysanopeltella, Thysanopeltis, Tosacephalus, Turgicephalus, Unicapeltis, Uraloscutellum, Waisfeldaspis, Weberopeltis, Xyoeax.

- Tsinaniidae

Blandiaspis, Dictyella, Esseigania, Guluheia, Jiwangshania, Leiaspis, Lonchopygella, Paradictyites, Shergoldia, Taipaikia, Tsinania, Zhujia.
