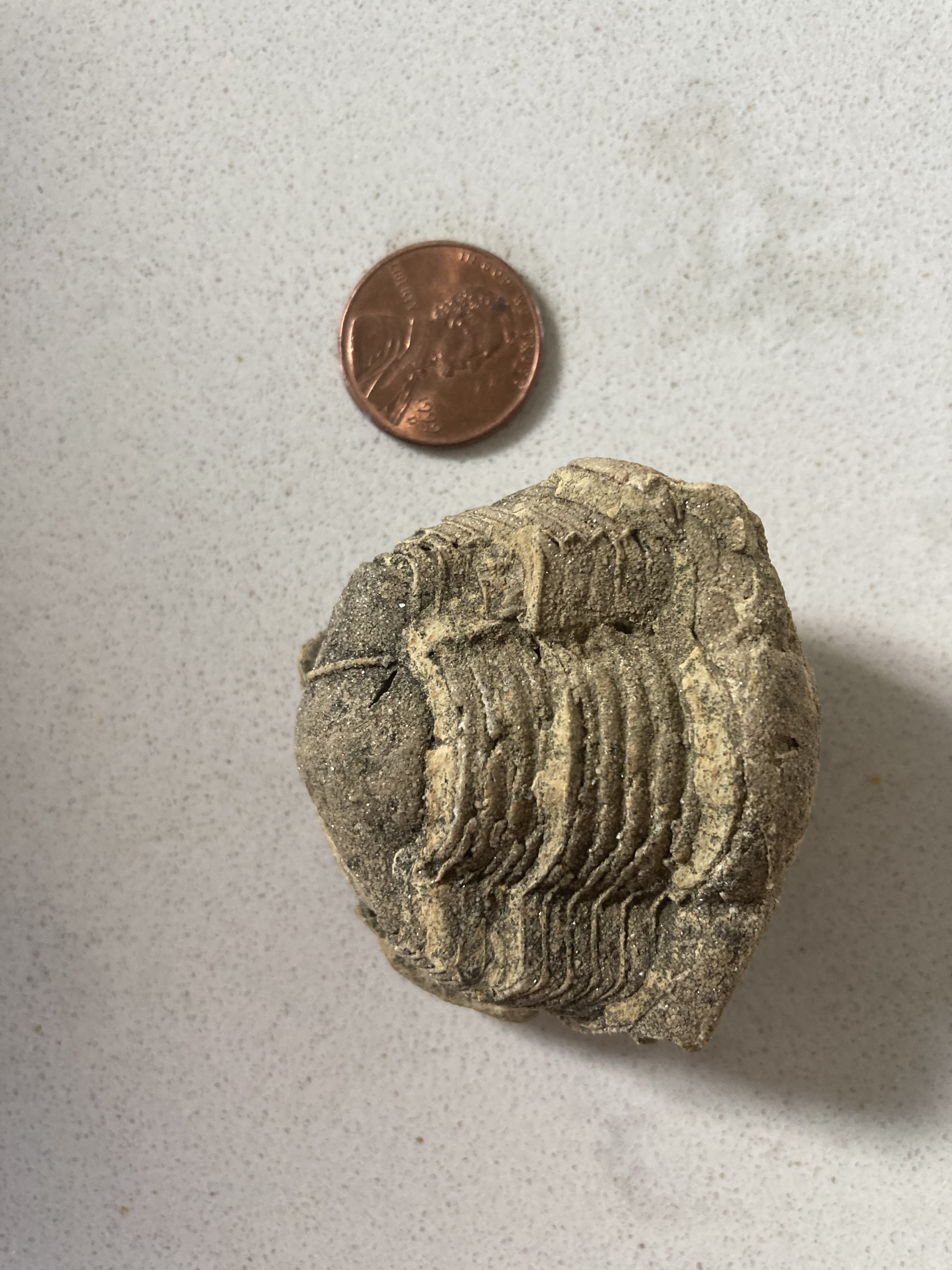
- A Thaleops sp. from Mount Horeb, Wisconsin
- A line drawing of the species T. ovata

Scientific classification
- Domain: Eukaryota
- Kingdom: Animalia
- Phylum: Arthropoda
- Class: †Trilobita
- Order: †Corynexochida
- Family: †Illaenidae
- Genus: †Thaleops; Conrad, 1843

Type species
- †Thaleops ovata Conrad, 1843

Species
- †T. ovata Conrad, 1843; †T. arctura Hall, 1847; †T. angusticollis Billings, 1859; †T. clavifrons Billings, 1859; †T. conifrons Billings, 1859; †T. conradi Billings, 1859; †T. vindex Billings, 1865; †T. punctata Raymond, 1905; †T. latiaxiata Raymond & Narraway, 1908; †T. fieldi Raymond, 1925; †T. marginalis Raymond, 1925; †T. viator Raymond, 1925; †T. groenlandica Troedsson, 1928; †T. depressicapitata Bradley, 1930; †T. borealis Teichert, 1937; †T. baffinlandica Roy, 1941; †T. lacerta Whittington, 1954; †T. longispina Shaw, 1968; †T. raymondi Shaw, 1968; †T. inflata Shaw, 1968; †T. adunca Chatterton & Ludvigsen, 1976; †T. mackenziensis Chatterton & Ludvigsen, 1976; †T. nunavutica Hammann, 1992; †T. zoppii Hammann & Leone, 1997; †T. anusacerbissima Amati & Westrop, 2004; †T. jaanussoni Amati & Westrop, 2004; †T. mobydicki Amati & Westrop, 2004; †T. laurentiana Amati & Westrop, 2004

Synonyms
- †Nanillaenus? Jaanusson, 1954

= Thaleops =

Thaleops Temporal range: Middle Ordovician–Katian

Extinct Trilobite arthropod from the Ordovician

Thaleops is an extinct genus of trilobite of the family Illaenidae. It lived from the Floian to the Katian of the Ordovician in what is now North America. Thaleops can be told apart from other illaenids because of the cheek spines that many species possess under their eyes. Thaleops had a large distribution range, With some species being found in parts of Canada to some U.S states including Oklahoma, Wisconsin, and New York. It is thought to have lived in shallow water, as a study published in Oklahoma found that deposits that contained Thaleops and the asaphid trilobite Bumastides contained 4 times as many trilobite genera, where associated with shallow water areas.

== Classification ==
Classification of Thaleops, Illaenus, and Nanillaenus by Amati & Westrop, 2004.

- Raymondaspis
- - I. roemeri
  - - - I. fallax
      - I. praecurrens
    - - I. crassicauda
      - I. sarsi
      - I. aduncus
      - I. planifrons
      - I. oscitatus
      - Thaleops
        - I. marginalis
        - - I. utahensis
          - - - I. lacertus
              - I. viator
            - - T. mobydicki
              - - - - I. conradi
                    - T. laurentiana
                  - - Nanillaenus mackenziensis
                    - - Nanillaenus aduncus
                      - T. anusacerbissima
                - - I. fieldi
                  - - I. latiaxiatus
                    - I. depressicapitatus
                    - - T. jaanussoni
                      - - T. raymondi
                        - - I. angusticollis
                          - T. ovata
                          - - I. conifrons
                            - T. longispina

Thaleops
