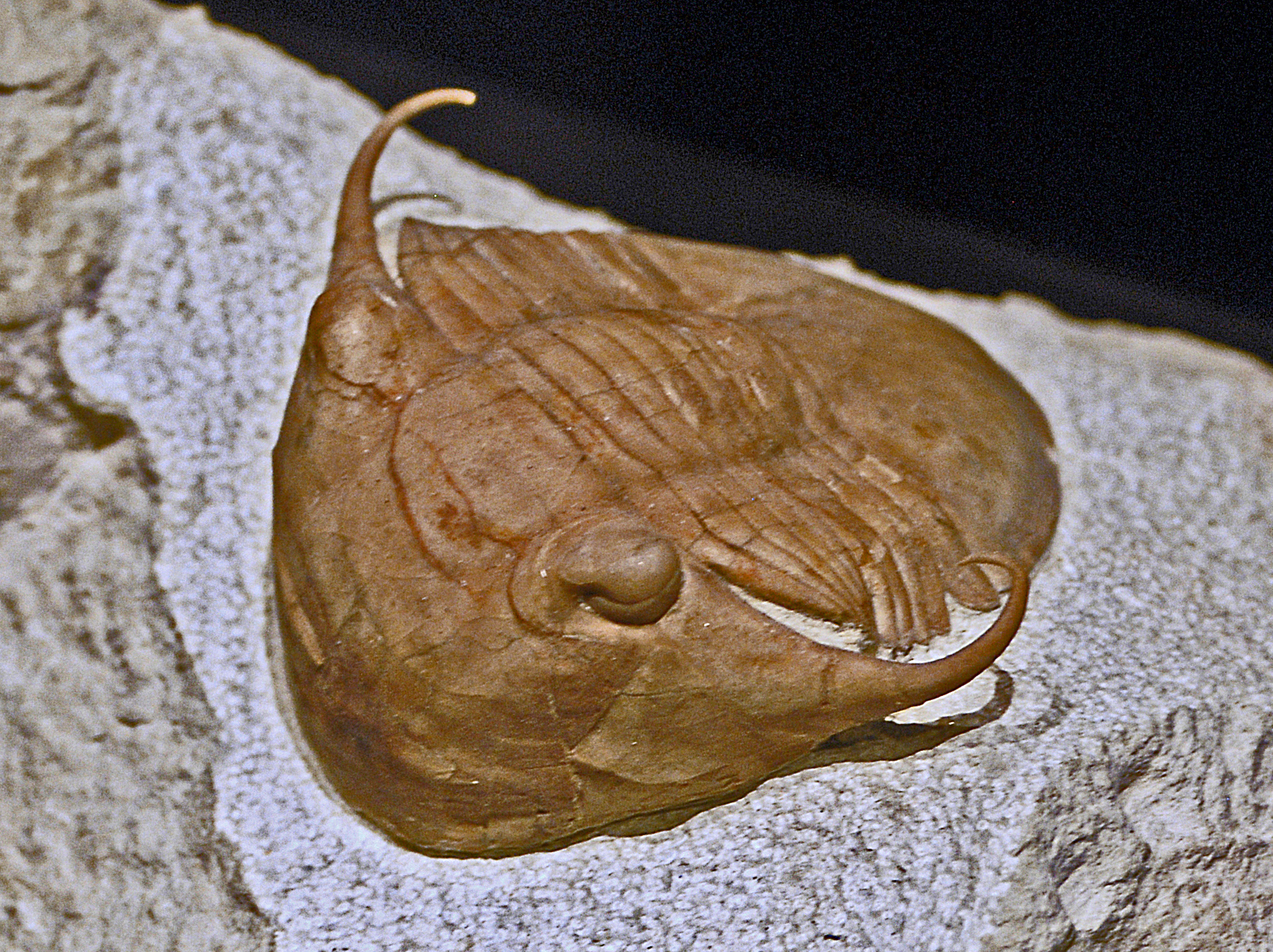
- Illaenus tauricornis from Russia. On display at the Museo Civico di Storia Naturale di Milano

Scientific classification
- Domain: Eukaryota
- Kingdom: Animalia
- Phylum: Arthropoda
- Class: †Trilobita
- Order: †Corynexochida
- Family: †Illaenidae
- Genus: †Illaenus
- Species: †I. tauricornis

Binomial name
- †Illaenus tauricornis (Kutorga 1848)

= Illaenus tauricornis =

Illaenus tauricornis Temporal range: Middle Ordovician

Species of trilobite

Illaenus tauricornis is a species of trilobites from Russia and Morocco, from the middle Ordovician.

== Etymology ==
The Latin species name tauricornis means "bull-horned", with reference to the shape of the genal spines.

== Description ==
Illaenus tauricornis can reach a length of about 57 millimetres (2.2 in). These trilobites are without glabella and without articulation of the tail. The cephalon has a high profile and recurved genal spines. Eyes are distant from the axis of the head, situated nearer to the edge. Usually the cephalon is contracted, due to the contraction of the muscles during the fossilization.
