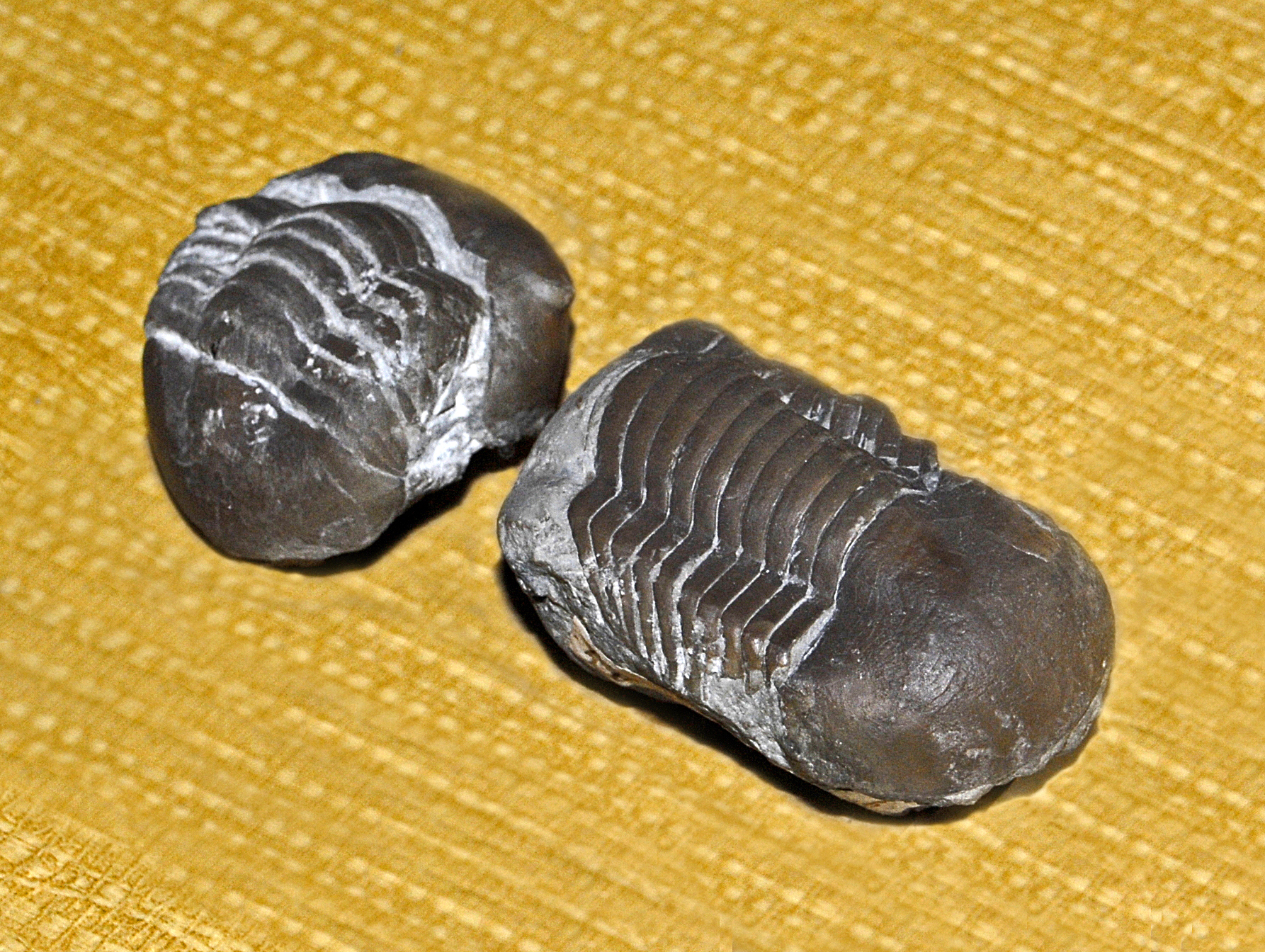
- Fossil of Illaenus crassicauda from Sweden, on display at Galerie de paléontologie et d'anatomie comparée in Paris

Scientific classification
- Domain: Eukaryota
- Kingdom: Animalia
- Phylum: Arthropoda
- Class: †Trilobita
- Order: †Corynexochida
- Family: †Illaenidae
- Genus: †Illaenus
- Species: †I. crassicauda

Binomial name
- †Illaenus crassicauda Wahlenberg 1826

= Illaenus crassicauda =

Illaenus crassicauda Temporal range: Middle Ordovician

Species of trilobites belonging to the family Illaenidae

Illaenus crassicauda is a species of trilobites belonging to the family Illaenidae. These trilobites lived in the middle Ordovician and in the Silurian age (443 - 418 million years ago). Fossils of this species have been found in the sediments of Sweden and Russia.

== Etymology ==
The Latin species name crassicauda means "fat-tailed", with reference to the shape of the pygidium.

== Description ==
Illaenus crassicauda can reach a length of about 14 centimetres (5.5 in). These trilobites are without glabella and without articulation of the tail. The cephalon has a high profile. The large bulbous head are distant from the axis of the head, close to the margin.
