= Moulin de Macaire =

Watermill in Brittany, France

The Moulin de Macaire is a historic watermill on the River Vilaine in the commune of Pléchâtel, Ille-et-Vilaine, Brittany, France.

== History ==
The two primary mills of Macaire have origins dating back to March 10, 1418, and July 26, 1542, respectively. An authentic document testifies to the reconstruction of these mills in 1645. On August 13, 1828, a royal decree authorized the transformation of the mill into a flour mill. On August 17, 1835, Pierre Richard de La Pervanchère, owner of the mill and all of Plessis-Bardoult, decided to demolish the old Macaire mills, moving them to the left bank where they still exist today, due to their negative impact on the reconstruction of the lock and spillway.

Initially, these old mills had the shape of a spur upstream. A royal order of September 7, 1840 regulates and authorizes the reconstruction of the mills on the site of an old fulling mill, at the end of the new dam to be built. This reconstruction was completed in 1841. In 1844, the mills were put out of work due to navigation works on the Vilaine.

In 1852, the flour mill had four pairs of millstones, increasing to twelve roller mills in 1898. In 1899, a Sagebien type water wheel was mentioned. In 1862, the Macaire flour mill employed ten people.

In 1877, a metal footbridge linking the flour mill to the Macaire lock was erected, overlooking the spillway for 40 meters. This footbridge replaces the passing boat upstream of the dam, removed by prefectural decree of March 11, 1875. On June 2, 1888, Fidèle Simon, owner of the flour mill, was ordered to remove the footbridge, responsible for an accident which occurred on December 31, 1879, causing damage to the Macaire dam.

In 1913, the flour mill combined hydraulic power and steam, still retaining a hydraulic turbine in place. The mill reaches a daily output of 200 quintals.

In 1932, the mill went bankrupt. Pursued by creditors, for a debt of 5 million francs, the owner is placed under arrest warrant.

== Location ==
The mill stands on the right bank of the River Vilaine, approximately 2 km south of Pléchâtel town center.

47°51′59″N 1°46′35″W

== Gallery ==
=== Moulin de Macaire ===
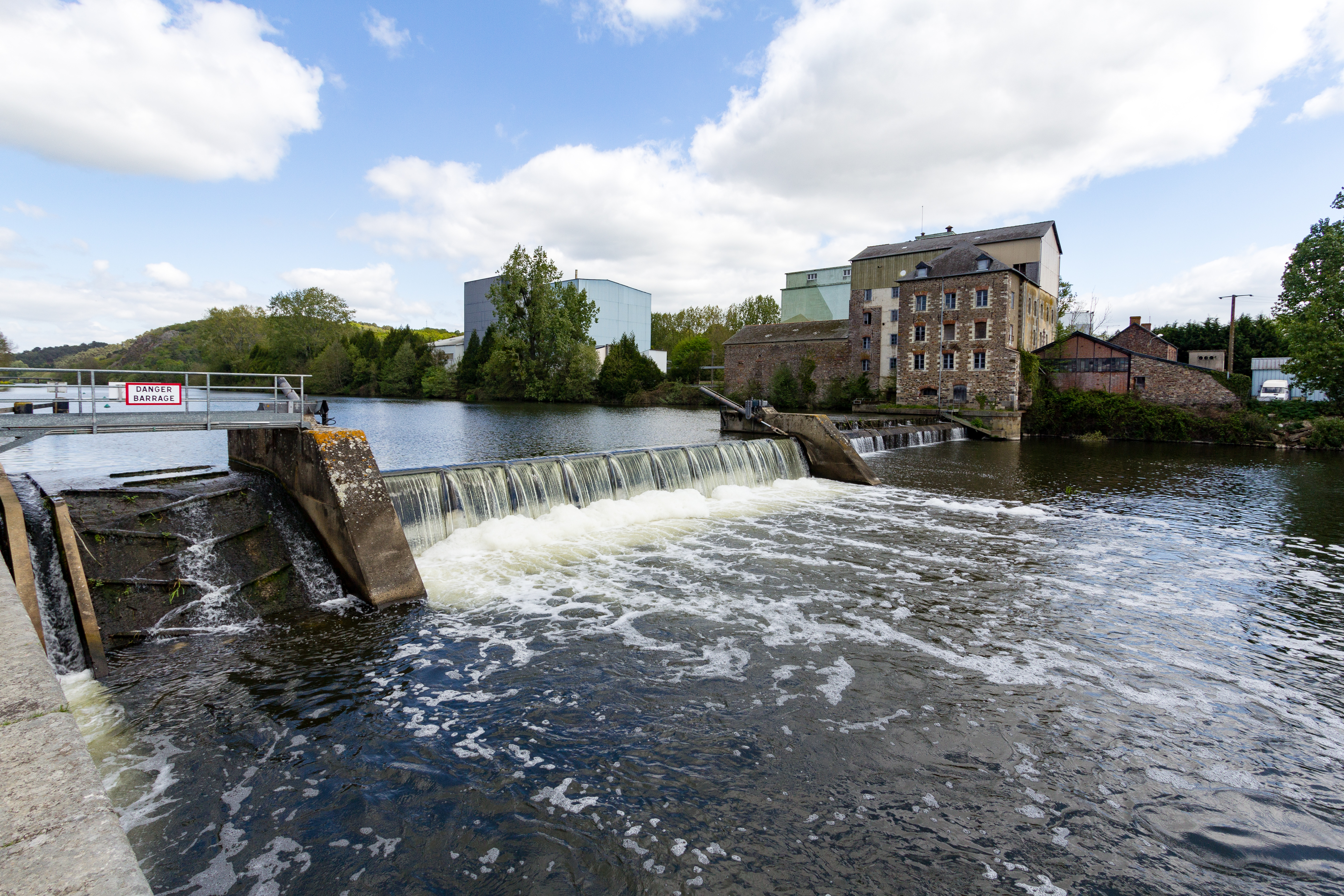

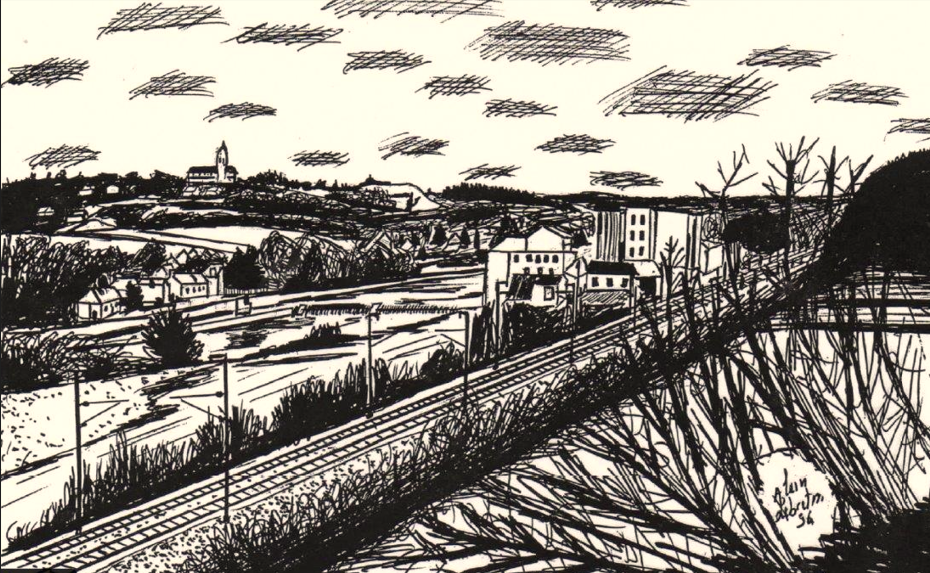

=== Lock of Macaire ===
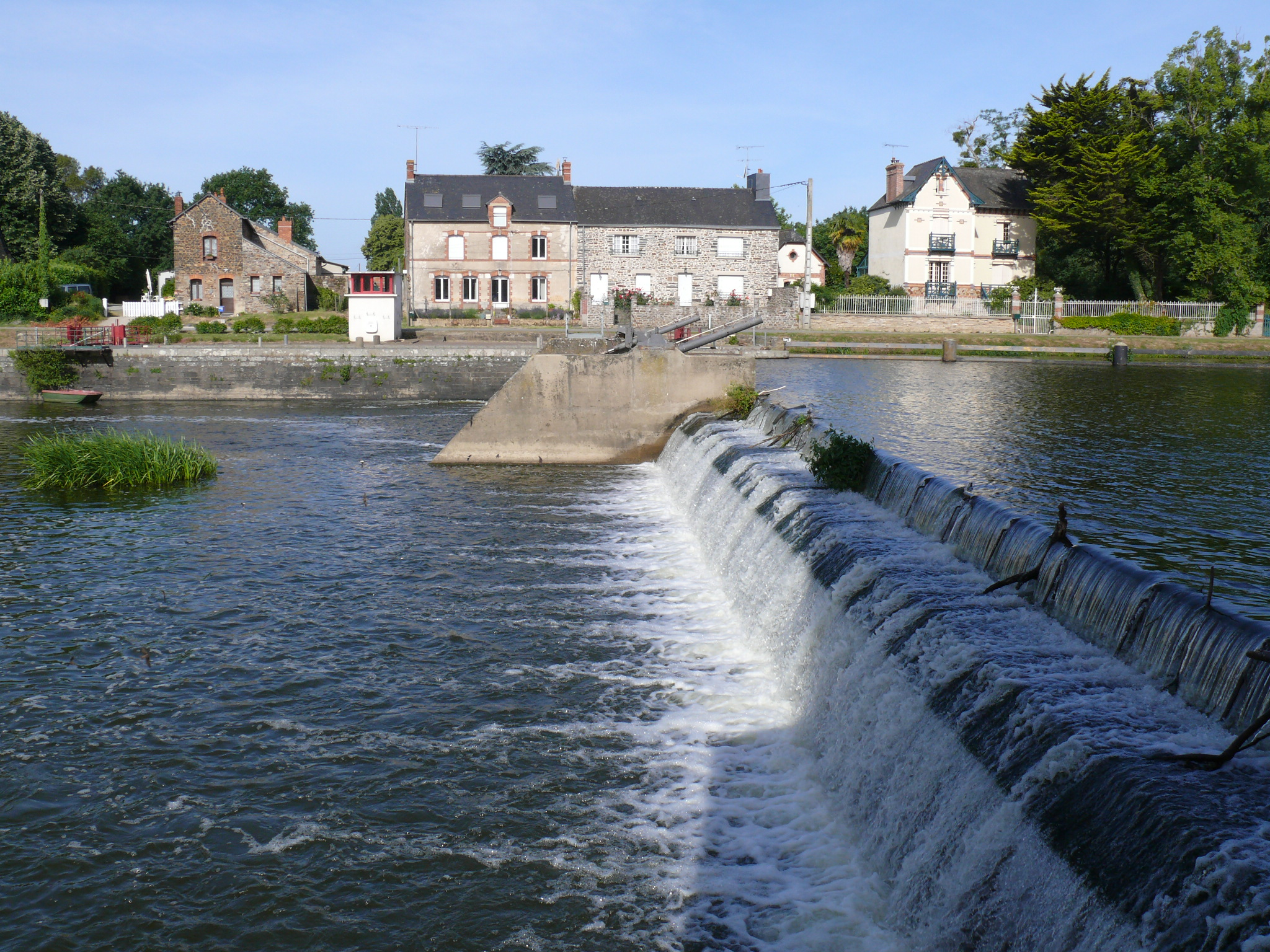

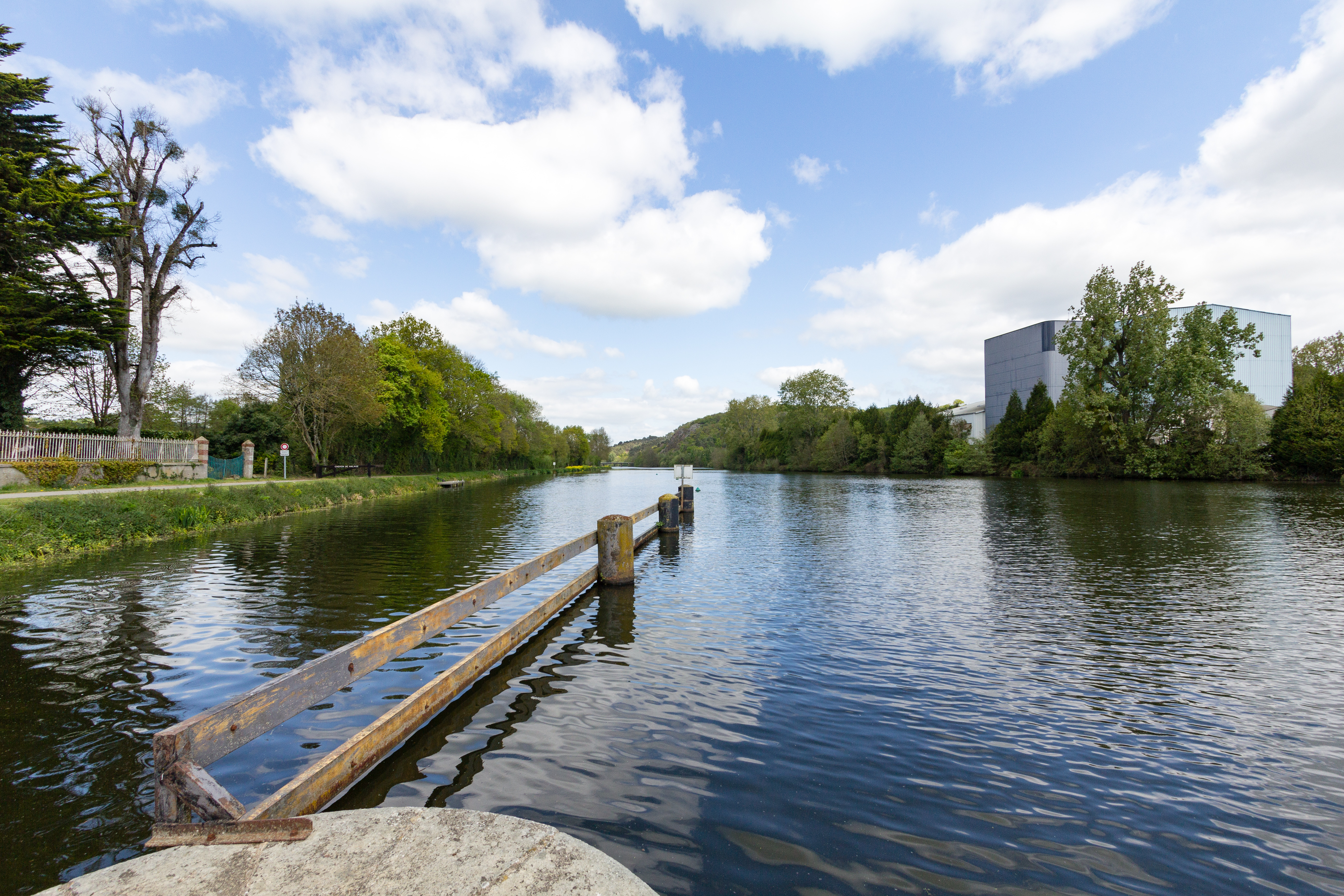

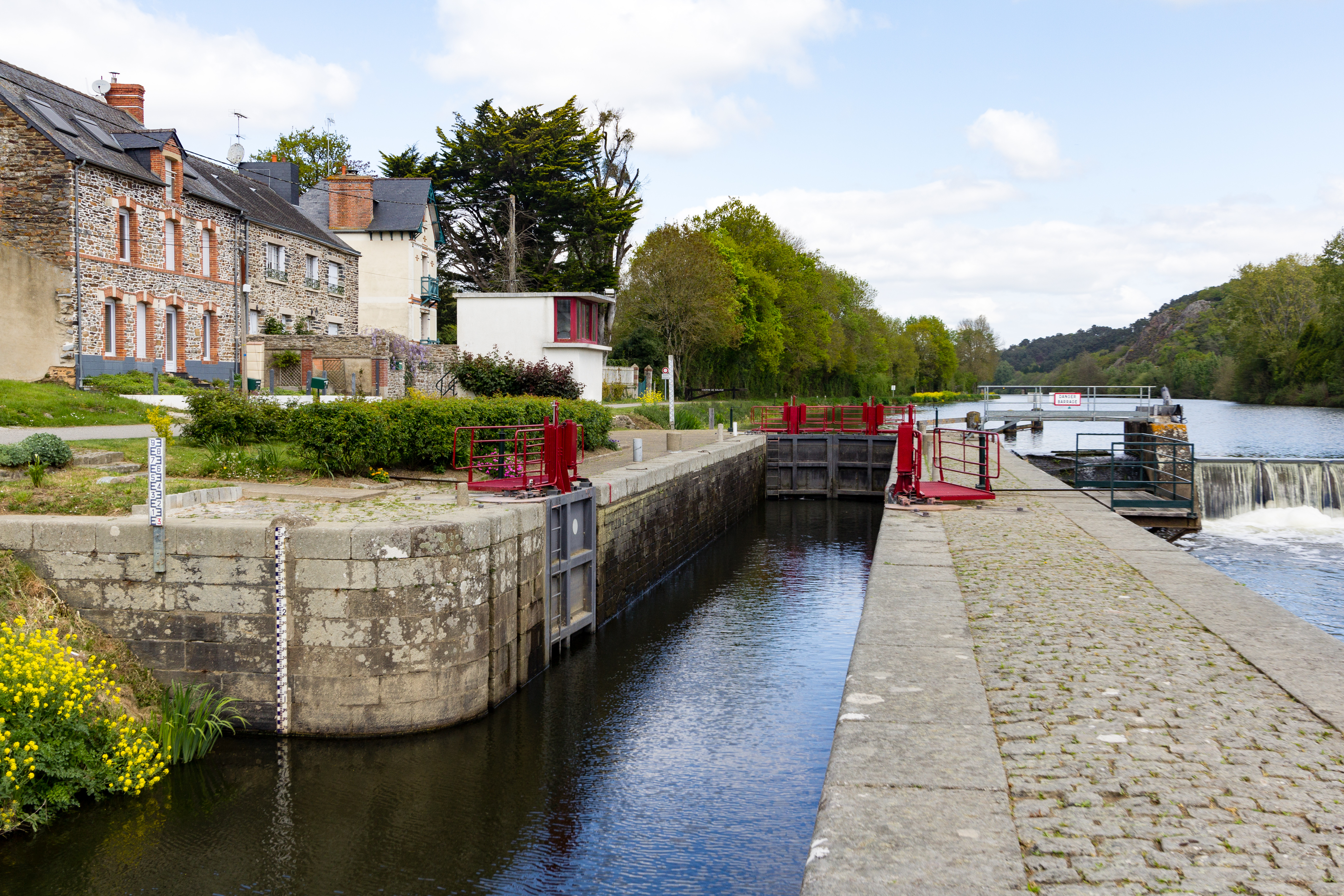

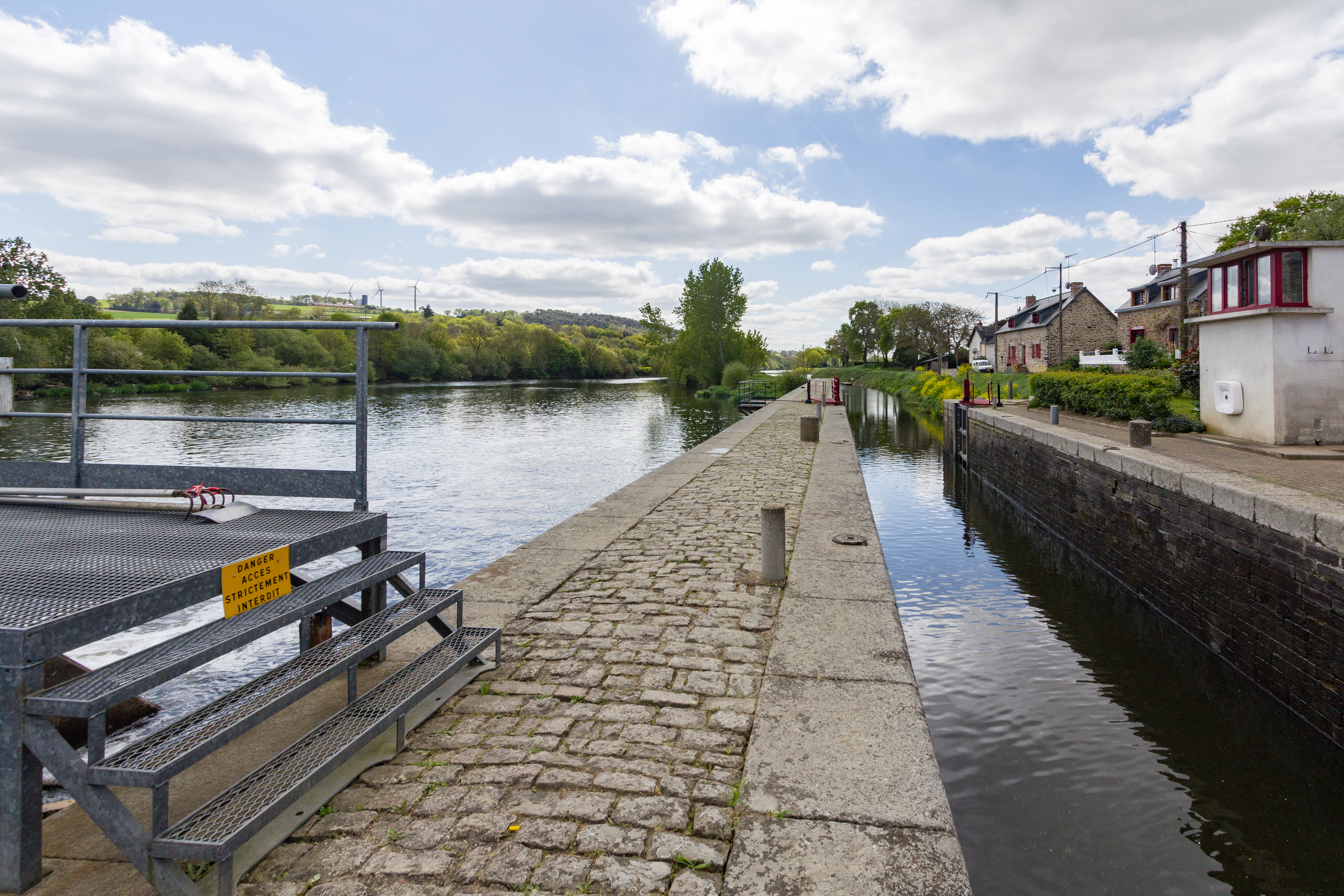

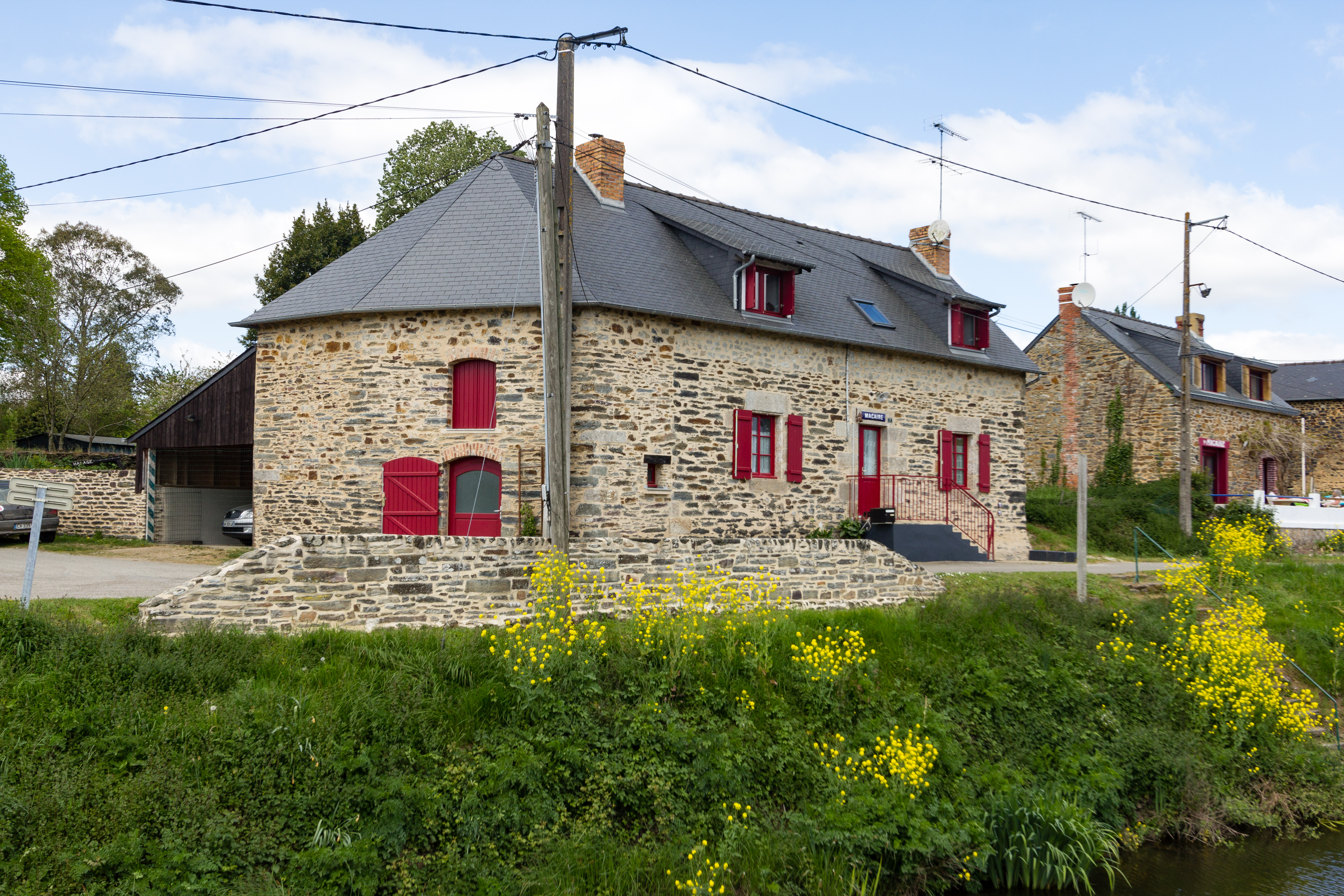
