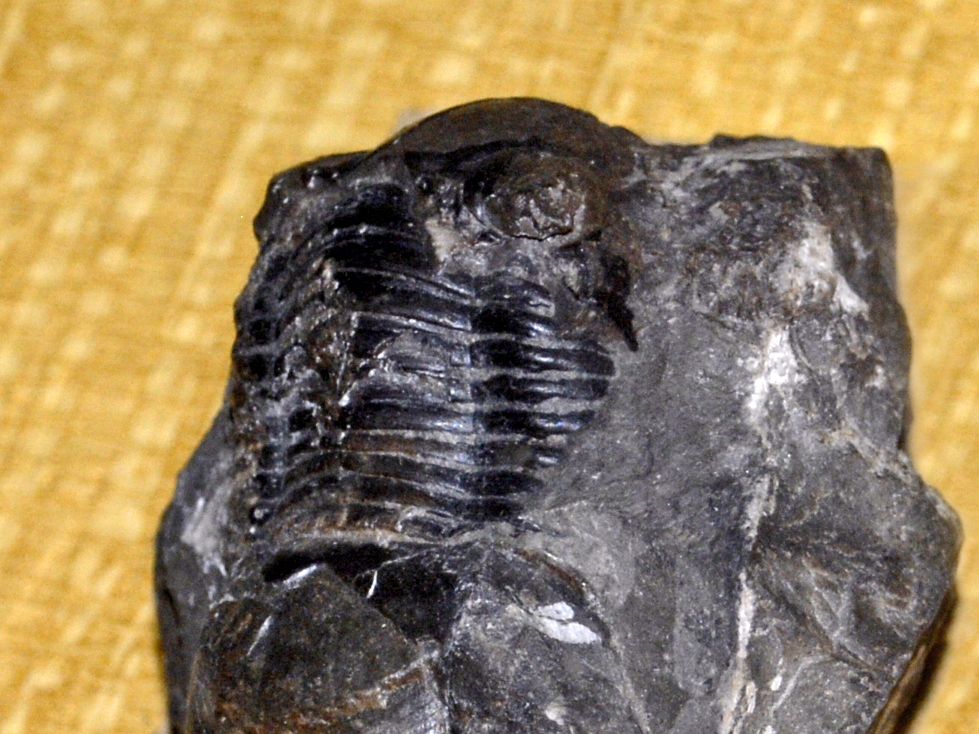
- Fossil of Scutellum brongniarti from Bohemia, on display at Galerie de paléontologie et d'anatomie comparée in Paris

Scientific classification
- Domain: Eukaryota
- Kingdom: Animalia
- Phylum: Arthropoda
- Class: †Trilobita
- Order: †Corynexochida
- Suborder: †Illaenina
- Family: †Styginidae; Vogdes, 1890

= Styginidae =

Styginidae Temporal range: Ordovician-Middle Devonian

Extinct family of trilobites

Styginidae is a family of trilobite in the order Corynexochida. Fossils of the various genera are found in marine strata throughout the world, aged from Ordovician up until the family's extinction during the Silurian.

== Genera ==
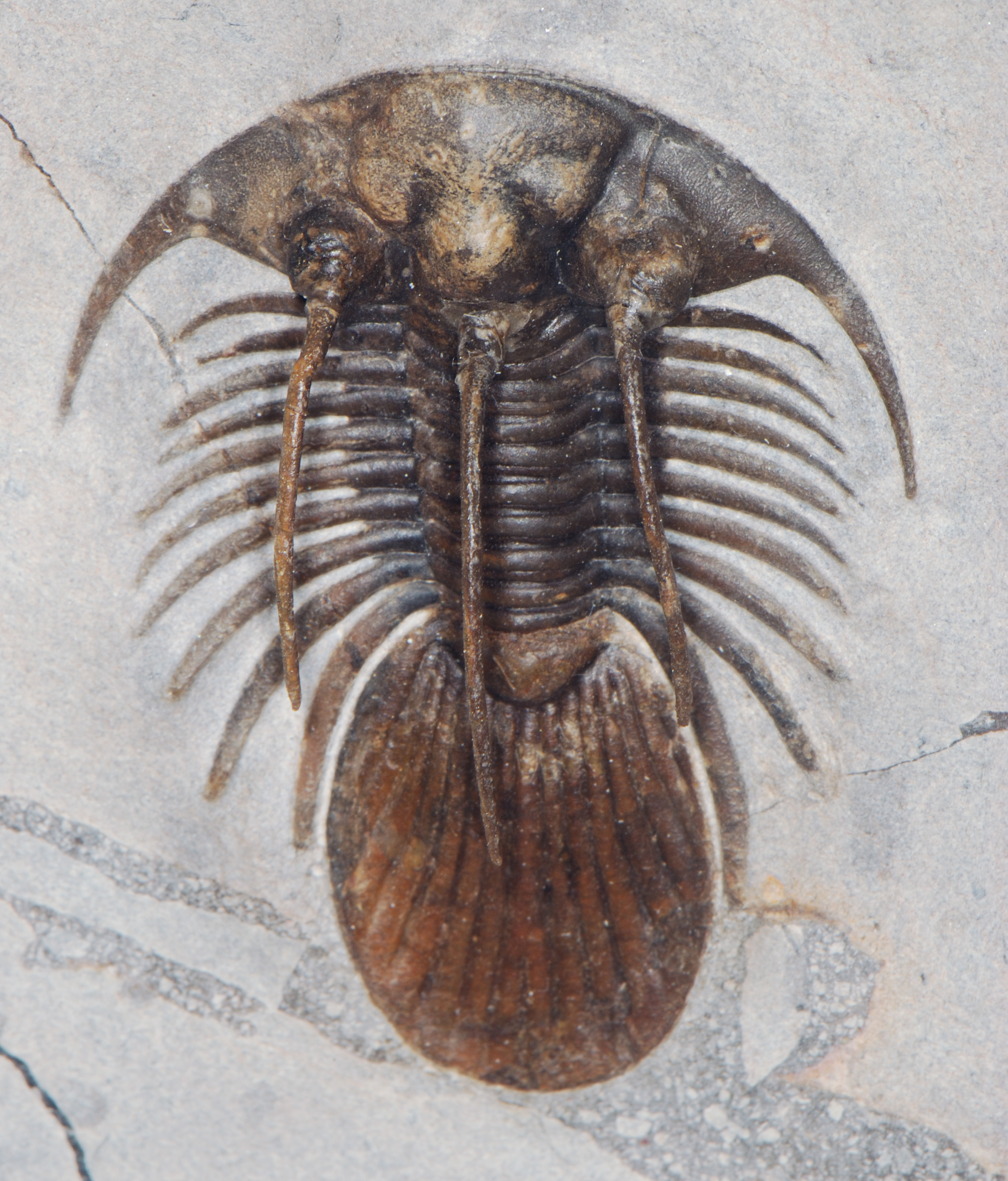
Kolihapeltis

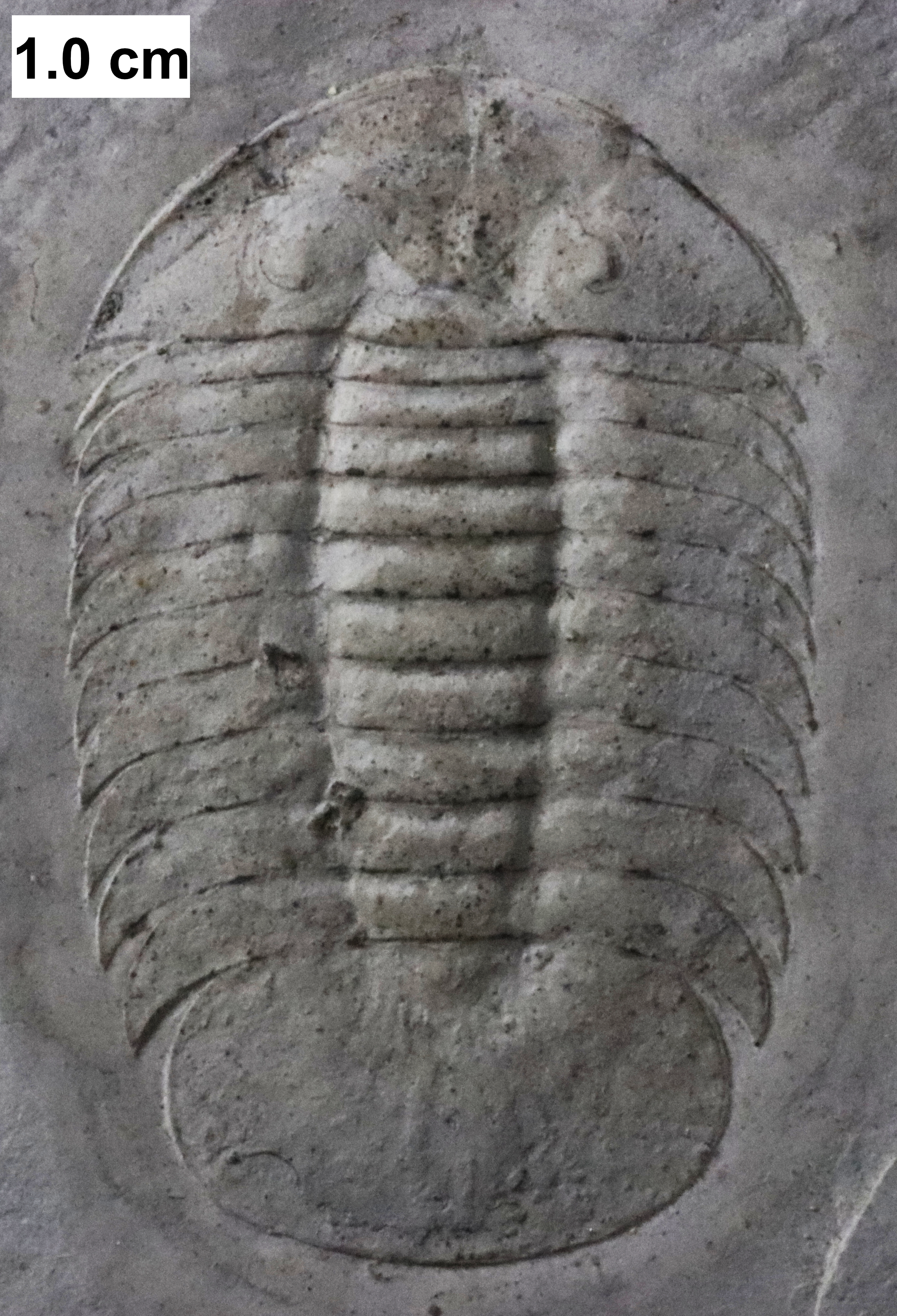
Meroperix, from the Silurian of Wisconsin

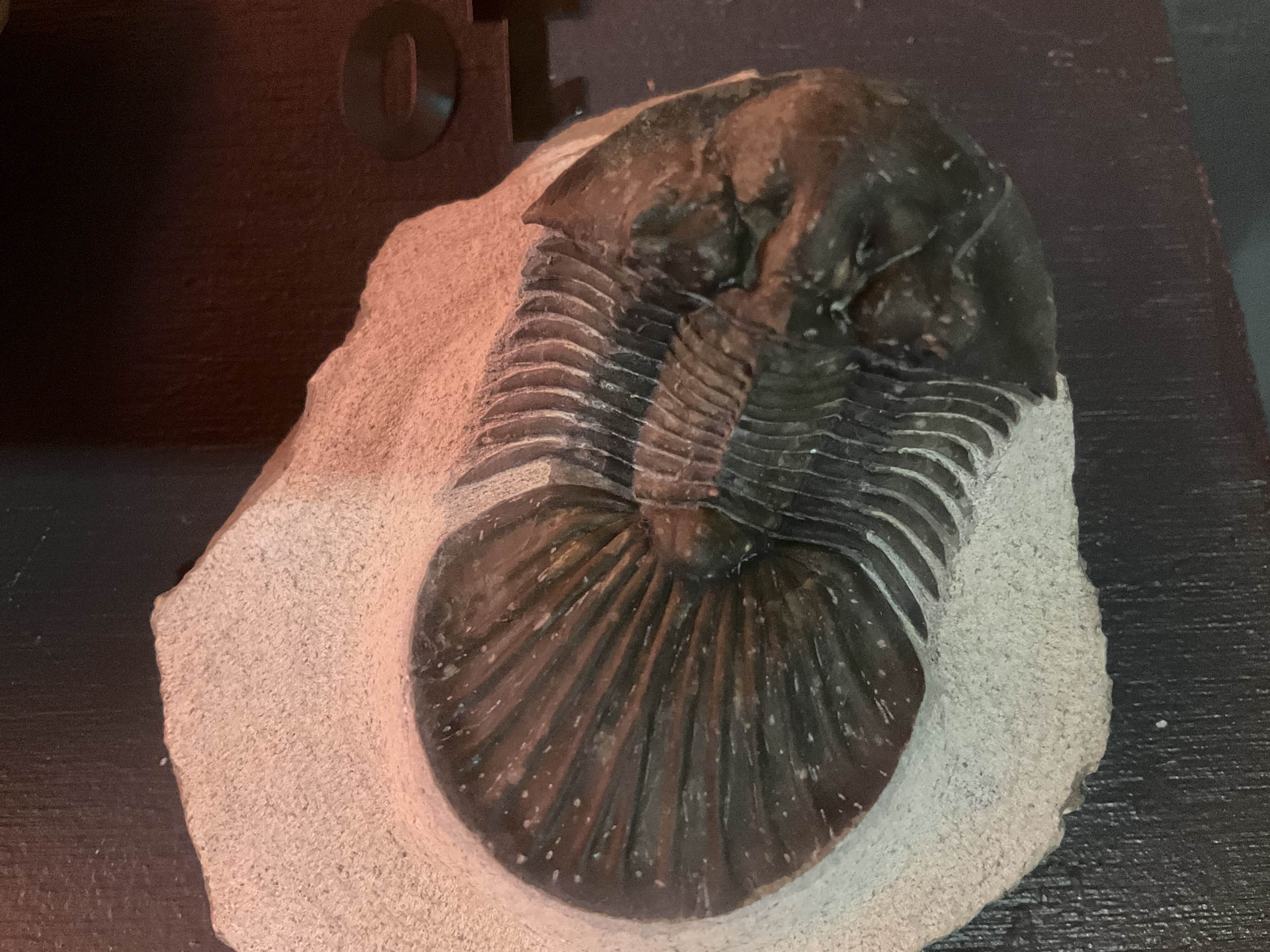
Platyscutellum spiniferum

Styginidae contains the following genera.

- Alceste Hawle and Corda 1847
- Ancyropyge Clark 1891
- Arctipeltis Maksimova 1986
- Australoscutellum Chatterton and Campbell 1980
- Bojoscutellum Snajdr 1958
- Breviscutellum Snajdr 1960
- Bronteopsis Nicholson and Etheridge 1879
- Bumastus Murchison 1839
- Cekovia Snajdr 1956
- Cornuscutellum Snajdr 1960
- Cybantyx Lane and Thomas 1978
- Decoroscutellum Snajdr 1958
- Delgadoa Thadeau 1947
- Dentaloscutellum Chatterton 1971
- Ekwanoscutellum Pribyl and Vanek 1972
- Eobronteus Reed 1928
- Eokosovopeltis Pribyl and Vanek 1972
- Failleana Chatterton and Ludvigson 1976
- Goldillaenoides Balashova 1959
- Goldillaenus Schindewolf 1924
- Illaenoides Weller 1907
- Kolihapeltis Prantl and Pribyl 1947
- Kosovopeltis Snajdr 1958
- Lamproscutellum Yin 1980
- Ligiscus Lane and Owens 1982
- Meitanillaenus Zhang 1974
- Meroperix Lane 1972
- Metascutellum Snajdr 1960
- Microscutellum Snajdr 1960
- Opoa Lane 1972
- Paracybantyx Ludvigson and Tripp 1990
- Paralejurus Hawle and Corda 1847
- Paraphillipsinella Lu and Chang 1974
- Perischoclonus Raymond 1925
- Phillipsinella Novak 1885
- Planiscutellum Richter 1956
- Platyscutellum Snajdr 1958
- Poroscutellum Snajdr 1958
- Protostygina Prantl and Pribyl 1949
- Pseudostygina Zhou 1982
- Radioscutellum Snajdr 1972
- Raymondaspis Pribyl 1949
- Rhaxeros Lane and Thomas 1980
- Scabriscutellum Richter and Richter 1956
- Scutellum Pusch 1833
- Spiniscutellum Snajdr 1960
- Stygina Salter 1853
- Tenuipeltis Lütke 1965
- Theamataspis Opik 1937
- Thomastus Opik 1953
- Thysanopeltella Kobayashi 1957
- Thysanopeltis Hawle and Corda 1847
- Turgicephalus Fortey 1980
- Waisfeldaspis Vaccari 2001
- Weberopeltis Maksimova
