= Jacques Bardoul =

Jacques Bardoul, born in Pléchâtel (in Brittany), was a Christian knight, belonging to the order of Saint John of Jerusalem, defender of Rhodes in 1480 under the orders of the Grand Master Pierre d'Aubusson.

== History ==
Jacques Bardoul was born at the Château du Plessis-Bardoul (15th century) in the commune of Pléchâtel in Ille-et-Vilaine, near the Landes de Bagaron and Chêne de Breslon. He was from the family of Foulque Bardoul, a Breton lord who became Keeper of the Seals of France (1349).

Recruited in Bordeaux by Antoine d'Aubusson (priory of Aquitaine), Jacques Bardoul defended Rhodes, besieged by an army led by the Ottoman sultan Mehmed II. During the fighting, Grand Master Pierre d'Aubusson was wounded several times. After three Turkish assaults and two months of fighting, on August 18, 1480, the Ottomans lifted the Siege of Rhode, leaving victory to the Hospitallers of Saint John of Jerusalem. His companions were : the knights Antoine Chabot, Pierre Foullet, Charles Capron, Antoine de Fervesai, Jean de la Haye, Milon-Saint-Léger, Pierre de Cluix, Philippe de Cluix and Renaud de Comblanc.
