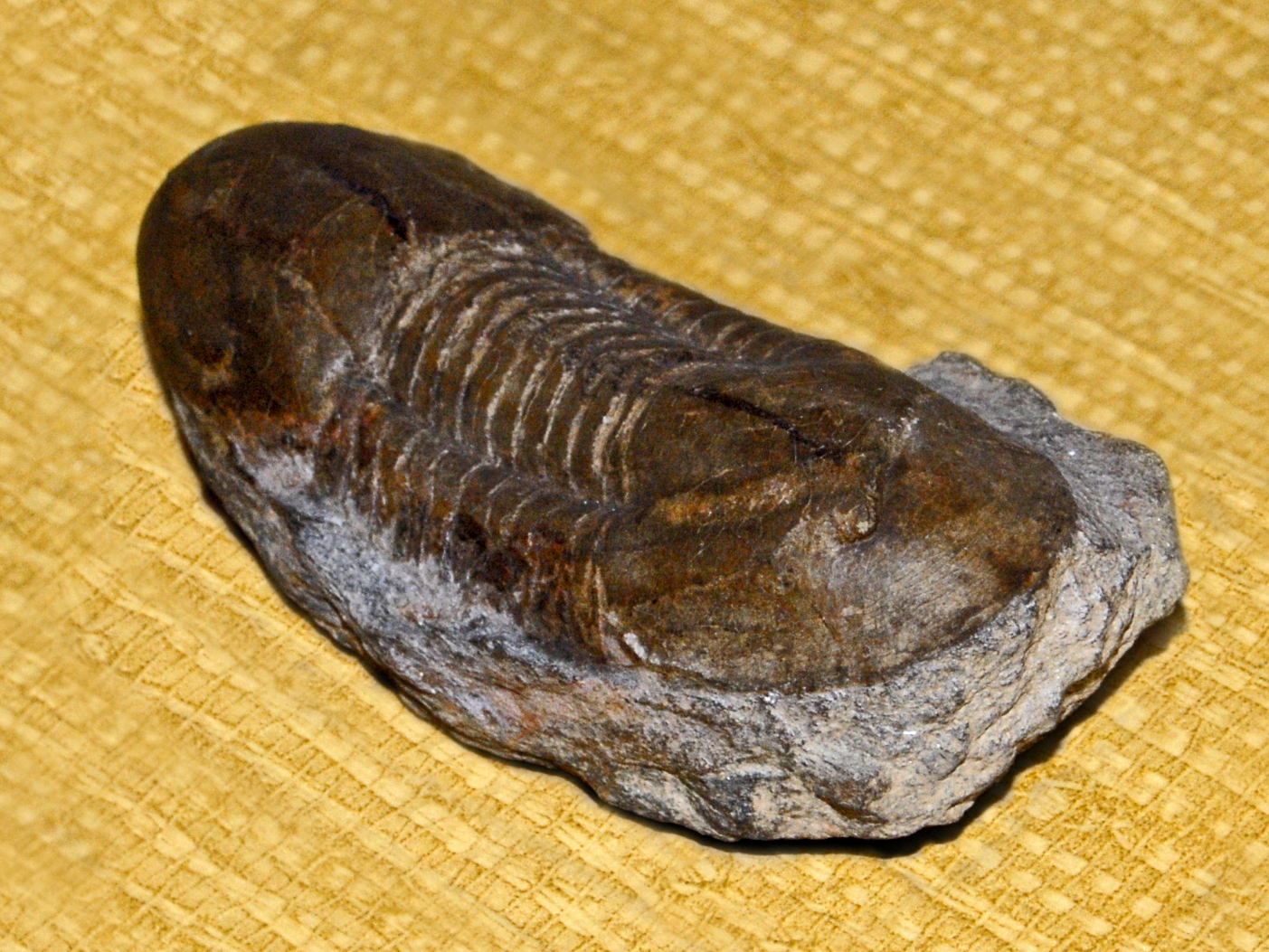
- Fossil of Ectillaenus advena from Pléchâtel, on display at Galerie de paléontologie et d'anatomie comparée in Paris

Scientific classification
- Kingdom: Animalia
- Phylum: Arthropoda
- Clade: †Artiopoda
- Class: †Trilobita
- Order: †Corynexochida
- Family: †Illaenidae
- Genus: †Ectillaenus; Salter 1867

= Ectillaenus =

Ectillaenus Temporal range: Ordovician

Genus of trilobites

Ectillaenus is a genus of trilobites in the order Corynexochida.

These nektobenthic carnivores lived in the Ordovician period, from 478.6 to 449.5 Ma.

== Taxonomy ==
Species include:

- †Ectillaenus advena (Barrande, 1872)
- †Ectillaenus benignensis (Novák in Perner, 1918)
- †Ectillaenus giganteus (Burmeister, 1843)
- †Ectillaenus holubi (Šnajdr, 1956)
- †Ectillaenus katzeri (Barrande, 1872)
- †Ectillaenus sarkaensis (Novák in Perner, 1918)

== Distribution ==
Fossils of this genus have been found in the Ordovician sediments of Czech Republic, France, Morocco, Portugal, Spain and United Kingdom, as well as in the Arenig of the United Kingdom.
