= Pygidium =

Posterior body part or shield of crustaceans and some other arthropods

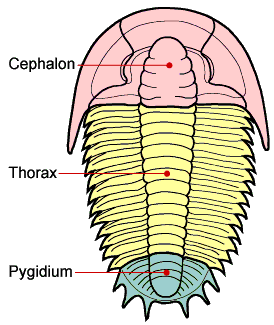
Diagram showing the location of the cephalon, thorax and pygidium of a trilobite.

The pygidium (pl.: pygidia) is the posterior body part or shield of crustaceans and some other arthropods, such as insects and the extinct trilobites. In groups other than insects, it contains the anus and, in females, the ovipositor. It is composed of fused body segments, sometimes with a tail, and separated from thoracic segments by an articulation.

== Chelicerates ==
In arachnids, the pygidium is formed by reduction of the last three opisthosomal segments to rings where there is no distinction between tergites and sternites. A pygidium is present in Palpigradi, Amblypygi, Uropygi, Schizomida, Ricinulei and in the extinct order Trigonotarbida. It is also present in early fossil representatives of horseshoe crabs.

== Trilobites ==
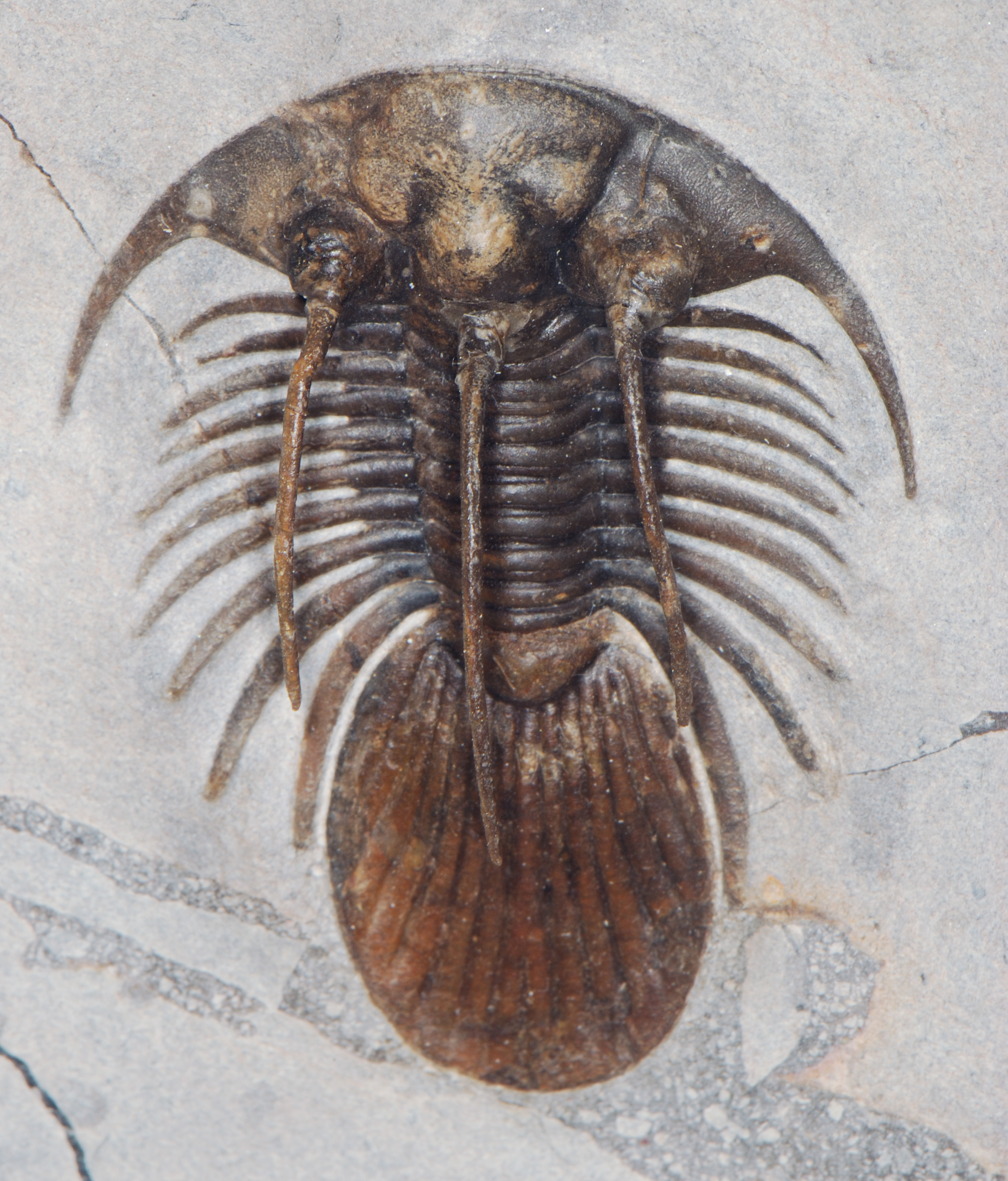
Kolihapeltis

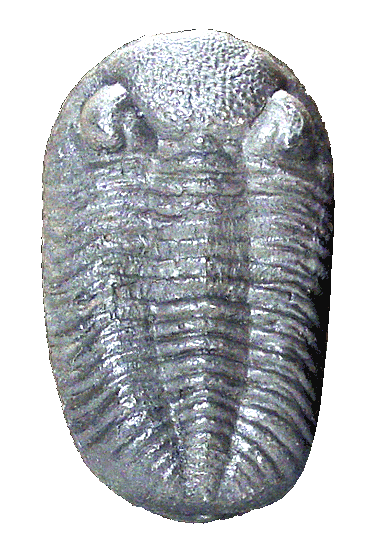
Phacops rana

The pygidium of Kolihapeltis is strikingly heteronomous, while that of Phacops is homonomous. Both are subisopygous.

In trilobites, the pygidium can range from extremely small (much smaller than the head, or cephalon) to larger than the cephalon. They can be smooth, as in order Asaphida, or spiny, as in order Lichida. They can be classified into four categories according to their relative size in comparison to the cephalon.

- Micropygous – the pygidium is considerably smaller than the cephalon.
- Subisopygous – the pygidium is slightly smaller than the cephalon.
- Isopygous – the cephalon and the pygidium are more or less of equal size.
- Macropygous – the pygidium is larger than the cephalon.

They can further be subdivided in their morphological similarity to the thorax. Pygidia that are similar in shape and form to the thoracic segments are termed homonomous, while pygidia that vary significantly from the shape and form of the thoracic segments (like by the presence or absence of spines) are heteronomous.

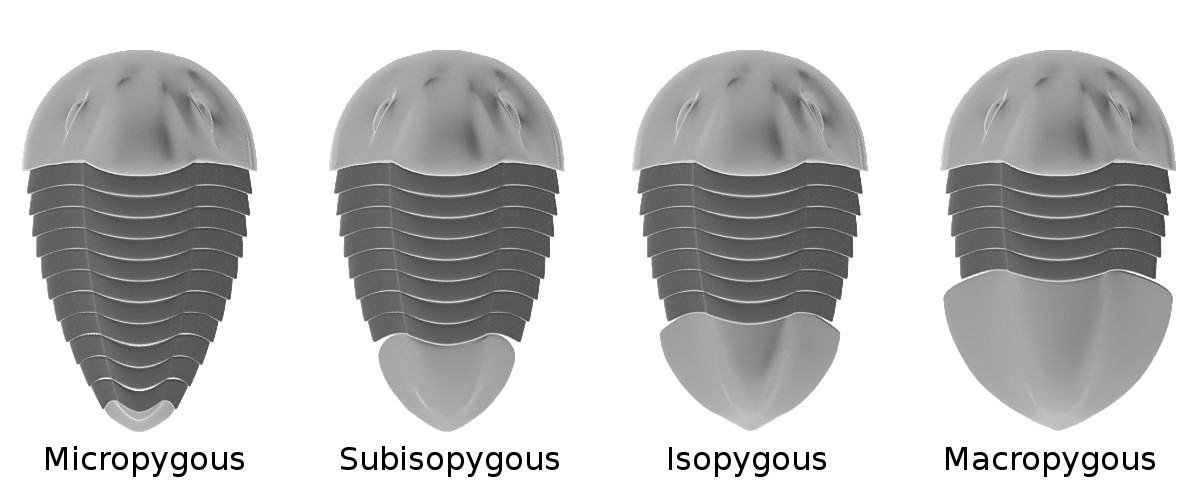

== Insects ==
In insects, the pygidium is the dorsal tergite of the last external abdominal segment.

== Other uses ==
Pygidium is also a superseded genus of fish of the family Trichomycteridae. Most species of this genus have been reassigned to the genus Trichomycterus. Some worms also have a pygidial appendage, like Polychaeta of the genus Ophryotrocha

== See also ==
- Opisthosoma
- Telson
