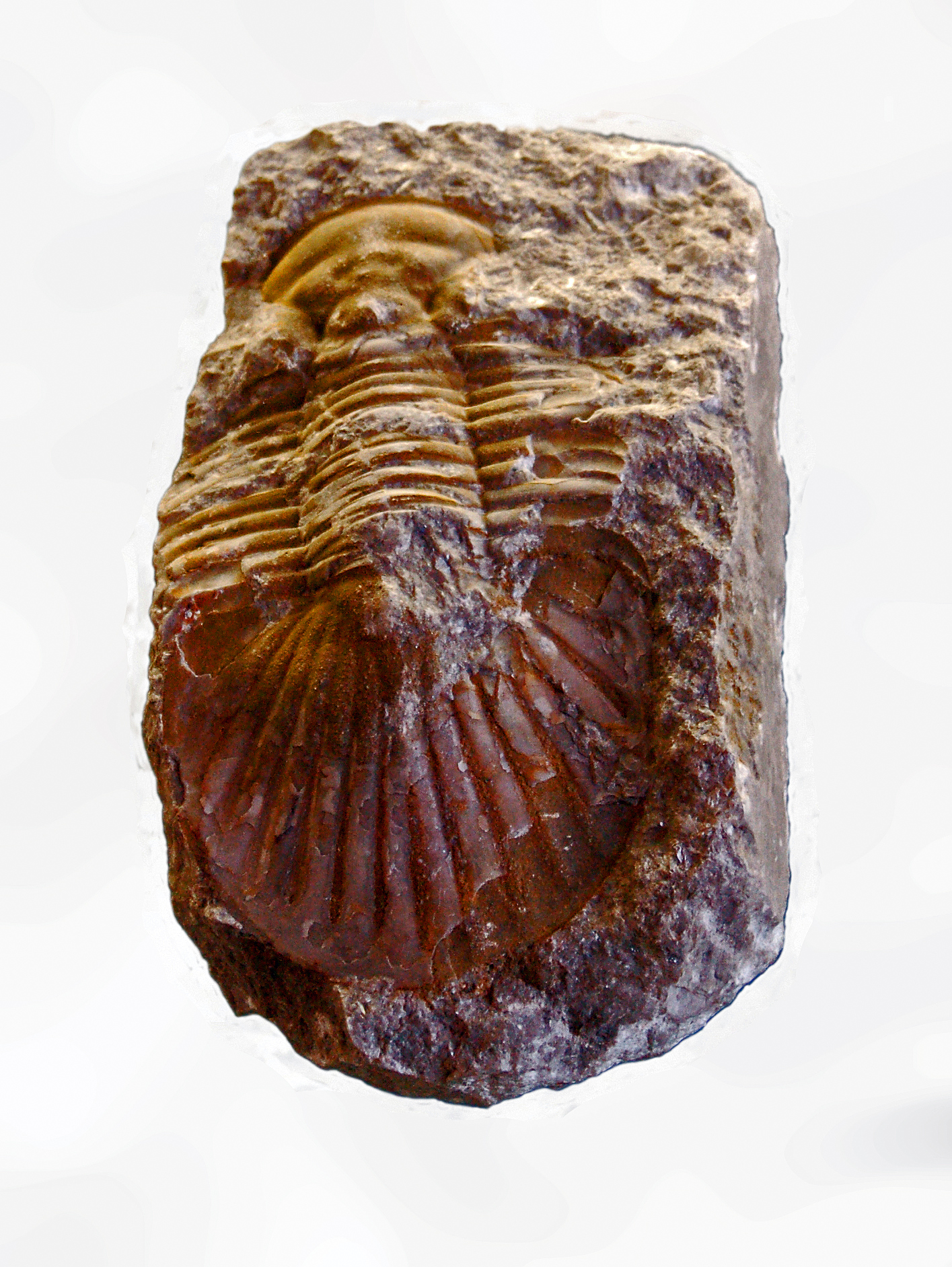
- Bojoscutellum paliferum from Koněprusy, Czech Republic at the National Museum (Prague)

Scientific classification
- Kingdom: Animalia
- Phylum: Arthropoda
- Clade: †Artiopoda
- Class: †Trilobita
- Order: †Corynexochida
- Family: †Styginidae
- Genus: †Bojoscutellum; Šnajdr, 1958

Synonyms
- Holomeris Hawle & Corda, 1847

= Bojoscutellum =

Bojoscutellum Temporal range: Devonian

Genus of trilobites

Bojoscutellum is a genus of trilobites in the order Corynexochida family Styginidae. These trilobites were nektobenthic carnivores that lived in the Devonian period in the Eifelian age (395 million years ago).

== Distribution ==
Devonian of the Czech Republic and Morocco.

== Species ==
- Bojoscutellum angusticeps † (Barrande, 1852)
- Bojoscutellum conspersum † (Prantl, 1949)
- Bojoscutellum crassicostatum † Šnajdr, 1960
- Bojoscutellum havliceki † (Vaněk, 1970)
- Bojoscutellum intermixtus † (Hawle et Corda, 1847)
- Bojoscutellum ivanense † (Barrande, 1852)
- Bojoscutellum koneprusiense † Šnajdr, 1960
- Bojoscutellum meridianum † (Barrois, 1886)
- Bojoscutellum paliferum † (Beyrich, 1845)
- Bojoscutellum pseudopaliferum † Šnajdr, 1960
- Bojoscutellum sieberi † (Hawle et Corda, 1847)
- Bojoscutellum tjazovae † Maksimova, 1979
- Bojoscutellum transversum † (Hawle et Corda, 1847)
- Bojoscutellum uralicum † Maksimova, 1979

== Gallery ==
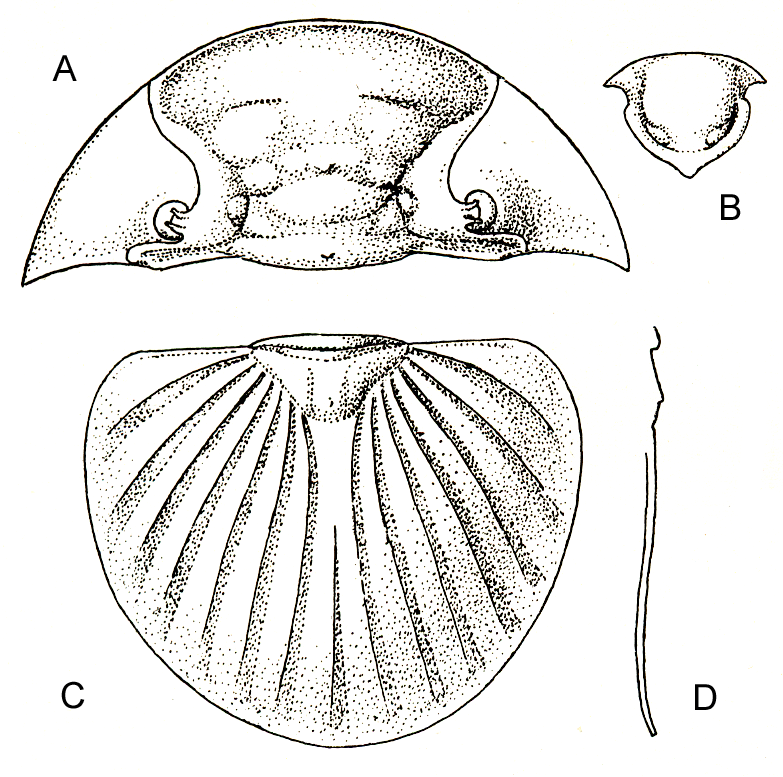
Schematic Trilobite Bojoscutellum paliferum (Beyrich, 1845). A) cephalon B) hypostome C) pygidium D) width of pygidium
