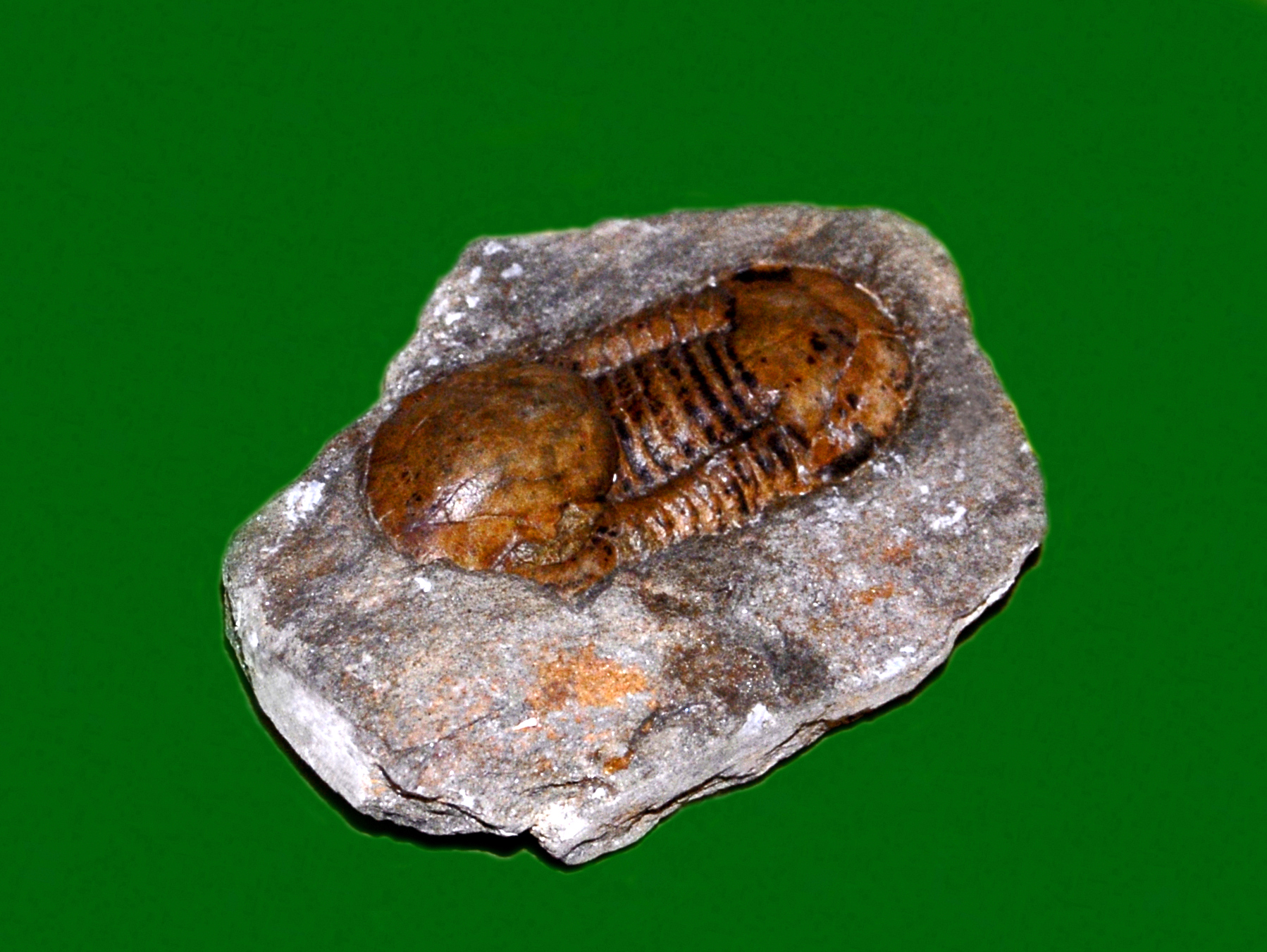
- Fossil of Panderia beaumonti from Ille-et-Vilaine, on display at Galerie de paléontologie et d'anatomie comparée in Paris

Scientific classification
- Domain: Eukaryota
- Kingdom: Animalia
- Phylum: Arthropoda
- Class: †Trilobita
- Order: †Corynexochida
- Family: †Panderiidae
- Genus: †Panderia; Volborth, 1863

= Panderia =

Panderia Temporal range: Ordovician

Extinct genus of trilobites

Panderia is a genus of trilobites in the order Corynexochida.

These nektobenthic carnivores lived in the Ordovician period, from 466.0 to 443.7 Ma.

== Species ==
- Panderia baltica
- Panderia beaumonti (Rouault 1847)
- Panderia derivata
- Panderia edita
- Panderia erratica
- Panderia hadelandica
- Panderia insulana
- Panderia lerkakensis
- Panderia lewisi Salter 1867
- Panderia lubrica
- Panderia megalophthalma Linnarsson, 1869 (p. 26)
- Panderia migratoria
- Panderia parvula (Holm 1882)
- Panderia ramosa
- Panderia triquetra Volborth 1863

== Distribution ==
Fossils of this genus have been found in the Ordovician sediments of Norway, France, Spain, Sweden and United Kingdom.
