= Pléchâtel =

Pléchâtel Plegastell (Breton)
- Commune
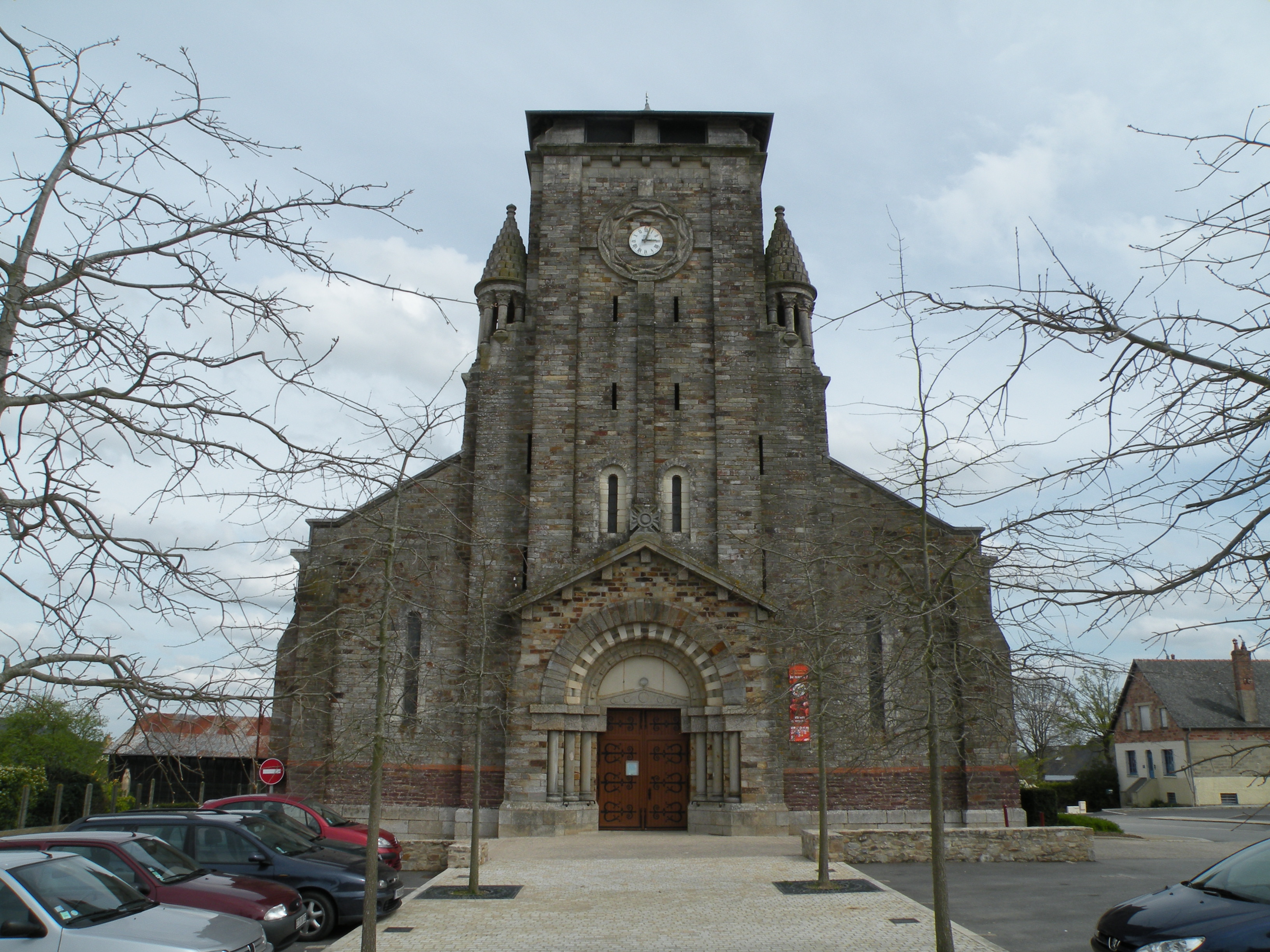
- The church of Pléchâtel
- Location of Pléchâtel
- Location within France Location within Brittany
- Coordinates: 47°53′43″N 1°44′50″W
- Country: France
- Region: Brittany
- Department: Ille-et-Vilaine
- Arrondissement: Redon
- Canton: Bain-de-Bretagne

Government
  - Mayor (2020–2026): Éric Bourasseau
- Area^{1}: 36.32 km^{2} (14.02 sq mi)
- Highest elevation: 116 m (381 ft)
- Lowest elevation: 7 m (23 ft)
- Population (2023): 2,833
  - Density: 78.00/km^{2} (202.0/sq mi)
- Time zone: UTC+01:00 (CET)
  - Summer (DST): UTC+02:00 (CEST)
- INSEE/Postal code: 35221 /35470
- ^{1} French Land Register data, which excludes lakes, ponds, glaciers > 1 km^{2} (0.386 sq mi or 247 acres) and river estuaries.

Pléchâtel (French pronunciation: [pleʃatɛl]; Breton: Plegastell) is a commune in the Ille-et-Vilaine department of Brittany in northwestern France.

== Geography ==
The river Semnon forms all of the commune's northern border, then flows into the Vilaine, which forms all of its western border.

== Population ==
Inhabitants of Pléchâtel are called Pléchâtellois in French.

Historical population
| Year | Pop. | ±% p.a. |
|---|---|---|
| 1968 | 1,512 | — |
| 1975 | 1,559 | +0.44% |
| 1982 | 1,780 | +1.91% |
| 1990 | 1,834 | +0.37% |
| 1999 | 1,946 | +0.66% |
| 2007 | 2,574 | +3.56% |
| 2012 | 2,711 | +1.04% |
| 2017 | 2,789 | +0.57% |
| 2023 | 2,833 | +0.26% |
Source: INSEE

== Notable people ==
Jacques Bardoul, born in Pléchâtel, was a Christian knight, belonging to the order of Saint John of Jerusalem, defender of Rhodes in 1480 under the orders of the Grand Master Pierre d'Aubusson.

== See also ==
- Communes of the Ille-et-Vilaine department
- Moulin de Macaire
