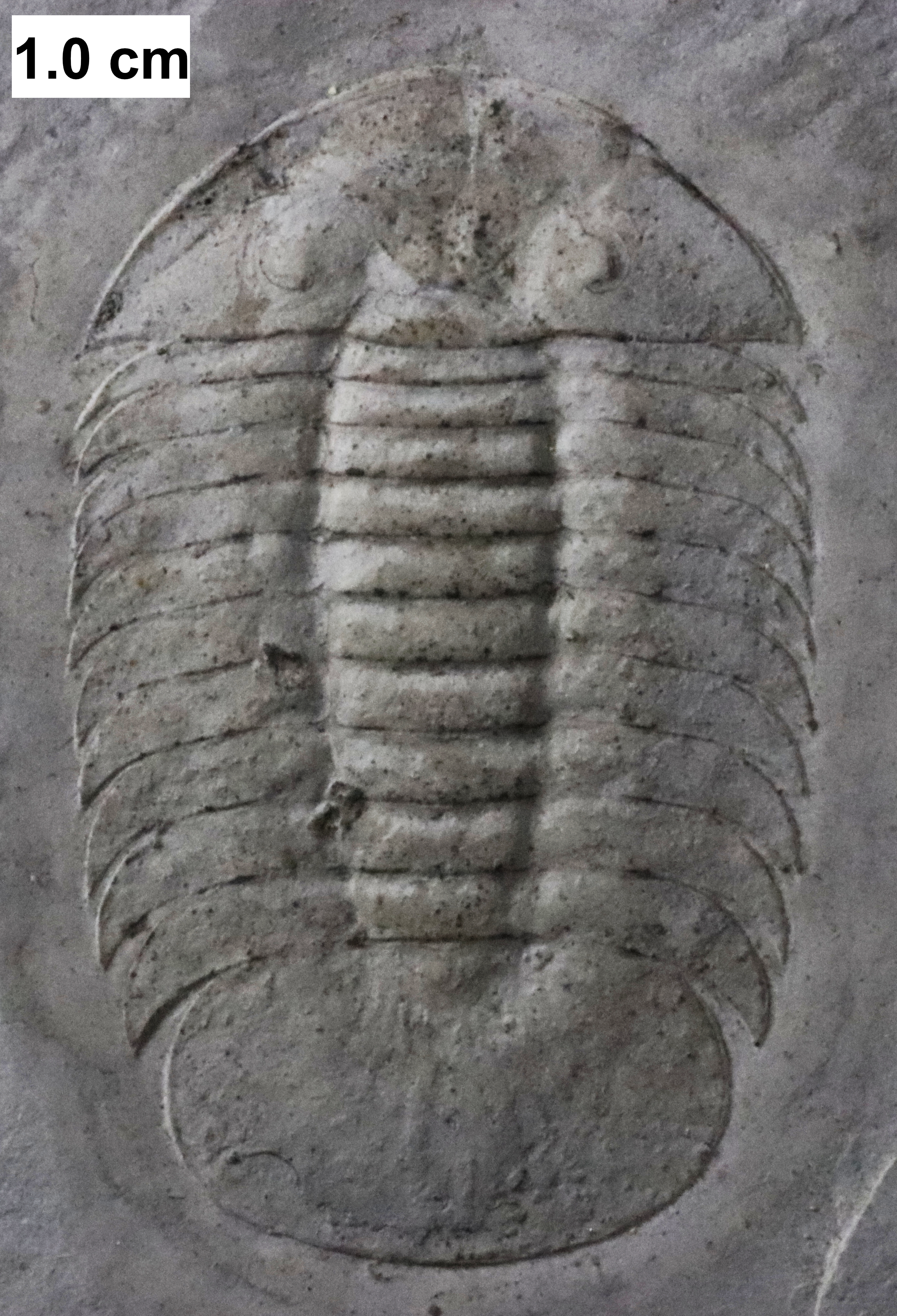

Scientific classification
- Domain: Eukaryota
- Kingdom: Animalia
- Phylum: Arthropoda
- Class: †Trilobita
- Order: †Corynexochida
- Family: †Styginidae
- Genus: †Meroperix; Lane, 1972

= Meroperix =

Meroperix Temporal range: Silurian

Genus of trilobite

Meroperix is a genus of styginid trilobite in the order Corynexochida that lived during the Silurian period.
