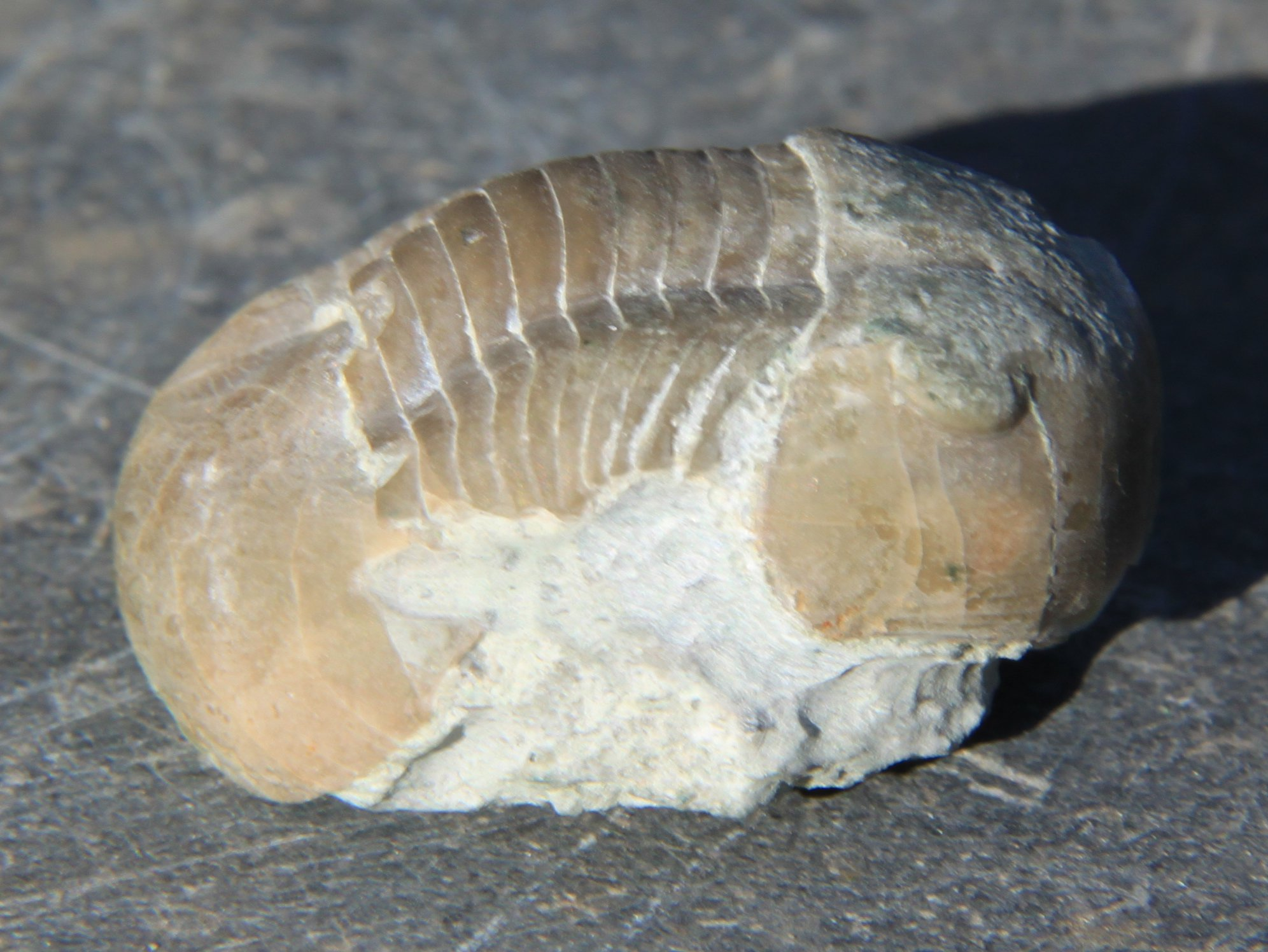
- Illaenus sarsi, 25mm

Scientific classification
- Domain: Eukaryota
- Kingdom: Animalia
- Phylum: Arthropoda
- Class: †Trilobita
- Order: †Corynexochida
- Suborder: †Illaenina
- Family: †Illaenidae; Hawle and Corda, 1847

= Illaenidae =

Illaenidae Temporal range: Ordovician–Silurian

Family of trilobites

The Illaenidae are a family of trilobites in the order Corynexochida. 223 currently accepted species in 24 genera are known from the Ordovician. Some scholars include the Panderiidae in the Illaenidae, but this is not generally supported.

== Distribution ==
Illaenus? priscus from Salair and Illaenus? berkutensis from the Malyi Karatau, Kazakhstan (both Lower Tremadocian), are both very poorly known and it remains uncertain to which family they could best be assigned. The first certain Illaenid is I. hinomotoensis from the Upper Tremadocian of North China and South Korea. The earliest species known from Laurentia (western Ireland) is I. weaveri, probably latest Floian. These early occurrences are from the tropics, but during the Darriwilian the family spread over southern Gondwana, and became cosmopolitan for the remainder of the Ordovician, although most genera had limited distributions. The genus Stenopareia survived the Ordovician–Silurian extinction events and the family slightly rebounded with 26 species divided over three genera during the Silurian. Quadratillaenus tewoensis from North China is the youngest species known (Pridoli Epoch).

== Genera ==
- Bumastoides Whittington 1954
- Cryptonymus Eichwald 1825
- Deucalion Shtsheglov 1827
- Dysplanus Burmeister 1843
- Ectillaenus Salter 1867
- Harpillaenus Whittington 1963
- Hyboaspis Raymond 1920
- Hydrolaenus Salter 1867
- Illaenus Dalman 1827
- Nanillaenus Jaanusson 1954
- Octillaenus Salter 1867
- Parillaenus Jaanusson 1954
- Platillaenus Jaanusson 1954
- Ptilillaenus Lu 1962
- Rhodope Angelin 1854
- Stenopareia Holm 1886
- Thaleops Conrad 1843
- Ulugtella Petrunina 1975
- Zbirovia Snajdr 1956
- Zdicella Snajdr 1956
- Zetillaenus Snajdr 1957
