= Thysanopeltis =

Thysanopeltis Temporal range: Early-Middle Devonian

Scientific classification
- Domain: Eukaryota
- Kingdom: Animalia
- Phylum: Arthropoda
- Class: †Trilobita
- Order: †Corynexochida
- Family: †Styginidae
- Genus: †Thysanopeltis; Hawle and Corda, 1847

Extinct genus of trilobites

Thysanopeltis is a genus of trilobite that lived from the Early to the Middle Devonian. Its remains have been found in Africa and Europe.
