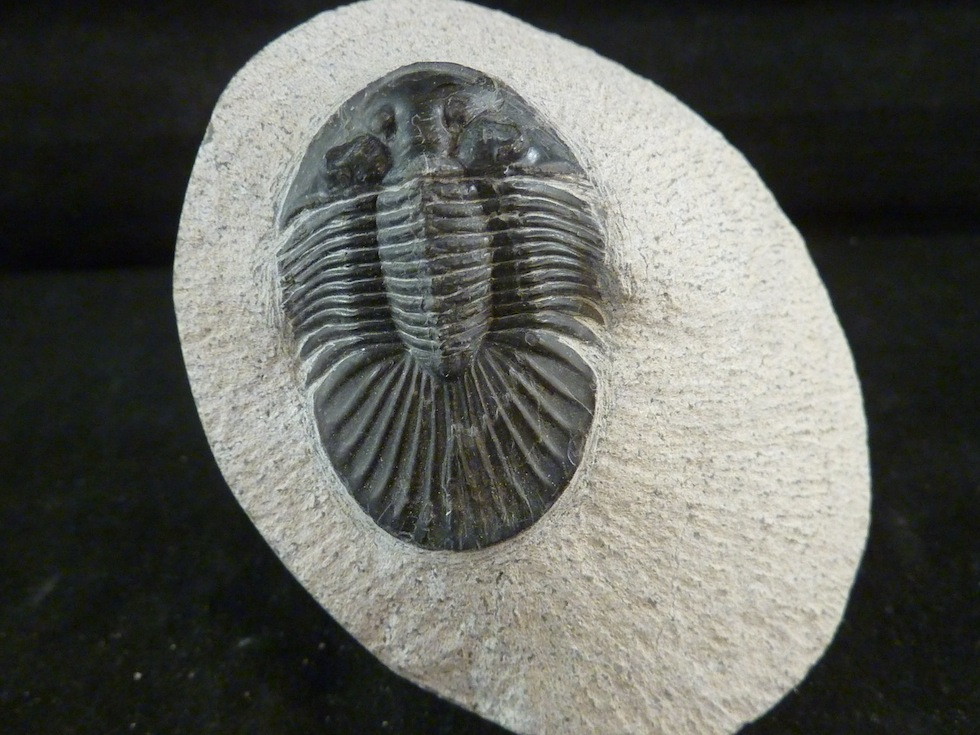
- Fossils of Scutellum species from the Atlas Mountains

Scientific classification
- Domain: Eukaryota
- Kingdom: Animalia
- Phylum: Arthropoda
- Class: †Trilobita
- Order: †Corynexochida
- Family: †Styginidae
- Genus: †Scutellum; Pusch, 1833

Synonyms
- Brontes Goldfuss, 1839; Bronteus Goldfuss, 1843; Goldfussia Bronn, 1848; Goldfussius Barrande, 1852; Goldius de Koninck, 1841

= Scutellum (trilobite) =

Genus of trilobites

Scutellum was a genus of trilobite in the family Styginidae. They lived during the Devonian Period and are most often found in the Atlas Mountain area of Morocco.
