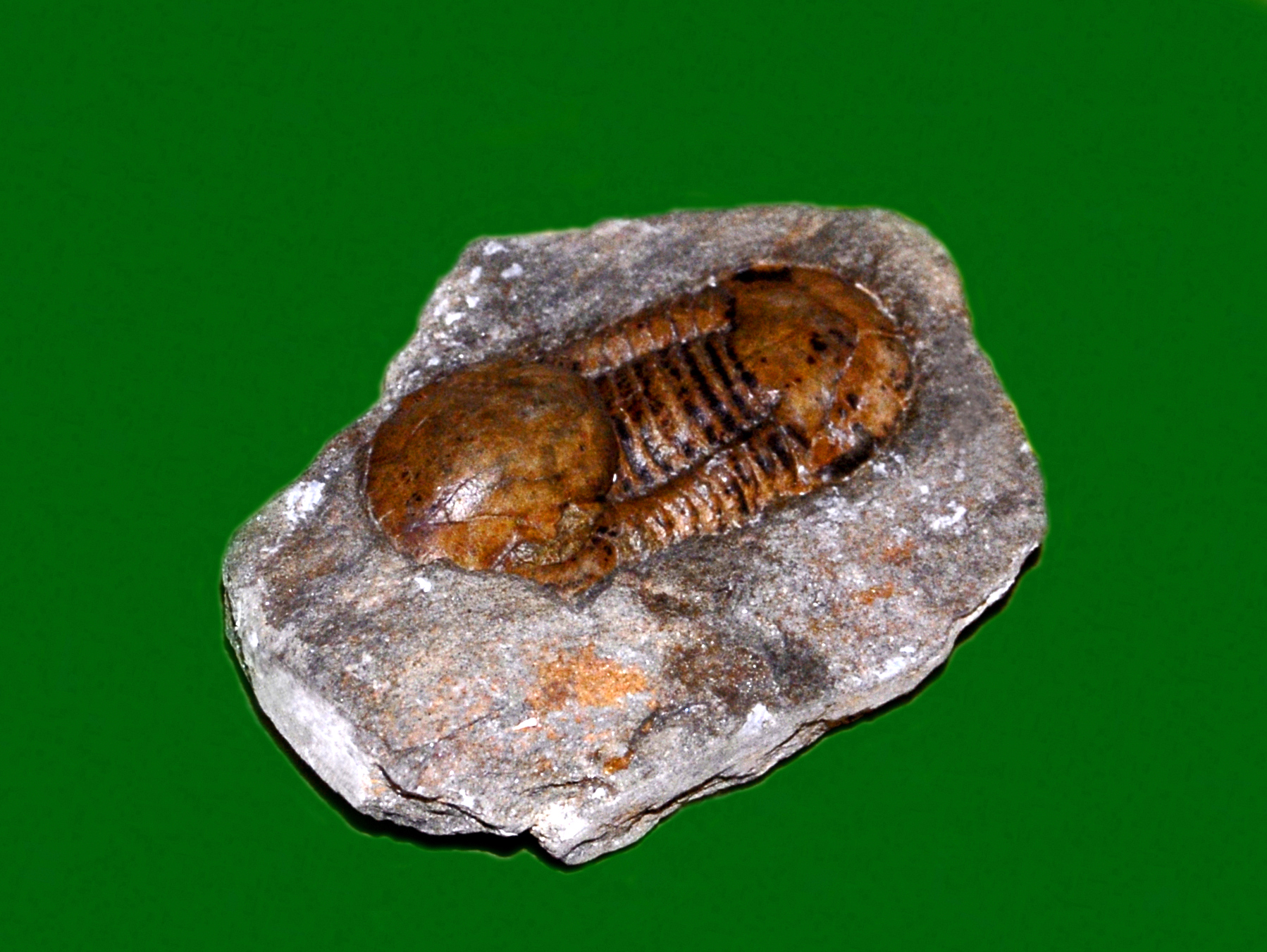
- Fossil of Panderia beaumonti from Ille-et-Vilaine, on display at Galerie de paléontologie et d'anatomie comparée in Paris

Scientific classification
- Kingdom: Animalia
- Phylum: Arthropoda
- Clade: †Artiopoda
- Class: †Trilobita
- Order: †Corynexochida
- Suborder: †Illaenina
- Family: †Panderiidae; Bruton, 1968

= Panderiidae =

Panderiidae Temporal range: Ordovician

Extinct family of trilobites

Panderiidae is a family of trilobites in the order Corynexochida.

These nektobenthic carnivores lived in the Ordovician period, from 488.3 to 443.7 Ma.

== Genera ==
- Hemibarrandia
- Panderia

== Distribution ==
Fossils of this family have been found in the Ordovician sediments of Czech Republic, France, Norway, Spain, Sweden and United Kingdom.
