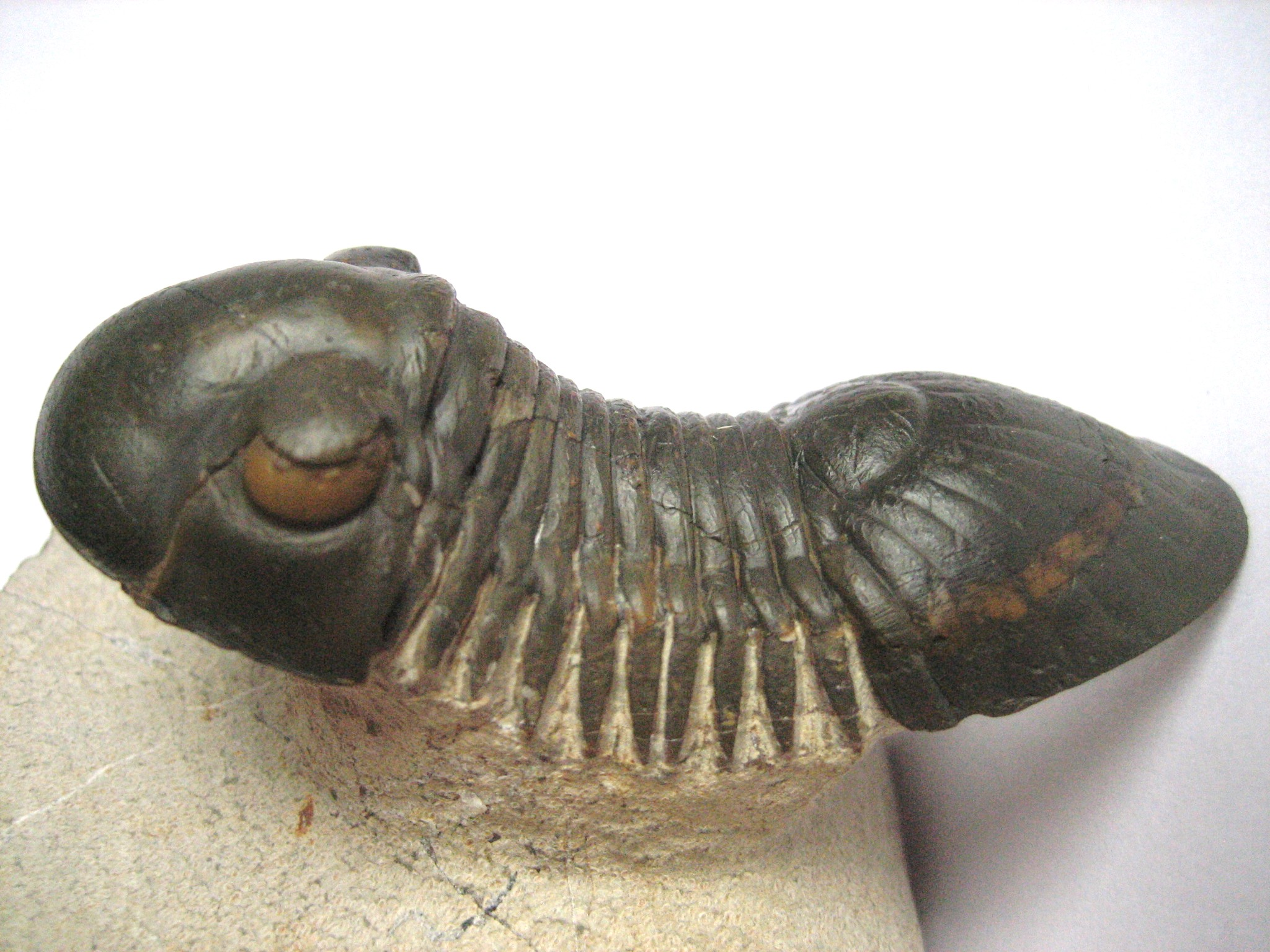
- Paralejurus sp. from Atlas Mountains, south of Morocco

Scientific classification
- Domain: Eukaryota
- Kingdom: Animalia
- Phylum: Arthropoda
- Class: †Trilobita
- Order: †Corynexochida
- Family: †Styginidae
- Genus: †Paralejurus; Hawle and Corda, 1847

= Paralejurus =

Paralejurus Temporal range: Late Silurian–Middle Devonian

Genus of trilobites

Paralejurus is a genus of trilobite from the Late Silurian to the Middle Devonian of Africa and Europe.

== Features ==
These animals, up to nine centimeters long, had an oval outline and a strongly arched exoskeleton. The cephalon has a smooth, detail-poor surface and an almost inconspicuous occipital bone behind the glabella in the transition to the thorax. The facet eyes have crescent-shaped lids. The thorax consists of ten narrow segments and a clearly arched and broad axial lobe ( rhachis ). The pygidium is very broad and denominate. The axillary lobe ends roundly and upwards. From this elevation, twelve to fourteen fine furrows extend radially. In contrast to the genus Scutellum with a pygidium with distinct furrows, in Paralejurus the pygidium was very smooth and strongly fused.
