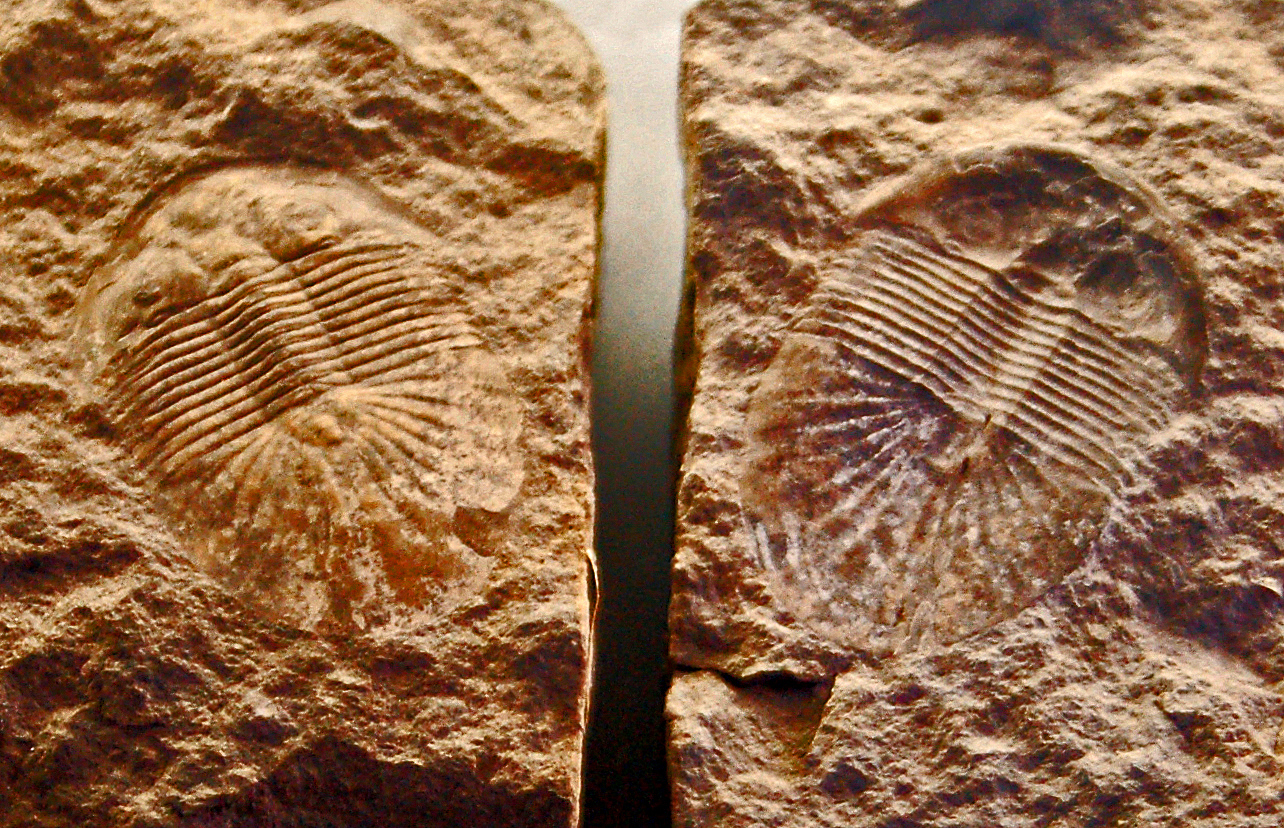
- Planiscutellum planum from Loděnice (Beroun District), Czech Republic at the National Museum (Prague)

Scientific classification
- Kingdom: Animalia
- Phylum: Arthropoda
- Clade: †Artiopoda
- Class: †Trilobita
- Order: †Corynexochida
- Family: †Styginidae
- Genus: †Planiscutellum; Richter, 1956

Synonyms
- Protoscutellum Snajdr, 1960

= Planiscutellum =

Planiscutellum Temporal range: Silurian

Genus of trilobites

Planiscutellum is a genus of trilobites in the order Corynexochida family Styginidae. These trilobites were nektobenthic detritivore. They lived in the Silurian period in the upper Ludlow epoch, from 422.9 ± 1.5 to 418.7 ± 2.8 million years ago.

== Distribution ==
Silurian of Canada (Quebec, Yukon), the Czech Republic, the United Kingdom; Ordovician to Silurian of Canada (Québec)
