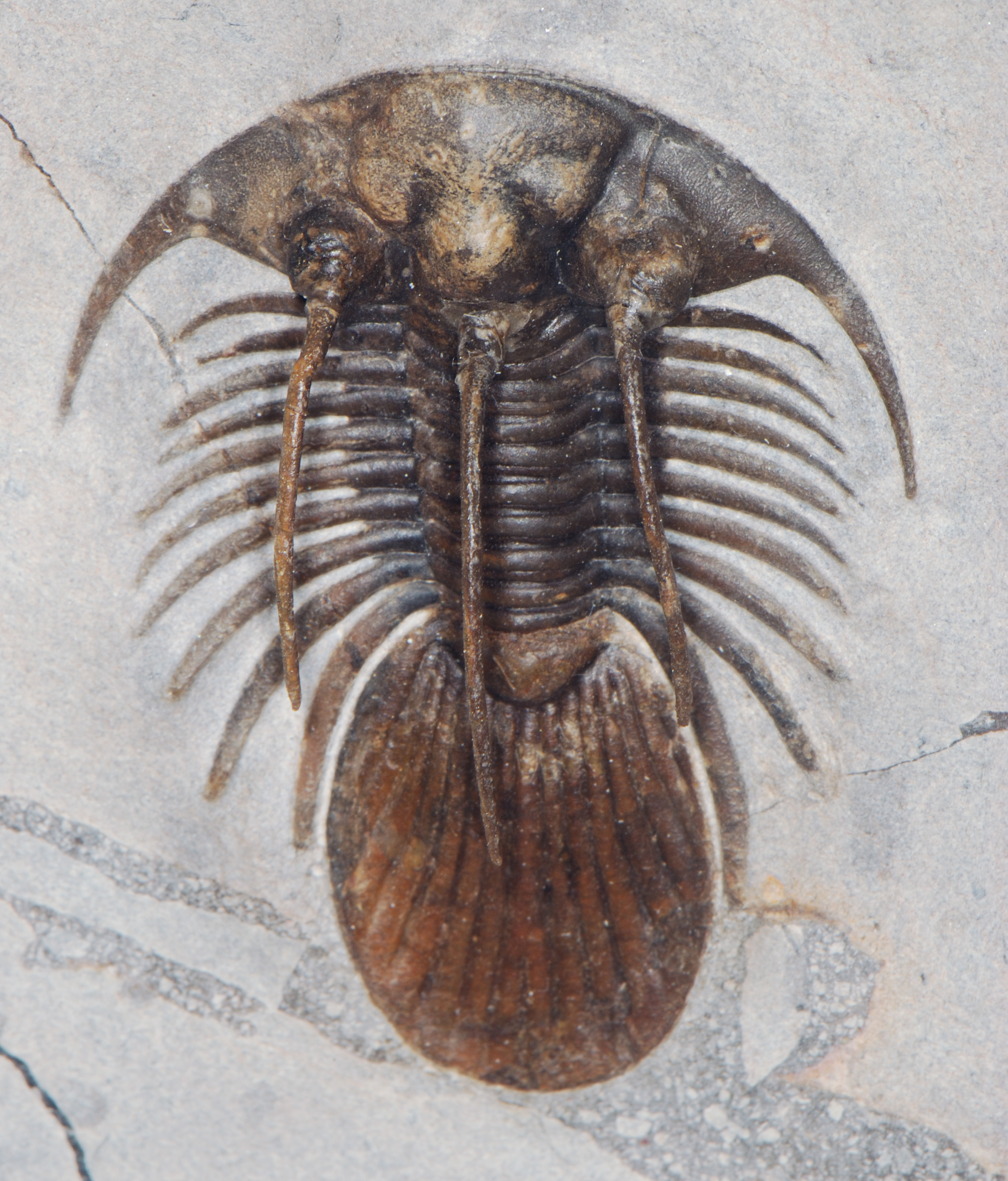

Scientific classification
- Domain: Eukaryota
- Kingdom: Animalia
- Phylum: Arthropoda
- Class: †Trilobita
- Order: †Corynexochida
- Family: †Styginidae
- Genus: †Kolihapeltis; Prantl & Pribyl, 1947

= Kolihapeltis =

Kolihapeltis Temporal range: Early Devonian–Middle Devonian

Extinct genus of trilobites

Kolihapeltis is a genus of trilobite that lived from the Early Devonian to the Middle Devonian. Its remains have been found in Africa and Europe.
