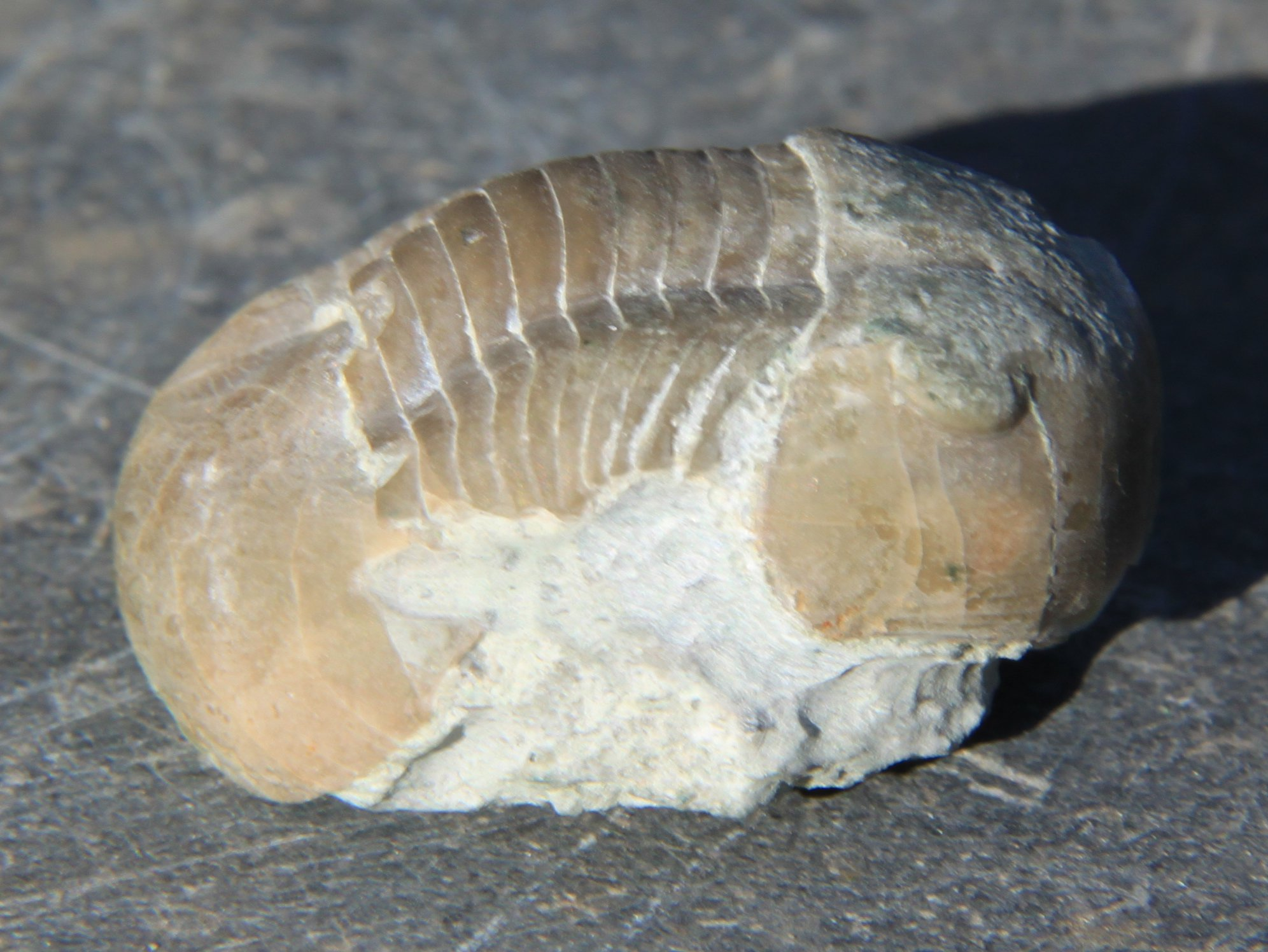
- Illaenus sarsi from Sweden

Scientific classification
- Kingdom: Animalia
- Phylum: Arthropoda
- Clade: †Artiopoda
- Class: †Trilobita
- Order: †Corynexochida
- Family: †Illaenidae
- Genus: †Illaenus; Dalman, 1827

= Illaenus =

Illaenus Temporal range: Middle Ordovician

Genus of trilobites

Illaenus is a genus of trilobites from Russia and Morocco, from the middle Ordovician.

Species included in this genus can reach a length of about 57 millimetres (2.2 in). They are without glabella and without articulation of the tail. The cephalon has a high profile and recurved genal spines. Eyes are distant from the axis of the head, situated nearer to the edge.

== Selected species ==
This genus includes about 50 species:

- †Illaenus alveatus Raymond 1925
- †Illaenus auriculatus Ross Jr. & Barnes 1967
- †Illaenus bayfieldi Billings 1859
- †Illaenus bucculentus Whittington 1963
- †Illaenus consimilis Billings 1865
- †Illaenus consobrinus Billings 1865
- †Illaenus crassicauda Wahlenberg 1826
- †Illaenus fraternus Billings 1865
- †Illaenus gelasinus Whittington 1965
- †Illaenus lacertus Whittington 1954
- †Illaenus marginalis Raymond 1925
- †Illaenus oscitatus Fortey 1980
- †Illaenus slancyensis Krylov 2016
- †Illaenus spiculatus Whittington 1963
- †Illaenus tauricornis Kutorga 1848
- †Illaenus tumidifrons Billings 1865
- †Illaenus utahensis Hintze 1952
- †Illaenus welchi Loch & Ethington 2017

== See also ==
- Ordovician fauna of Putilovo village
