= Raymondaspis =

Scientific classification
- Domain: Eukaryota
- Kingdom: Animalia
- Phylum: Arthropoda
- Class: †Trilobita
- Order: †Corynexochida
- Family: †Styginidae
- Genus: †Raymondaspis; Pribyl, 1949

Extinct genus of trilobites

Raymondaspis is a genus of trilobites in the family Styginidae. It was described by Pribyl in 1949, and contains the species R. reticulatus and R. turgidus from the Whiterockian of Canada, R. vespertina from the Ordovician and Whiterockian of the United States and Norway, and a new species, R. grandigena, which existed during the Middle Ordovician of what is now Sweden. R. grandigena was described in 2012 by Martin Stein and Jan Bergström.
