= List of the prehistoric life of Vermont =

This list of the prehistoric life of Vermont contains the various prehistoric life-forms whose fossilized remains have been reported from within the US state of Vermont.

== Precambrian ==
The Paleobiology Database records no known occurrences of Precambrian fossils in Vermont.

== Paleozoic ==
- †Acheilops
- †Acidiphorus
  - †Acidiphorus whittingtoni
- †Albiconus
  - †Albiconus antiquus
- †Alokistocarella
- †Ambonychiopsis
  - †Ambonychiopsis curvata
- †Amphilichas
  - †Amphilichas minganensis
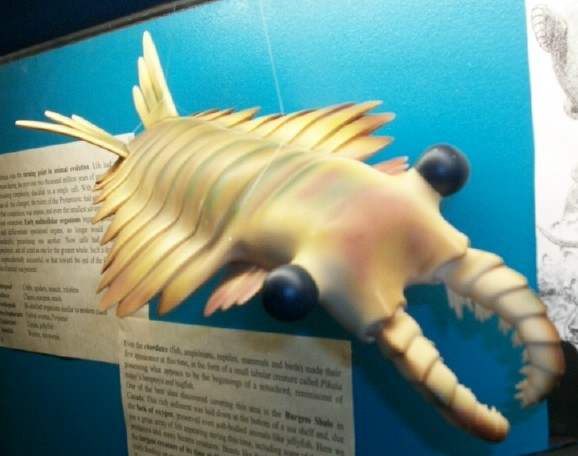
- Restorative model of the Cambrian arthropod Anomalocaris
  †Anomalocaris – tentative report
  - †Anomalocaris emmonsi
- †Antagmus
  - †Antagmus typicalis
- †Anthaspidella
- †Apheoorthis
- †Apianurus
  - †Apianurus narrawayi
- †Archaeorthis
- †Archinacella
  - †Archinacella pileolum – type locality for species
- †Baltoceras
  - †Baltoceras minor
- †Basilicus
  - †Basilicus whittingtoni
- †Bassleroceras
  - †Bassleroceras acinacellum
  - †Bassleroceras kirbyi – type locality for species
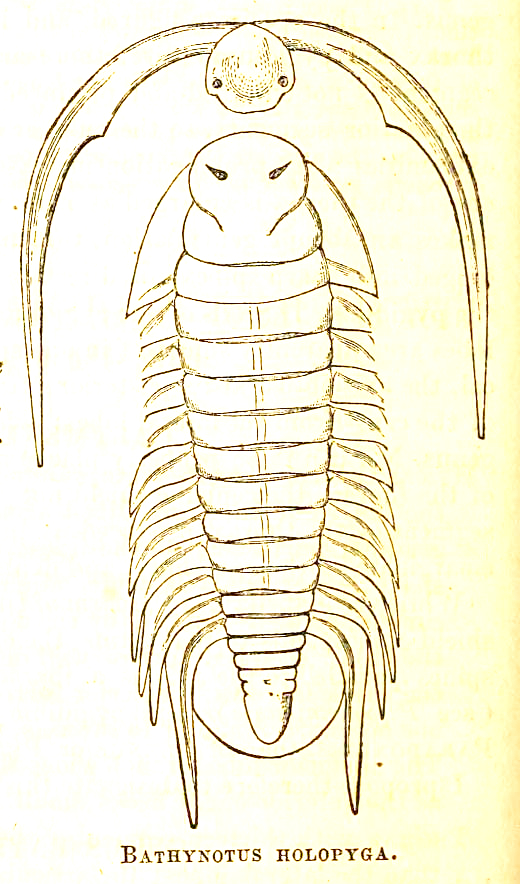
- Illustration of a fossil of the Cambrian trilobite Bathynotus
  †Bathynotus
  - †Bathynotus holopygus
- †Batostoma
  - †Batostoma campensis
  - †Batostoma chaziensis
  - †Batostoma chazyensis
  - †Batostoma lanensis
- †Bellaspis
  - †Bellaspis longifrons – type locality for species
- †Bigranulella
  - †Bigranulella latigenae – type locality for species
- †Billingaspis
- †Billingsaria
  - †Billingsaria parva
- †Billingsaspis
  - †Billingsaspis adamsii
- †Bolaspidella
  - †Bolaspidella convexa
- †Bonnia
  - †Bonnia bubaris
  - †Bonnia capito
- †Bovicornellum
  - †Bovicornellum vermontense
- †Bowmania
  - †Bowmania americana
- †Bridgeites
  - †Bridgeites volutatus – type locality for species
- †Brunswickia
  - †Brunswickia quadrata
- †Bucanella
  - †Bucanella tripla – type locality for species
- †Bucania
  - †Bucania sulcatina
- †Bumastoides
  - †Bumastoides aplatus
  - †Bumastoides gardenensis
- †Bynumia
- †Calaurops – type locality for genus
  - †Calaurops lituiformis – type locality for species
- †Calyptaulax
  - †Calyptaulax annulata
- †Cambrooistodus
  - †Cambrooistodus cambricus
  - †Cambrooistodus minutus
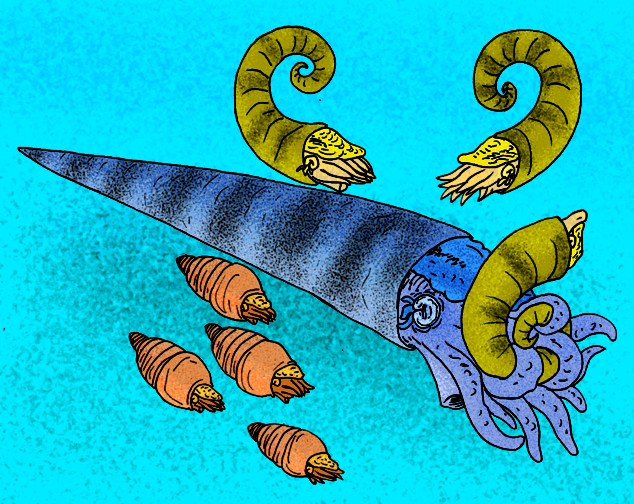
- Restoration of the Middle Ordovician-Silurian nautiloid cephalopod Cameroceras feeding on an Aphetoceras, while a quartet of Cyclostomiceras swim by
  †Cameroceras
  - †Cameroceras curvatum
- †Campbelloceras
  - †Campbelloceras hyatti
  - †Campbelloceras virginianus
- †Cassinoceras
  - †Cassinoceras explanator
  - †Cassinoceras grande
- †Catillicephala
  - †Catillicephala lata
  - †Catillicephala ovoides
  - †Catillicephala rotunda
- †Centropleura
- †Centrotarphyceras
  - †Centrotarphyceras seelyi
  - †Centrotarphyceras subundosum
- †Ceramoporella
- †Ceratopea
  - †Ceratopea canadensis – type locality for species
  - †Ceratopea compressum – type locality for species
- †Ceraurinella
  - †Ceraurinella latipyga
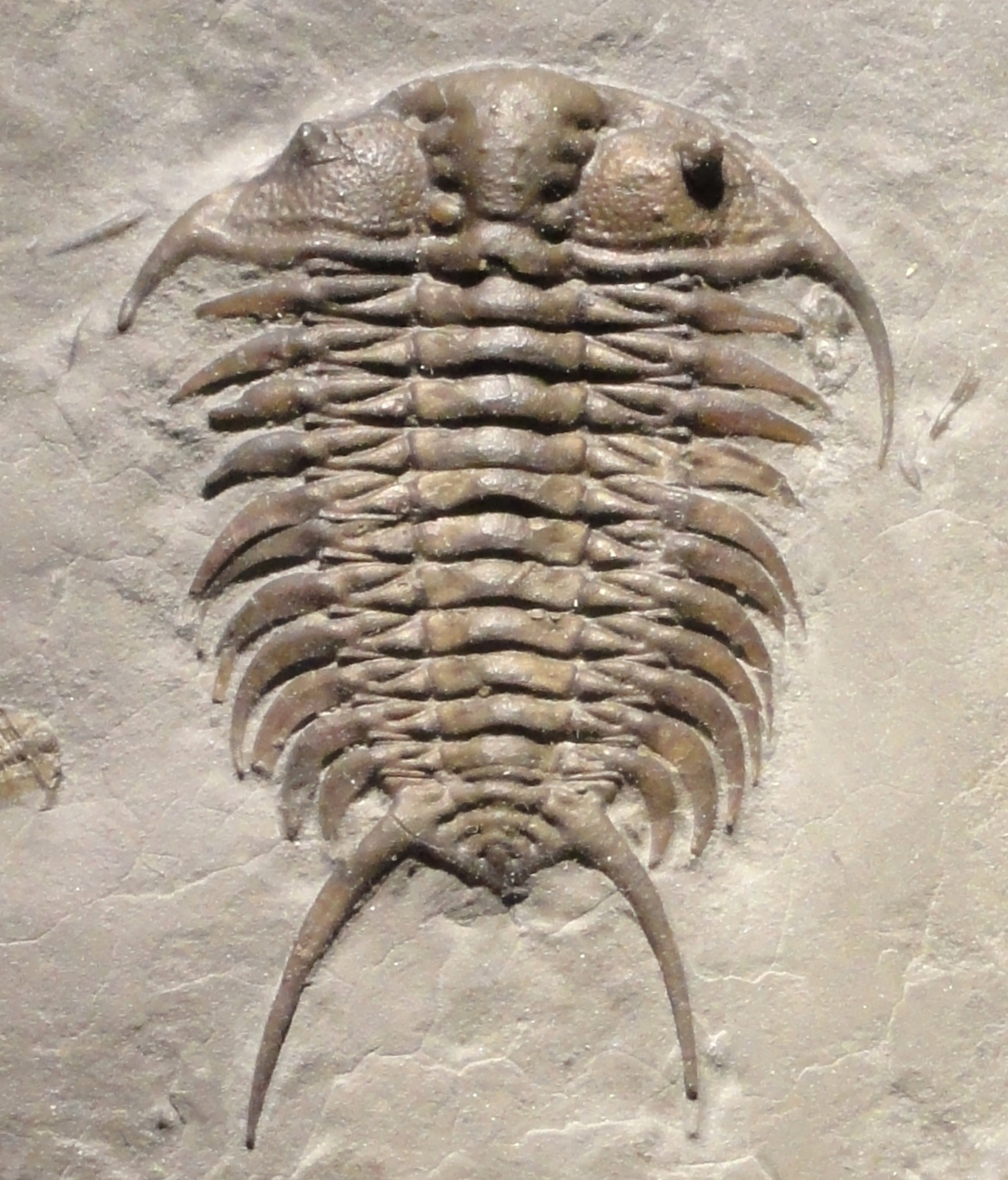
- Fossil of the Middle-Late Ordovician trilobite Ceraurus
  †Ceraurus
- †Champlainopora
  - †Champlainopora chazyensis
- †Chancia
  - †Chancia rasettii – type locality for species
- †Chazydictya
  - †Chazydictya chazyensis
- †Clisospira
  - †Clisospira bassleri – type locality for species
- †Coelocerodontus
  - †Coelocerodontus cambricus
  - †Coelocerodontus latus
  - †Coelocerodontus variabilis
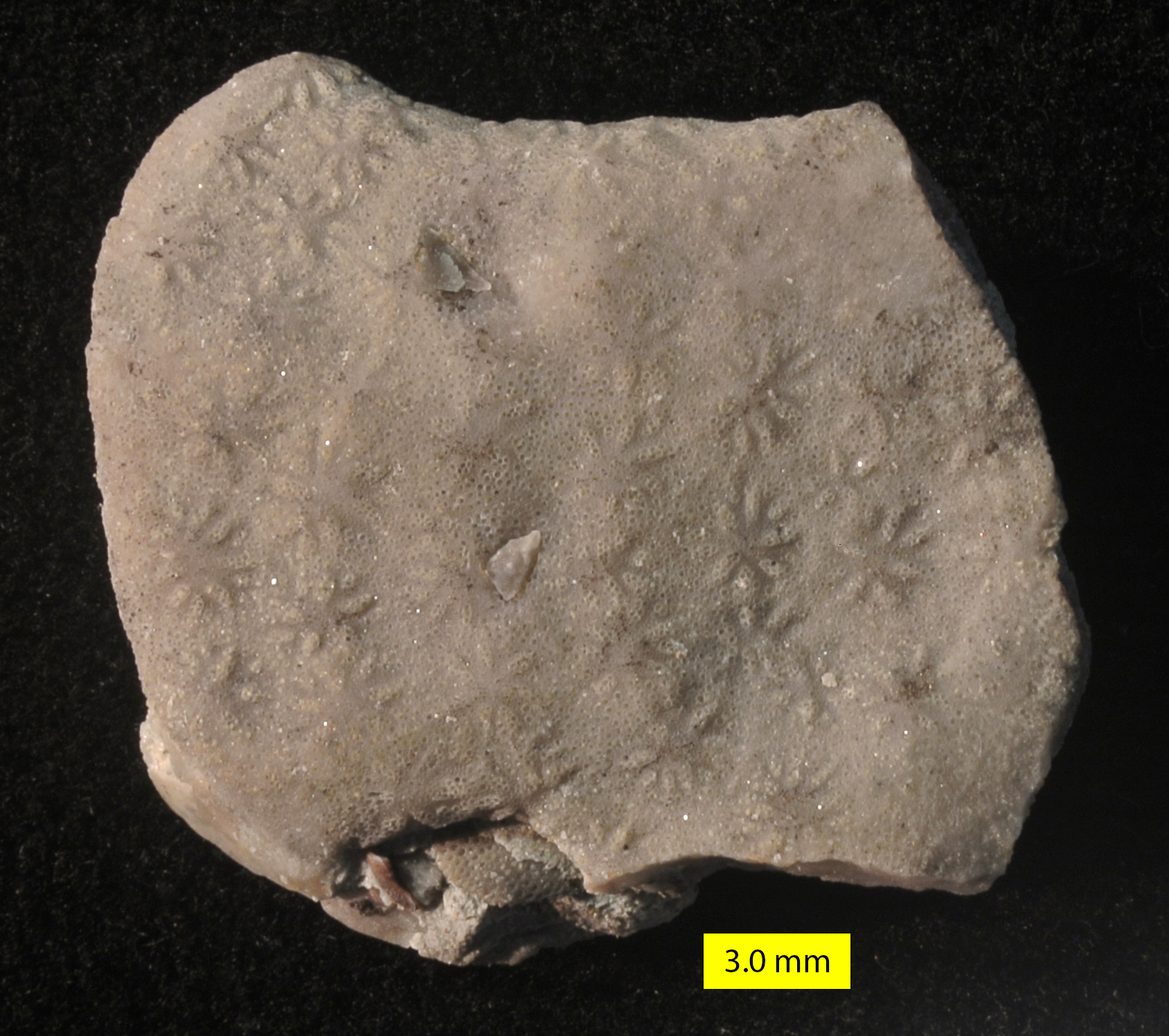
- Fossil of the Ordovician bryozoan Constellaria
  †Constellaria
  - †Constellaria islensis
- †Cordylodus
  - †Cordylodus proavus
- †Coreospira – tentative report
  - †Coreospira raymondi – type locality for species
- †Curtoceras
  - †Curtoceras eatoni
- †Cyclostomiceras
  - †Cyclostomiceras cassinense
  - †Cyclostomiceras minimum
- †Cyptendoceras
  - †Cyptendoceras ruedemanni
- †Cyrtactinoceras
  - †Cyrtactinoceras boycii
- †Cyrtobaltoceras
  - †Cyrtobaltoceras gracile
- †Dactylagonia
  - †Dactylagonia incrasata
- †Dactylogonia
  - †Dactylogonia incrassata
- †Dictyonema
- †Dimeropyge
  - †Dimeropyge clintonensis
- †Diraphora – tentative report
- †Dunderbergia
  - †Dunderbergia directifrons – type locality for species
- †Ecculiomphalus
  - †Ecculiomphalus calciferus – type locality for species
  - †Ecculiomphalus priscus – type locality for species
- †Elrathia
- †Emmonsaspis
  - †Emmonsaspis cambriensis
- †Endoceras
  - †Endoceras primigenium
- †Eobronteus
- †Eoconodontus
  - †Eoconodontus alisonae
  - †Eoconodontus notchpeakensis
  - †Eoconodontus notchperkensis
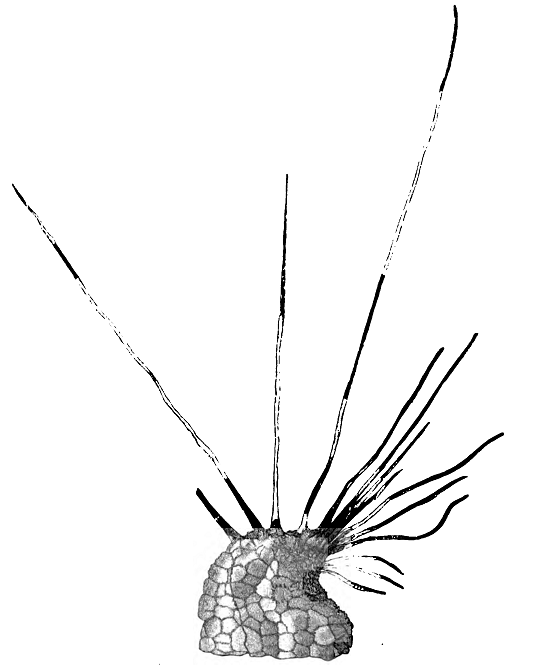
- Life restoration of the Cambrian echinoderm relative Eocystites
  †Eocystites
- †Eopachydictya
  - †Eopachydictya gregaria
- †Eopteria
  - †Eopteria ventricosa – type locality for species
- †Eridotrypa
  - †Eridotrypa exigua
- †Eroicaspira – tentative report
  - †Eroicaspira obelisca – type locality for species
- †Esmeraldina
  - †Esmeraldina hermani
- †Euconia
  - †Euconia etna – type locality for species
- †Eurekia
- †Eurystomites
  - †Eurystomites kelloggi
- †Exigua
  - †Exigua quadrata
- †Failleana
  - †Failleana limbata
- †Finkelnburgia
  - †Finkelnburgia macleodi – type locality for species
- †Foerstephyllum
  - †Foerstephyllum wissleri
- †Furnishina
  - †Furnishina furnishi
  - †Furnishina primitiva
- †Fusispira
  - †Fusispira obesus – type locality for species
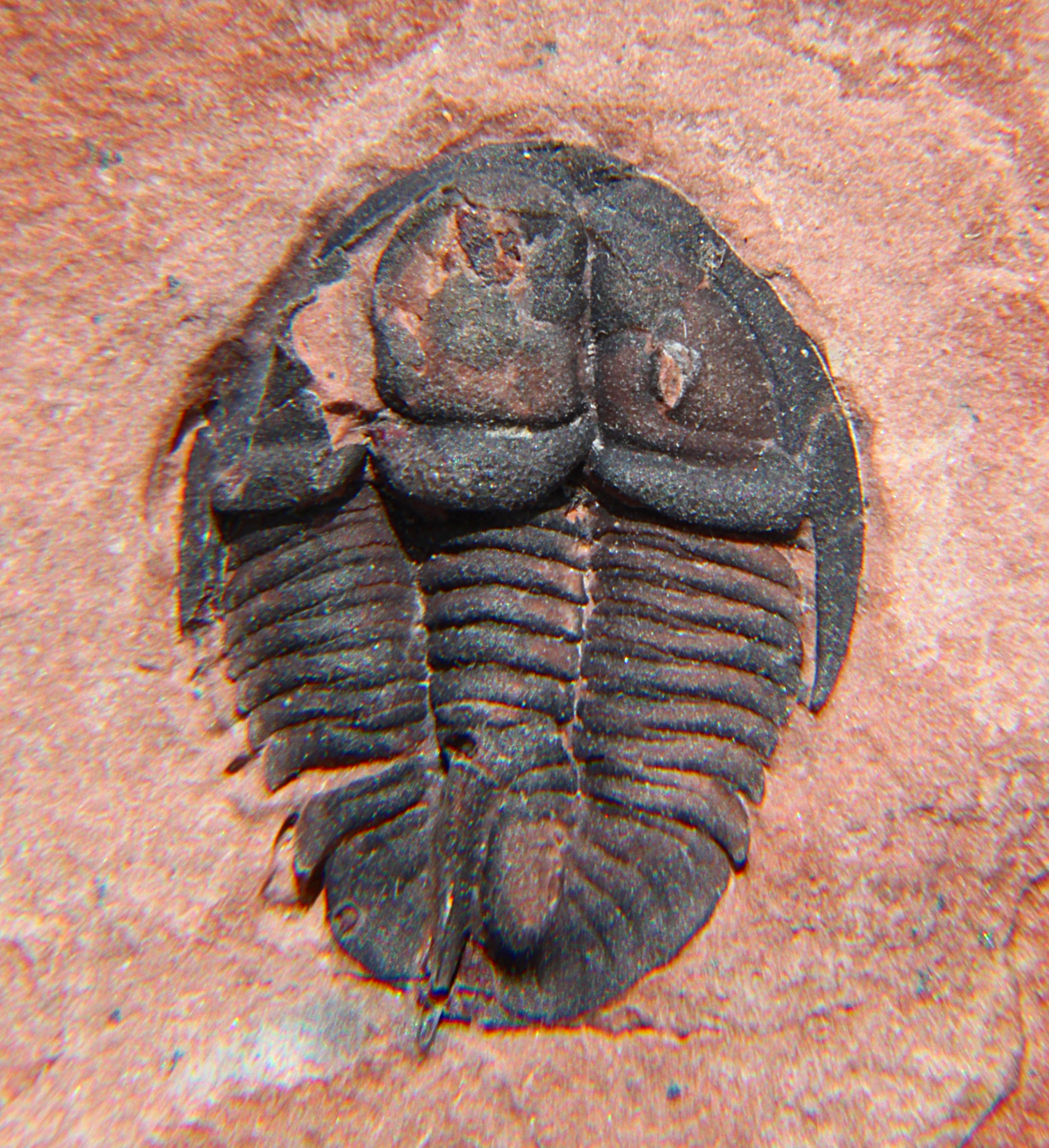
- Fossil of the Cambrian trilobite Genevievella
  †Genevievella
- †Geragnostus
- †Glaphurina
  - †Glaphurina lamottensis
- †Glaphurus
  - †Glaphurus pustulatus
- †Glyptometopsis
  - †Glyptometopsis tumida
- †Glyptotrophia
- †Gonioceras
  - †Gonioceras chaziense
- †Grandagnostus
- †Grinnellaspis
  - †Grinnellaspis marginiata – or unidentified comparable form
- †Hardyoides
- †Hastagnostus
- †Helcionella
  - †Helcionella A – informal
- †Heliomeroides
  - †Heliomeroides teres
- †Helopora
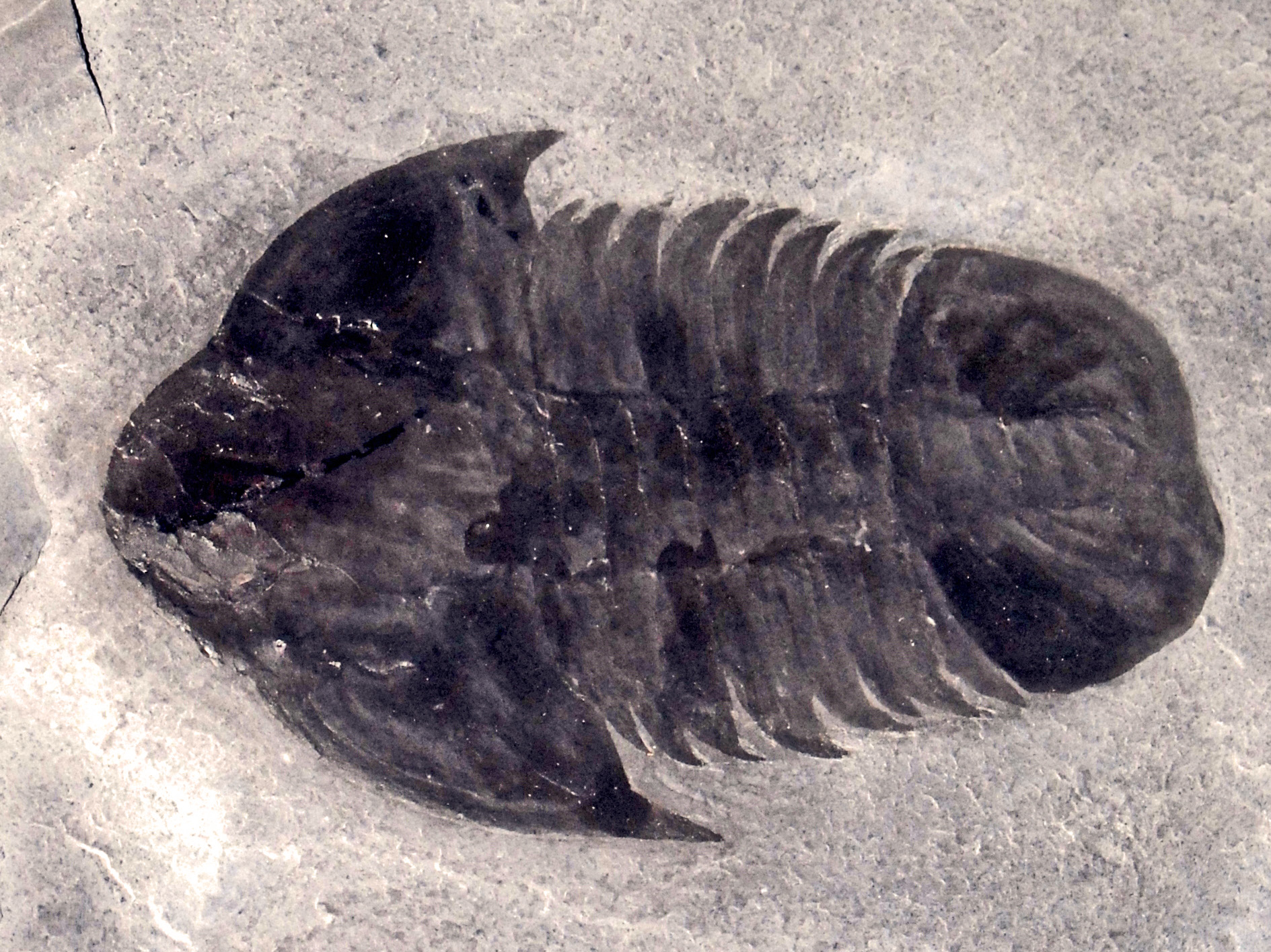
- Fossil of the Cambrian trilobite Hemirhodon
  †Hemirhodon
  - †Hemirhodon schucherti
- †Heterocaryon
  - †Heterocaryon platystigma
- †Heteronema
- †Hibbertia
  - †Hibbertia valcourensis
- †Highgatella
- †Hirsutodontus
  - †Hirsutodontus hirsutus
  - †Hirsutodontus rarus
- †Homagnostus
- †Hormotoma
  - †Hormotoma confusa – type locality for species
  - †Hormotoma gracilens – type locality for species
  - †Hormotoma prava – type locality for species
- †Huenella
  - †Huenella billingsi
- †Hyboaspis
  - †Hyboaspis depressa

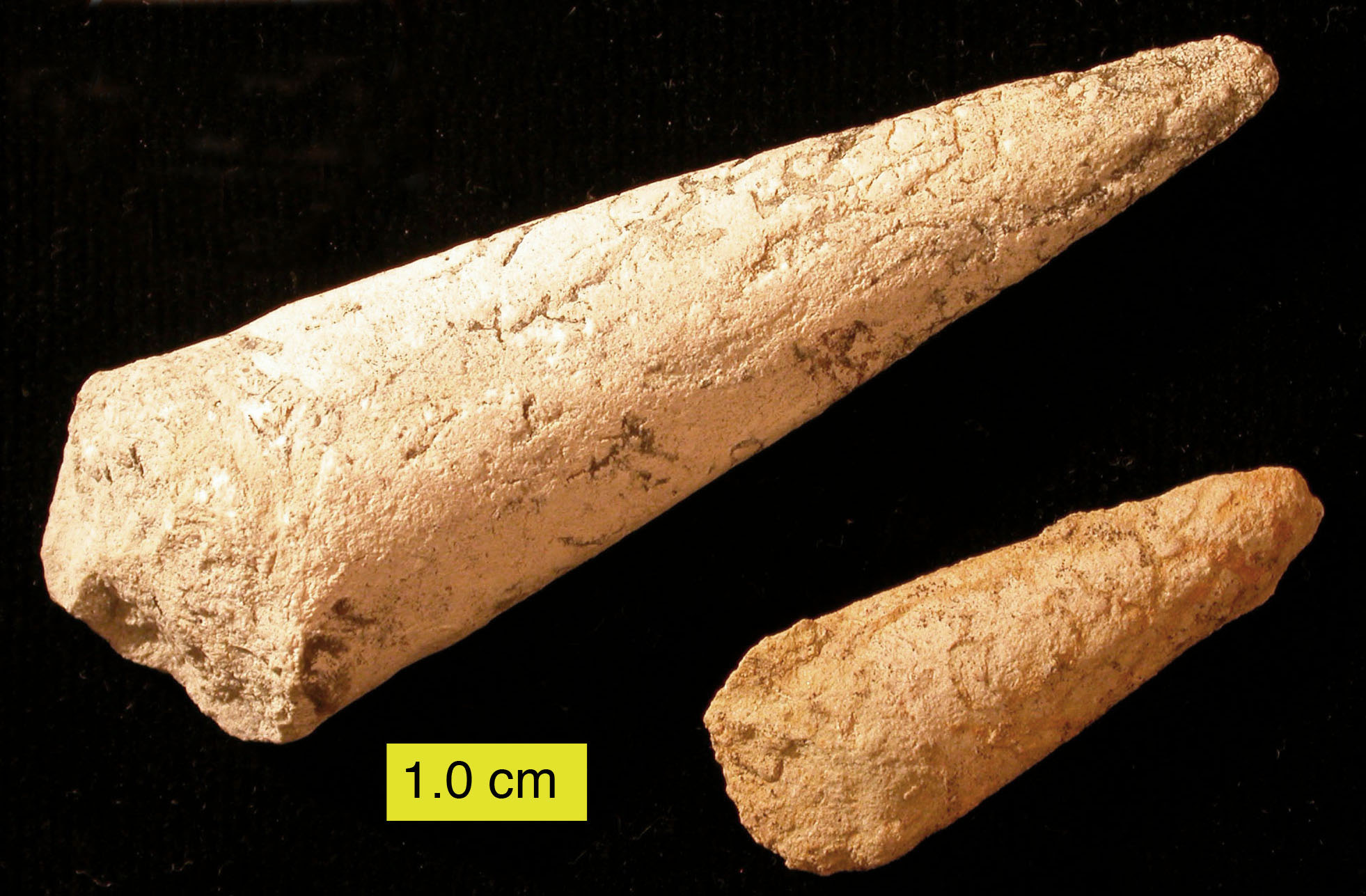
Fossilized shells of the Cambrian-Permian brachiopod relative Hyolitha

†Hyolithes

  - †Hyolithes americanus
- †Hypagnostus
- †Hypseloconus
  - †Hypseloconus A – informal
- †Hysteropleura
  - †Hysteropleura macgerriglei
  - †Hysteropleura schucherti
- †Hystricurus
  - †Hystricurus conicus
- †Idiomesus
  - †Idiomesus tantillus
- †Insolitotheca
  - †Insolitotheca communis
- †Isoteloides
  - †Isoteloides canalis
  - †Isoteloides peri
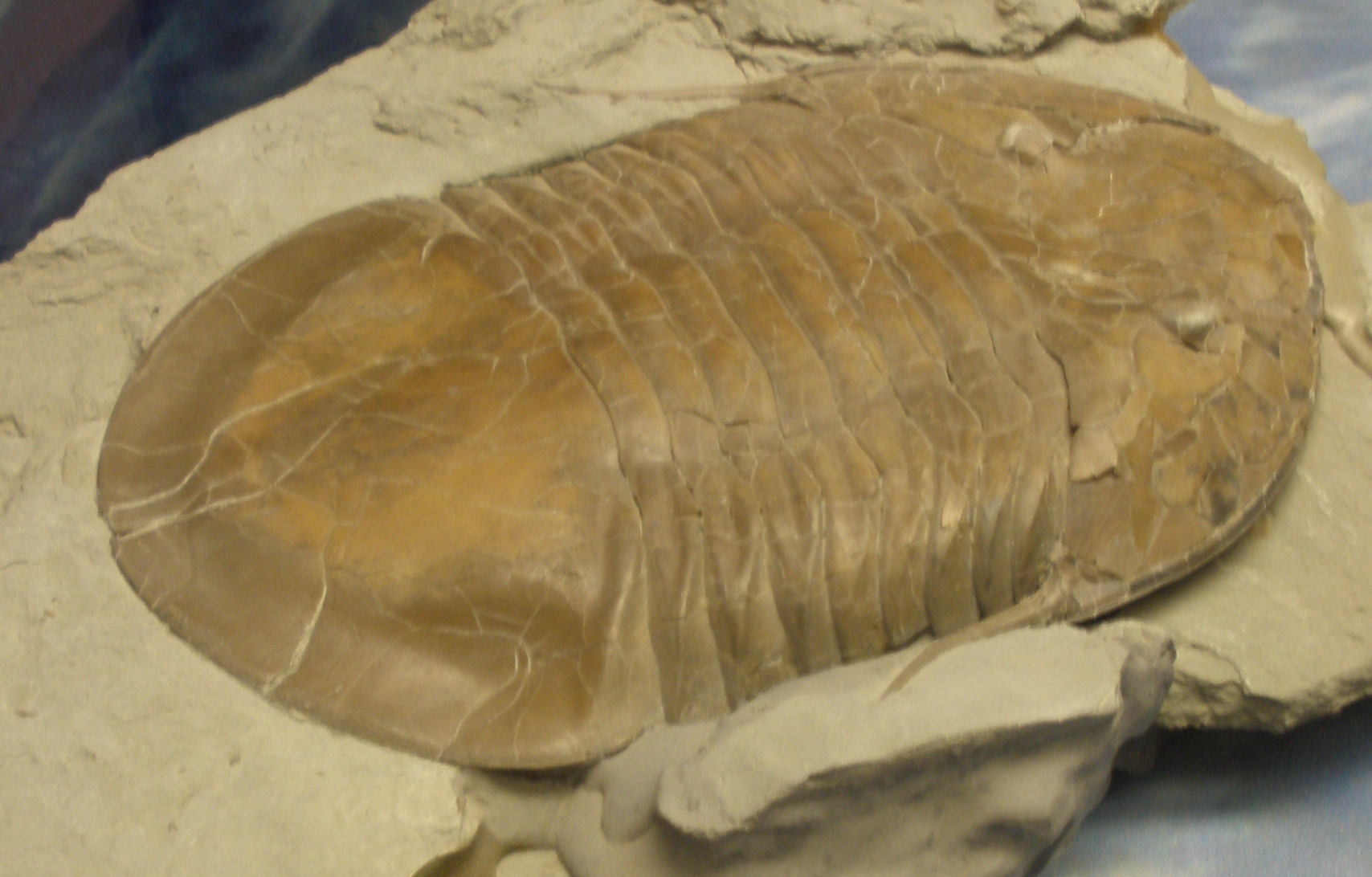
- Fossil of the Middle-Late Ordovician giant trilobite Isotelus.
  †Isotelus
  - †Isotelus harrisi
- †Jordanopora
  - †Jordanopora heroensis
- †Kawina – tentative report
  - †Kawina chazyensis
- †Keithia
  - †Keithia schucherti
- †Keithiella – tentative report
  - †Keithiella raymondi
- †Kirengella
  - †Kirengella alta – type locality for species
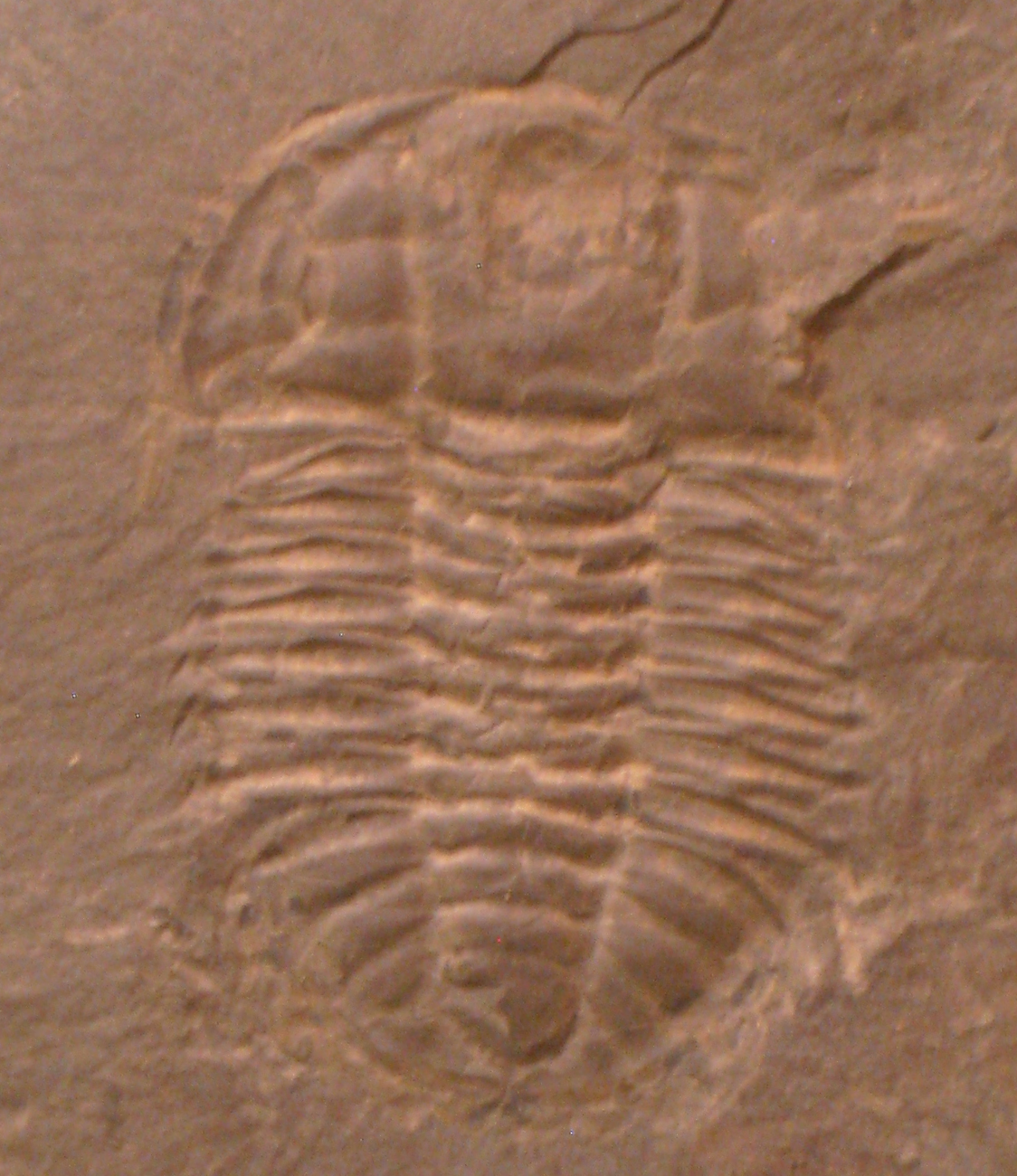
- Fossil of the Cambrian trilobite Kootenia
  †Kootenia
  - †Kootenia boucheri – type locality for species
  - †Kootenia marcoui
- †Kutorgina
  - †Kutorgina cingulata
- †Labechia
  - †Labechia eatoni
  - †Labechia prima
  - †Labechia pustulosa – or unidentified comparable form
  - †Labechia valcourensis
- †Laiwugnathus
  - †Laiwugnathus laiwuensis
- †Lambeophyllum
  - †Lambeophyllum profundum
- †Lamottia
  - †Lamottia heroensis
- †Lamottoceras
  - †Lamottoceras nodosum
  - †Lamottoceras ruedemanni
- †Lamottopora
  - †Lamottopora duncanae
- †Lawrenceoceras
  - †Lawrenceoceras breve
  - †Lawrenceoceras confertissimum
- †Lecanospira
  - †Lecanospira compacta
- †Leiocoryphe
  - †Leiocoryphe brevis
- †Leptomitus
  - †Leptomitus zitteli
- †Lichenaria
  - †Lichenaria heroensis
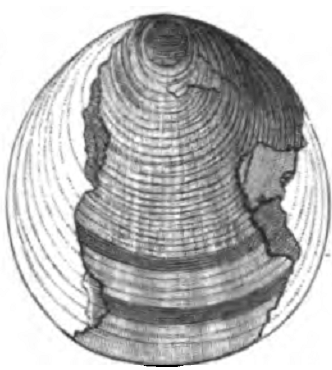
- Illustration of a fossilized shell of the Cambrian-Late Ordovician brachiopod Lingulella
  †Lingulella
  - †Lingulella brainerdi
  - †Lingulella columba
  - †Lingulella franklinensis
  - †Lingulella quadrilateralis
  - †Lingulella stonei
- †Lingulepis
  - †Lingulepis vermontensis
- †Linnarssonia
- †Litagnostus
- †Lonchodomas
  - †Lonchodomas halli
- †Lophonema
  - †Lophonema circumlirata – type locality for species
- †Lophospira
  - †Lophospira calcifera – type locality for species
  - †Lophospira milleri – type locality for species
  - †Lophospira rectistriata
- †Lotagnostus
  - †Lotagnostus hedini
  - †Lotagnostus heidini
- †Maclurites
  - †Maclurites magnus
- †Macrocoelia
  - †Macrocoelia champlainensis
- †Malayaspira
  - †Malayaspira perkinsi – type locality for species
- †Matherella
  - †Matherella lirata – type locality for species
- †Meneviella
- †Mesnaquaceras
  - †Mesnaquaceras curviseptatum
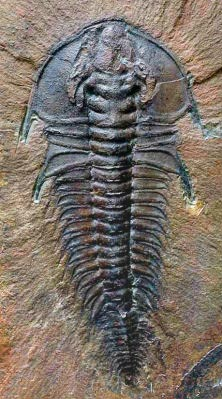
- Fossil of the Cambrian trilobite Mesonacis
  †Mesonacis
  - †Mesonacis vermontanus
- †Mexicella
  - †Mexicella stator
- †Missisquoia
- †Modocia
  - †Modocia vermontensis
- †Murrayoceras
  - †Murrayoceras primum
- †Nanno
- †Nicholsonella
- †Nileoides
  - †Nileoides perkinsi
- †Nisusia
  - †Nisusia cloudi – type locality for species
  - †Nisusia festinata
  - †Nisusia howelli – type locality for species
  - †Nisusia transversa
- †Nybyoceras
  - †Nybyoceras cryptum
- †Nyctopora
  - †Nyctopora vantuyli
- †Olenaspella
  - †Olenaspella angularis
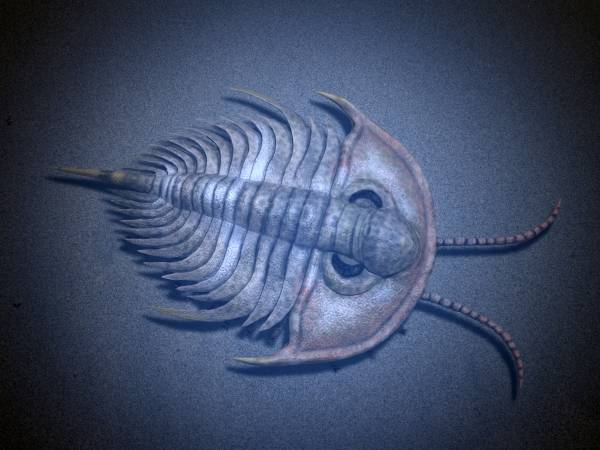
- Restoration of the Cambrian trilobite Olenellus
  †Olenellus
  - †Olenellus brachycephalus
  - †Olenellus thompsoni
- †Oligometopus
  - †Oligometopus vermontensis – type locality for species
- †Onchonotopsis
- †Oneotodus
  - †Oneotodus erectus
- †Oonoceras
  - †Oonoceras lativentrum
  - †Oonoceras perkinsi
- †Orthambonites
  - †Orthambonites exfoliata
  - †Orthambonites exfoliatus
- †Orthidium
  - †Orthidium lamellosum
- †Orthis
- †Orthoceras
  - †Orthoceras modestum
  - †Orthoceras vagum
- †Orthotheca
  - †Orthotheca acicula
- †Pachydictya
  - †Pachydictya sheldonensis
- †Pachystylostroma
  - †Pachystylostroma champlainense
  - †Pachystylostroma goodsellense – type locality for species
  - †Pachystylostroma pollicellum – type locality for species
  - †Pachystylostroma vallum – type locality for species
- †Pagetides
  - †Pagetides parkeri
- †Palliseria
  - †Palliseria acuminata
- †Parabolinella
- †Paraplethopeltis
  - †Paraplethopeltis seelyi – type locality for species
- †Paterina
  - †Paterina labradorica
- †Peracheilus
  - †Peracheilus laevis
- †Periomma
- †Peruniscus
  - †Peruniscus cassinensis – type locality for species
- †Petrocrania
  - †Petrocrania prona
- †Phakelodus
  - †Phakelodus tenuis
- †Phoreotropis
  - †Phoreotropis puteatus
- †Phorocephala
  - †Phorocephala setoni
- †Phylacterus
  - †Phylacterus saylesi
- †Phylloporina
- †Physemataspis
  - †Physemataspis insularis
- †Pionoceras
  - †Pionoceras vokesi
- †Platillaenus
  - †Platillaenus erastusi
- †Platydiamesus
  - †Platydiamesus inornatus
- †Plethopeltis
- †Plethospira
  - †Plethospira cassina – type locality for species
  - †Plethospira difficilis – type locality for species
- †Plicatolina
- †Pliomerops
  - †Pliomerops canadensis
- †Pojetaconcha
  - †Pojetaconcha beecheri – type locality for species
- †Problematoconites
  - †Problematoconites perforata
- †Proconodontus
  - †Proconodontus muelleri
  - †Proconodontus serratus
- †Proconodonuts
  - †Proconodonuts serratus
- †Prooneotodus
  - †Prooneotodus gallatini
  - †Prooneotodus rotundatus
- †Proplina
  - †Proplina acutum
- †Prosagittodontus
  - †Prosagittodontus dahlmani
- †Prosaukia
  - †Prosaukia irrassa
- †Proteoceras
  - †Proteoceras perkinsi
  - †Proteoceras pulchrum
- †Proterocameroceras
  - †Proterocameroceras brainerdi
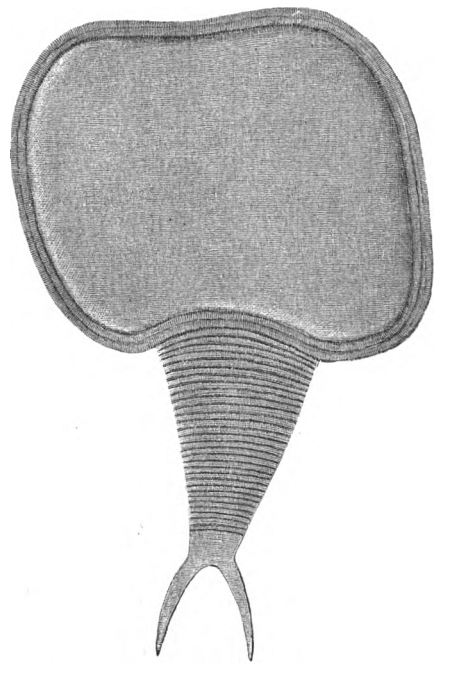
- Illustration of a fossil of the Cambrian crustacean Protocaris
  †Protocaris
  - †Protocaris marshi
- †Protoconchioides
  - †Protoconchioides varians
- †Protocycloceras
  - †Protocycloceras geronticum
  - †Protocycloceras lamarcki
- †Protorthis – tentative report
  - †Protorthis vermontensis
- †Protospongia
  - †Protospongia hicksi
- †Protypus
  - †Protypus hitchcocki
- †Prozacanthoides
- †Pseudagnostus
- †Pseudostylodictyon
  - †Pseudostylodictyon lamottense
- †Pterocephalops
  - †Pterocephalops tuberculineata – type locality for species
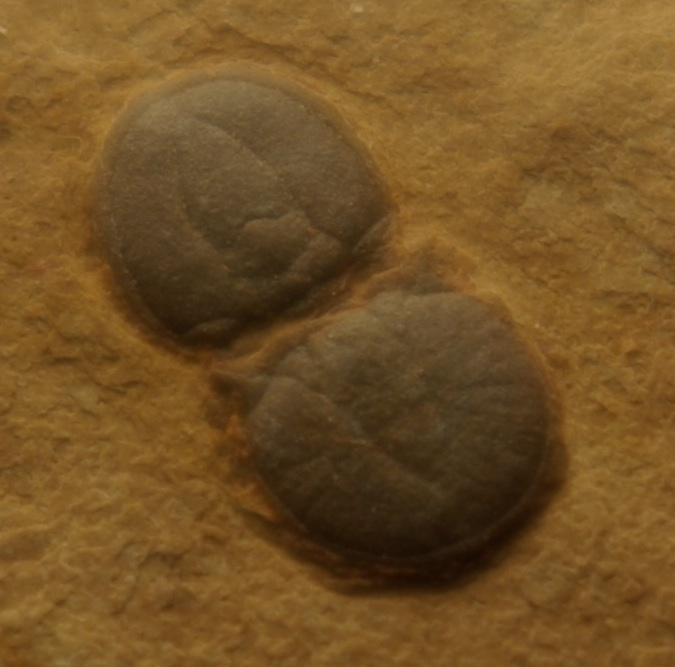
- Fossil of the Cambrian trilobite Ptychagnostus
  †Ptychagnostus
- †Ptychoparella
  - †Ptychoparella kindlei – or unidentified comparable form
- †Ptychopleurites
  - †Ptychopleurites quebecensis
- †Punctaspis
  - †Punctaspis crassimargo – type locality for species
- †Quadragnostus
- †Quebecaspis
  - †Quebecaspis hemiphaerica – type locality for species
  - †Quebecaspis marylandica
- †Raphistoma
  - †Raphistoma stamineum
- †Raphistomina
  - †Raphistomina hortensia
- †Remopleurides
  - †Remopleurides canadensis
- †Ribeiria
  - †Ribeiria compressa – type locality for species
- †Richardsonella
  - †Richardsonella arctostriata
- Rostricellula
  - †Rostricellula plena
  - †Rostricellula pristina
- †Rothpletzella
- †Rudolfoceras
  - †Rudolfoceras cornuoryx
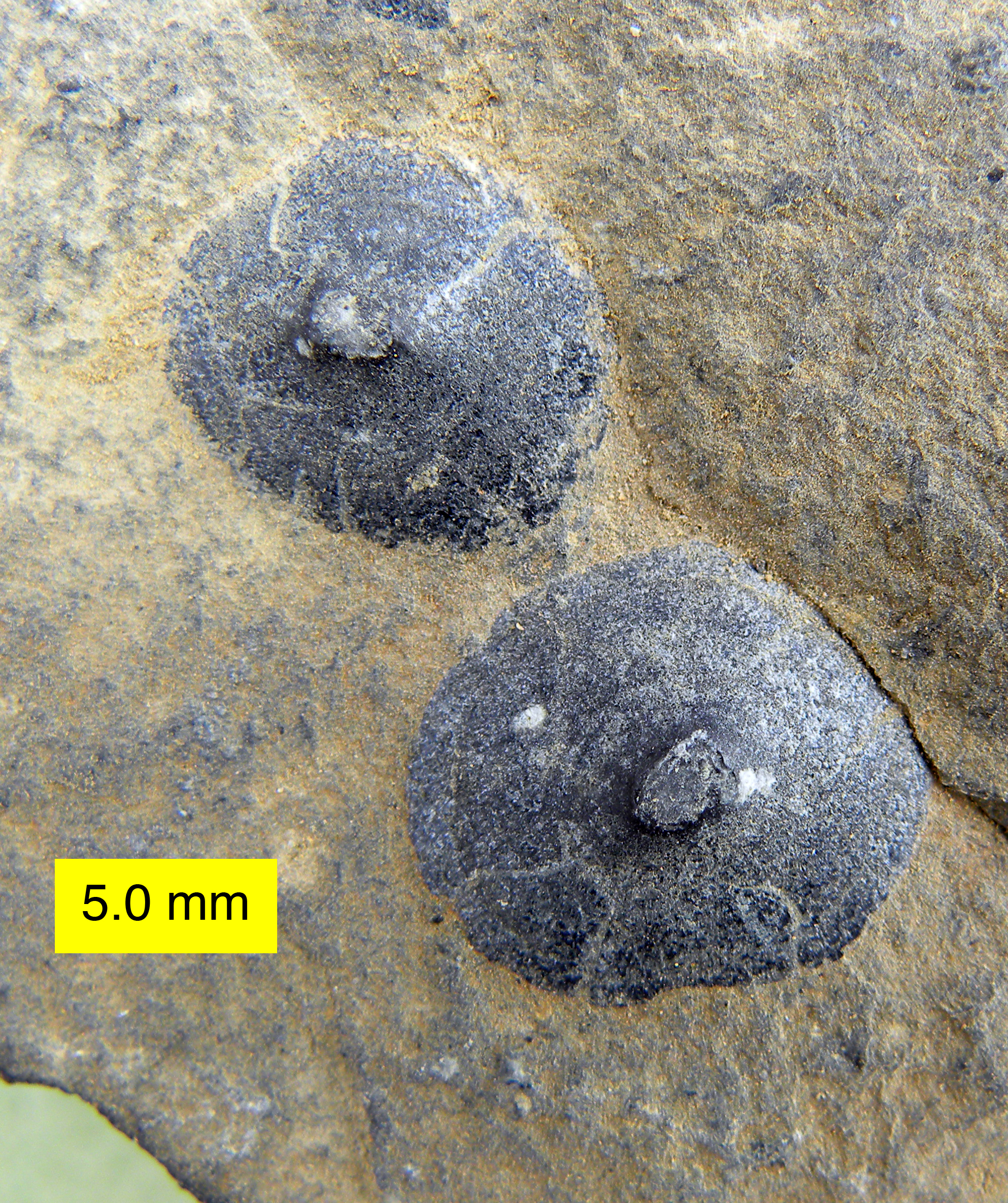
- Fossils of the Cambrian mollusc Scenella
  †Scenella
  - †Scenella conicum – type locality for species
- †Schizopea
- †Semiacontiodus
- †Serpulites
- †Solenopleura
  - †Solenopleura franklinensis
- †Solenopora
  - †Solenopora embrunensis
- †Sphaerexochus
  - †Sphaerexochus valcourensis
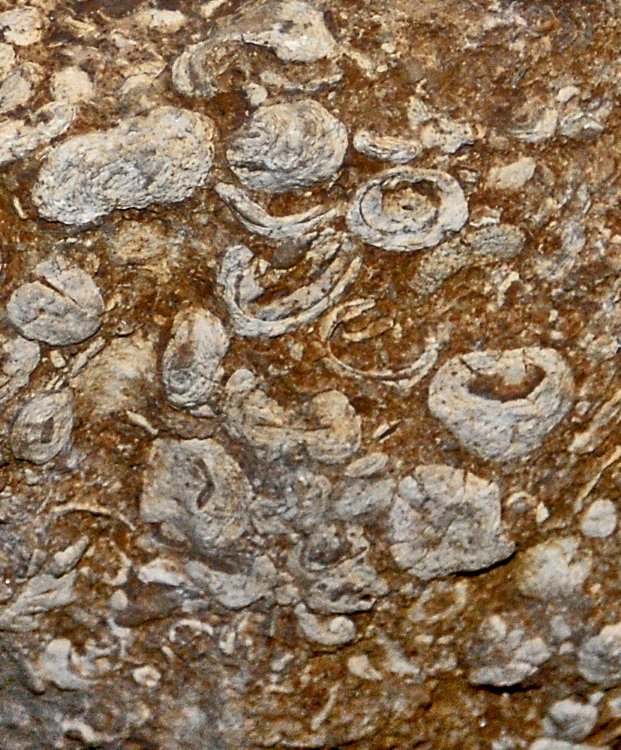
- Assemblage of fossils of the Ordovician-Triassic blue-green alga Sphaerocodium
  †Sphaerocodium
- †Sphaerocoryphe
  - †Sphaerocoryphe goodnovi
- †Sphenotreta
  - †Sphenotreta acutirostris
- †Stenelymus
  - †Stenelymus kobayashii
- †Stenopareia
  - †Stenopareia globosus
- †Stenopilus
  - †Stenopilus pronus
- †Stereospyroceras
  - †Stereospyroceras champlainense
  - †Stereospyroceras clintoni
- †Stictopora
  - †Stictopora fenestrata – or unidentified comparable form
- †Straparollina
  - †Straparollina cassina – type locality for species
  - †Straparollina turgida
- †Streptelasma
  - †Streptelasma expansum
- †Stromatocerium
- †Sublites
- †Swantonia – tentative report
- †Symphysurina
- †Syntrophina
- †Syspacephalus
  - †Syspacephalus cadyi – type locality for species
- †Taenicephalites
  - †Taenicephalites macrops
- †Tarphyceras
  - †Tarphyceras multicameratum
  - †Tarphyceras perkinsi
- †Tatonaspis
  - †Tatonaspis breviceps
- †Teridontus
  - †Teridontus nakamurai
- †Thaleops
  - †Thaleops longispina
  - †Thaleops raymondi
- †Theodenisia
  - †Theodenisia gibba
  - †Theodenisia macrops
- †Tholifrons
  - †Tholifrons vermontensis – type locality for species
- †Trigyra – type locality for genus
  - †Trigyra ulrichi – type locality for species
- †Trocholites
  - †Trocholites internestriatus
- †Trocholitoceras
  - †Trocholitoceras walcotti
- †Trochonema
  - †Trochonema exile – type locality for species
- †Tryblidium
  - †Tryblidium ovale – type locality for species
  - †Tryblidium ovatum – type locality for species
  - †Tryblidium simplex – type locality for species
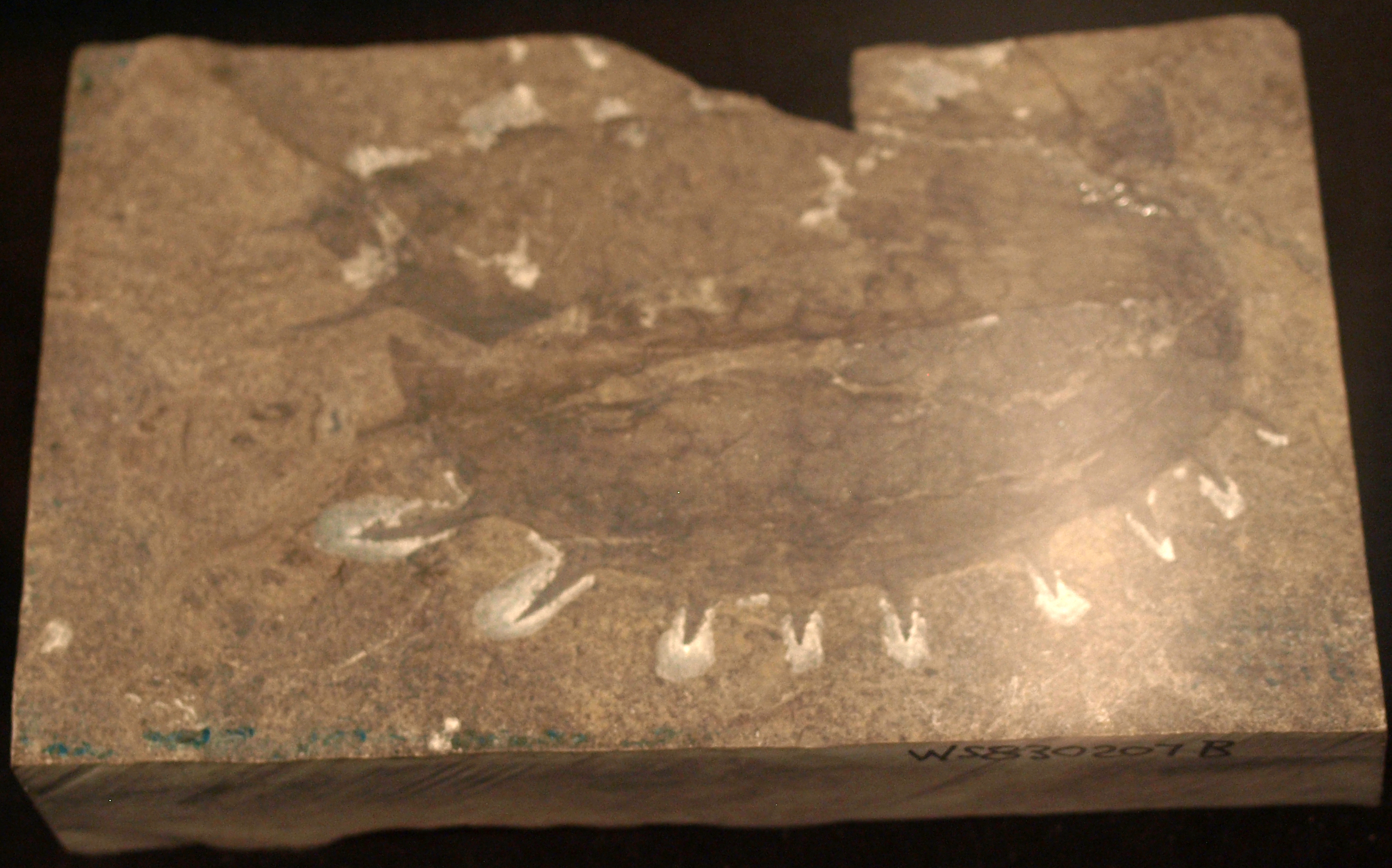
- Fossilized shell of the Cambrian arthropod Tuzoia
  †Tuzoia
- †Vaginoceras
  - †Vaginoceras oppletum
- †Valcouroceras
  - †Valcouroceras seelyi
  - †Valcouroceras tenuiseptum
- †Vermontella
  - †Vermontella secunda – type locality for species
- †Vogdesia – tentative report
  - †Vogdesia obtusus
- †Westergaardodina
  - †Westergaardodina bicuspidata
- †Westonaspis
  - †Westonaspis laevifrons
- †Wimanella – tentative report
  - †Wimanella orientalis
- †Yukonaspis
- †Zacanthoides
  - †Zacanthoides kelsayae – type locality for species
- †Zittelella
  - †Zittelella varians

== Mesozoic ==
The Paleobiology Database records no known occurrences of Mesozoic fossils in Vermont.

== Cenozoic ==
- Alangium
- †Caldesia
- †Caricoidea
- Carya
- Cleyera
- Cylichna
  - †Cylichna alba
- Delphinapterus
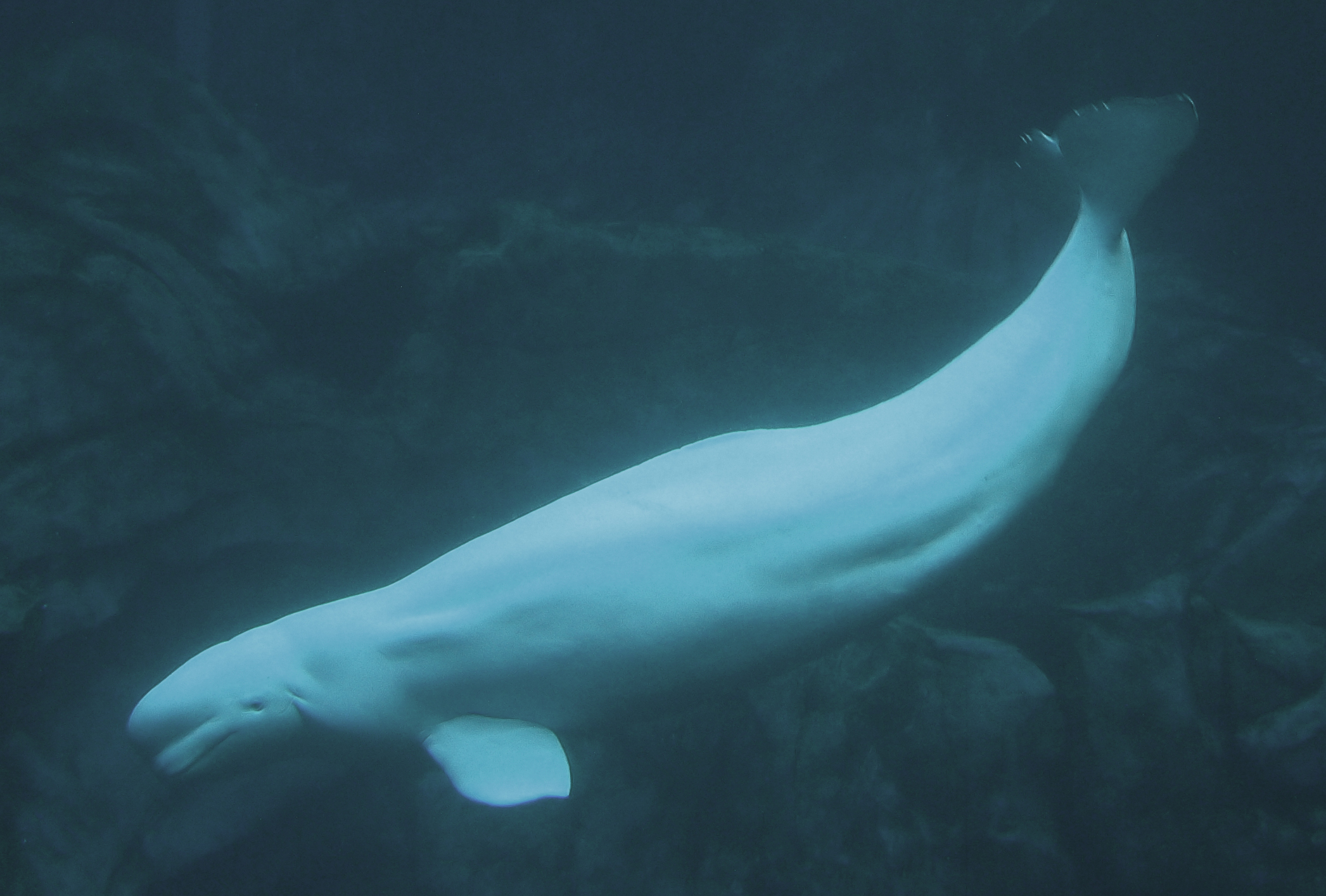
  - A living Delphinapterus leucas, or beluga whale
    †Delphinapterus leucas
- Euodia
- †Gordonia
- Hiatella
  - †Hiatella arctica
- Huxleyia
- Ilex
- †Illicium
- Macoma
  - †Macoma balthica
  - †Macoma calcarea
- Magnolia
- †Mammuthus primigenius
- †Microdiptera
- †Moroidea
- †Mya
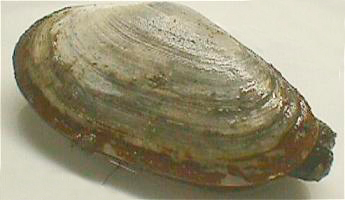
  - A modern Mya arenaria, or soft-shell clam
    †Mya arenaria
- Mytilus
  - †Mytilus edulis
- †Nyssa
- †Parthenocissus
- Persea
- †Phellodendron
- Portlandia
  - †Portlandia glacialis
- Pusa
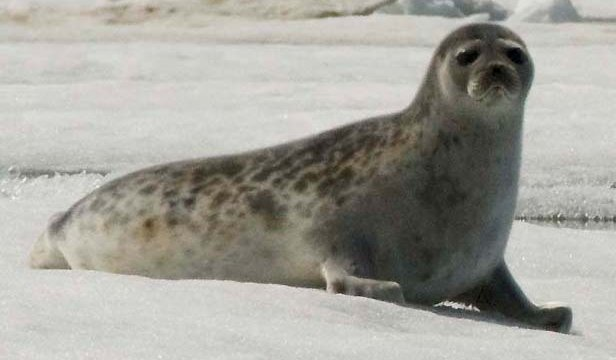
  - A living Pusa hispida, or ringed seal
    †Pusa hispida
- Quercus
- Rubus
- †Sargentodoxa
  - †Sargentodoxa barghoorniana – type locality for species
- Symplocos
- Thyasira
  - †Thyasira gouldii
- †Turpinia
- Vitis
- Zanthoxylum
