= Rangeroceratidae =

Rangeroceratidae Temporal range: L Ordovician (Cassinian)

Scientific classification
- Kingdom: Animalia
- Phylum: Mollusca
- Class: Cephalopoda
- Order: †Dissidocerida
- Family: †Rangeroceratidae; Evans, 2005

Genera
- Rangeroceras; Anrangeroceras; Cyclorageroceras

Family of molluscs

Rangeroceratidae is a family of orthoceroid cephalopods known from the late Early Ordovician in eastern North America (New York and Quebec) and Great Britain, included in the order Dissidocerida. The family was named by Evans, 2005, and contains three genera: Rangeroceras, Anrangeroceras, and Cyclorageroceras.

Rangeroceratidae is based on the genus Rangeroceras, named by Hook & Flower (1977); at that time considered a member of the rod-bearing Baltoceratidae along with genera like Rhabdiferoceras and Veneficoceras.
