= Cartersoceras =

Cartersoceras Temporal range: M Ordovician

Scientific classification
- Kingdom: Animalia
- Phylum: Mollusca
- Class: Cephalopoda
- Order: †Orthocerida
- Family: †Baltoceratidae
- Genus: †Cartersoceras; Flower, 1964

Genus of nautiloid cephalopods

Cartersoceras is a genus of nautiloid cephalopods placed in the Orthocerid family Baltoceratidae, established by Rousseau Flower (1964), for species formally included in part in Murrayoceras, and in part in "Sacotoceras". This group is typical of Murrayoceras in all features except that the siphuncle segments are convex in outline. It is known from the Middle Ordovician of the eastern United States.

The type species Cartersoceras shideliri Flower from the Carters Limestone, Beach Grove, Tennessee, shows a ventral rod secreted calcite in the siphuncle and thick, fibrous connecting rings which are not layered as in early Ellesmerocerida. C.noveboracense, originally referred to Murrayoceras, from the Amsterdam Limestone of New York, known from a weathered portion of the phragmocone, shows part of the siphuncle filled with calcite, determined to represent a secreted ventral rod. The ventral rod and unlayered connecting rings were used to place this genus in the rod-bearing Baltoceratidae.

Frey (1995) retained Cartersoceras in the Baltoceratidae while Kroger et al. (2007) included it in the Sactorthoceratidae, in spite of the ventral rod.

Carteroceras is probably closely related to genera like Rhabdiferoceras and Murrayoceras and more distantly to such as Tajaroceras and Veneficoceras
