= Rangeroceras =

Rangeroceras Temporal range: Cassinian

Scientific classification
- Kingdom: Animalia
- Phylum: Mollusca
- Class: Cephalopoda
- Order: †Dissidocerida
- Family: †Rangeroceratidae
- Genus: †Rangeroceras; Hook & Flower, 1977

Extinct orthoceratoid cephalopod genus

Rangeroceras is an extinct orthoceratoid cephalopod genus that lived in what is now western North America during the latter part of the Early Ordovician.

== Background ==
Shells of Rangeroceras are smooth, slightly depressed, rod-bearing orthocones with moderately large submarginal siphuncles. The siphuncular rods, which lie along the lower (ventral) side of the siphuncle interiors show thin, slightly undulating, growth lamellae in vertical longitudinal section, a somewhat unusual feature. Dorsal annuli only begin to form when the rod has almost filled the entire siphuncle toward to apical end. Connecting rings are thin, but layered. Cameral deposits are known from the dorsal side, the ventral side of the type specimen lost from erosion.

Hook and Flower (1977) originally placed Rangeroceras in the family Baltoceratidae because of the siphunclular rod and thin connecting rings. Evans (2005) proposed the family Rangeroceratidae for Rangeroceras and a somewhat similar genus Cyclorangeroceras from Great Britain and included them in the Dissidocerida.

Rangeroceras is named for one of the characters, the range ranger, in the Tajar stories by Jane Shaw Ward. Other Tajar story based genera include Tajaroceras, Wardoceras, and Veneficoceras The type, Rangeroceras hintzei came from the Wahwah Limestone in the Ibex area in Western Utah.
