= Sactorthoceratidae =

Scientific classification
- Kingdom: Animalia
- Phylum: Mollusca
- Class: Cephalopoda
- Order: †Orthocerida
- Superfamily: †Orthocerataceae
- Family: †Sactorthoceratidae; Flower, 1946

Genera
- See text

Extinct family of nautiloids

The Sactorthoceratidae comprise Orthocerataceaen genera with a subcentral suborthochoanitic siphuncle composed of slightly expanded segments and free of organic deposits. The camerae (chambers) of the phragmocone (chambered portion) likewise have organic deposits that are typically retarded or sparse.

== Discussion ==
The family, Sactorthoceratidae, was established by Rousseau Flower in 1946, based on the genus Sactorthoceras. In 1962 Flower pointed out the problem of defining the Sactorthoceratidae based on Sactorthoceras; there being three species groups within the genus: those with (1) short camerae and rather short tubular septal necks, (2) long camerae and slightly expanded siphuncle segments, (3) typically tubular siphuncle segments that are rapidly contracted at the septal foremina. In defining the Sactorthceratidae, the second group with slightly expanded segments was considered. However the type species S. goniaseptum belongs to the third group, with contracted segments.

Recent classification includes Braulioceras, Cartersoceras, Centroonoceras, Glenisteroceras, Leptoplatophrenoceras, Murrayoceras, Sactorthoceras, Scipioceras, Sigmocycloceras, Wennanoceras, and Wolungoceras, with the Sactorthoceratidae expanded well beyond the composition in the Treatise (1964), consisting then only of Sactorthoceras, Centroonoceras, and Sigmocycloceras.

Among genera now included in the Sactorthoceratidae, Glenisteroceras and Wolungoceras were included tentatively in the Troedssonellidae in the Treatise (Sweet, 1964); Cartersoceras and Murrayoceras in the Baltoceratidae in NMBM&MR Memoir 12 (Flower 1964). Flower (1964) classified Wolungoceras as an empty siphuncle baltoceratid. Cartersoceras and Murrayoceras were given (ibid) as rod-bearing baltoceratids. Braulioceras, Leptoplatophrenoceras, Scipioceras, and Wennanoceras are more recent additions.
