= Wardoceras =

Wardoceras Temporal range: L Ordovician (Cassinian)

Scientific classification
- Kingdom: Animalia
- Phylum: Mollusca
- Class: Cephalopoda
- Order: †Orthocerida
- Family: †Michelinoceratidae
- Genus: †Wardoceras; Hook and Flower, 1977

Extinct genus of nautiloids

Wardoceras is an extinct nautiloid genus from the late Early Ordovician of Western Utah, assigned to the orthocerid family, Michelinoceratidae

== Background ==
Shells of Wardoceras are smooth and orthoconic, with a circular cross section and small subcentral siphuncle, the segments of which are ventrally straight and dorsally slightly expanded into the camerae. The siphuncle is completely encircled internally by a thin lining that thickens and thins rhythmically so as to slightly thicken just forward of the septal necks, suggesting an origin in annular deposits. Cameral deposits are well developed and are thick, almost filling the ventral portion of the more apical chambers but also found in dorsal chambers as well.

Wardoceras is represented by the type species, Wardoceras orygoforme which is known only from the holotype, a 97mm long portion of a phragmocone 13.5mm in diameter at the anterior end; found 25.9 m (85 ft) above the base of the Wahwah Limestone, section J, Ibex area, Utah.

Wardoceras is named for Jane Shaw Ward, author of the Tajar stories. See also Tajaroceras, Rangeroceras, and Veneficoceras

== See also ==
- Nautiloid
  - List of nautiloids
