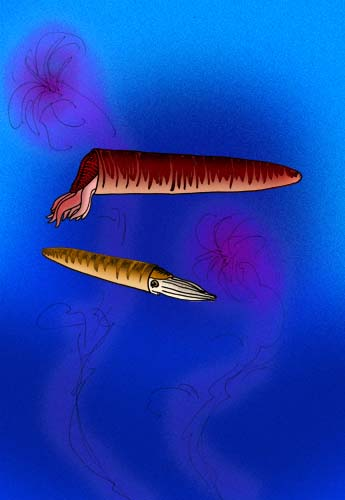
- Comparison of Buttsoceras and Oxfordoceras

Scientific classification
- Kingdom: Animalia
- Phylum: Mollusca
- Class: Cephalopoda
- Order: †Dissidocerida
- Family: †Troedssonellidae; Kobayashi 1935

Genera
- Tajaroceras; Buttsoceras; Oxfordoceras; Troedsonnella; ?Glenisteroceras; ?Wolungoceras

= Troedssonellidae =

Troedssonellidae Temporal range: L Ord (Cassinian) - MOrd (Whiterockian)

Family of molluscs

Troedssonellidae is a family of orthoceroid cephalopods from the Ordovician, derived from rod-bearing Baltoceratidae, that have a continuous lining within the siphuncle that resembles very thin and slender endocones. Shells are generally slender and orthoconic. The siphuncle is central or subcentral, composed of straight or slightly expanded segments. Septal necks generally short and connecting rings are thin. Thin cameral deposits (lining the chambers) are known, which along with the position of the siphuncle and thin connecting rings distinguishes them from the endocerids in which they have been included.

Troedsonnellids first appear high in Lower Ordovician (Cassinian) strata, beginning with Tajaroceras and extend at least through the Whiterock Stage of the Middle Ordovician. They also may have given rise to the Striatoceratidae and to the Narthecoceratidae of the Middle and Late Ordovician.

== Genera ==
- Tajaroceras
- Buttsoceras
- Oxfordoceras
- Ctenoceras
- Troedsonnella

Genera of dubious placement:

- Glenisteroceras
- Wolungoceras
