= Braulioceras =

Braulioceras Temporal range: Middle Ordovician

Scientific classification
- Kingdom: Animalia
- Phylum: Mollusca
- Class: Cephalopoda
- Order: †Orthocerida
- Family: †Sactorthoceratidae
- Genus: †Braulioceras; Kröger et al, 2007

Extinct genus of nautiloids

Braulioceras is a smooth, orthoconic orthocerid with very close spaced septa (around 8 over a length equal to the diameter of the shell) added to the Sactorthoceratidae in 2007. The type species, Braulioceras sanjuanense comes from the Middle Ordovician of the San Juan Formation, Argentine Precordillera.

Braulioceras is very similar to Sactorthoceras. The siphuncle is central, with orthochoanitic septal necks and segments which are slightly expanded between septa, giving it a beaded appearance. The thickness of the connecting rings is similar to that in ellesmerocerids. Endosiphuncular or cameral deposits are unknown.

Braulioceras is distinguished from Sactorthoceras by its more closely central siphuncle, and expanded segments without the contractions at the ends as in the type species of Sactorthoceras, S. gonioseptatum.
