= Murrayoceras =

Murrayoceras Temporal range: M Ordovician

Scientific classification
- Kingdom: Animalia
- Phylum: Mollusca
- Class: Cephalopoda
- Order: †Orthocerida
- Family: †Baltoceratidae
- Genus: †Murrayoceras; Foeste, 1926

Genus of nautiloids

Murrayoceras is a nautilid cephalopod included in the orthocerid family Baltoceratidae, widespread in the Middle Ordovician of North America, characterized by a depressed orthoconic shell with a subtriangular cross section and flattened venter and a proportionally large ventral siphuncle, 0.15 to 0.3 the dorso-ventral shell diameter. Septa are close spaced with sutures forming broad lobes on the upper flanks and ventral surface.

As originally perceived Murrayoceras included species differing in siphuncle profile. Those in which the siphuncle segments are externally convex were redefined as Cartersoceras., leaving Murrayoceras with those having essentially straight, tubular, or slightly concave segments.

Murrayoceras has a ventral rod in the siphuncle, putting it thereby in the rod-bearing Baltoceratidae, and closely related to Rhabdiferoceras and Cartersoceras, among others. In some recent classifications however Murrayoceras has been reassigned to the Sactorthoceratidae although Frey (1995) did retain the genus in the Baltoceratidae.
