= Semiannuloceras =

Semiannuloceras Temporal range: Ordovician

Scientific classification
- Kingdom: Animalia
- Phylum: Mollusca
- Class: Cephalopoda
- Order: †Orthocerida
- Family: †Baltoceratidae
- Genus: †Semiannuloceras; Evans, 2005

Extinct genus of molluscs

Semiannuloceras is an extinct genus of actively mobile carnivorous cephalopod of the family Baltoceratidae that lived in what would be Europe during the Ordovician from 490–460 mya, existing for approximately 6 million years.

== Taxonomy ==
Semiannuloceras was named by Evans (2005). Its type is Semiannuloceras abbeyense. It was assigned to Baltoceratidae by Evans (2005).

== Morphology ==
The shell is usually long, and may be straight ("orthoconic") or gently curved. In life, these animals may have been similar to the modern squid, except for the long shell.
