= Eosomichelinoceras =

Eosomichelinoceras Temporal range: Ordovician 461–452 Ma

Scientific classification
- Kingdom: Animalia
- Phylum: Mollusca
- Class: Cephalopoda
- Order: †Orthocerida
- Family: †Baltoceratidae
- Genus: †Eosomichelinoceras; Chen (1974)

Extinct genus of molluscs

Eosomichelinoceras is an extinct genus from the actively mobile carnivorous cephalopod family Baltoceratidae that lived in what would be Asia and South America during the Ordovician from 461—452 mya, existing for approximately 9 million years.

== Taxonomy ==
Eosomichelinoceras was named by Chen (1974) Its type is Eosomichelinoceras huananense. It was assigned to Orthocerida by Chen (1974); and to Baltoceratidae by Kröger et al. (2007).

== Morphology ==
Eosomichelinoceras is a smooth or transversally lirate slender, orthoconic baltoceratid with a narrow, tubular siphuncle, located between the center and the edge of the shell. Connecting rings are thin, septal necks orthochoanitic, and without known endosiphuncular or cameral deposits.

== Distribution ==
Fossils of Eosomichelinoceras have been found in Argentina, China and Iran.
