= Microbaltoceras =

Microbaltoceras Temporal range: Early Ordovician

Scientific classification
- Domain: Eukaryota
- Kingdom: Animalia
- Phylum: Mollusca
- Class: Cephalopoda
- Order: †Orthocerida
- Family: †Baltoceratidae
- Genus: †Microbaltoceras; Flower (1964)

Species
- M. minore

Extinct genus of molluscs

Microbaltoceras is an extinct genus of the cephalopod family Baltoceratidae that lived in what would be North America during the Early Ordovician. It was named by Rousseau Flower (1964) and assigned by him to the Baltoceratidae. The type species is Microbaltoceras minore which was found in the Threadgill Member of the Tanyard Formation in Gillespie County, Texas, USA.

The shell of Microbaltoceras is straight (orthconic) and tiny, with the siphuncle in narrow contact with the inner ventral surface. Its inclusion in the Baltoceratidae rather than in the Ellesmeroceratidae is based in large part on the lack of observable diaphragms in the siphuncle. The holotype of Microbaltoceras minore is only 10mm long, essentially all phragmocone.
