= Castelloceras =

Castelloceras Temporal range: Middle Ordovician–Early Devonian

Scientific classification
- Kingdom: Animalia
- Phylum: Mollusca
- Class: Cephalopoda
- Order: †Orthocerida
- Family: †Baltoceratidae
- Genus: †Castelloceras; Eichwald (1860)

Extinct genus of molluscs

Castelloceras is an extinct genus of actively mobile carnivorous cephalopod of the family Baltoceratidae that lived in what would be Europe during the Ordovician from 468—443.7 mya, existing for approximately 24.3 million years.

== Taxonomy ==
Castelloceras was named by Evans (2005). Its type is Castelloceras arennigense. It was assigned to Baltoceratidae by Evans (2005).

== Sources ==
- Fossils (Smithsonian Handbooks) by David Ward
