= Glenisteroceras =

Glenisteroceras Temporal range: late Early Ordovician

Scientific classification
- Kingdom: Animalia
- Phylum: Mollusca
- Class: Cephalopoda
- Order: †Dissidocerida
- Family: †Troedssonellidae
- Genus: †Glenisteroceras; Flower, 1957

Genus of molluscs

Glenesteroceras, which is of questionable validity, is based on a single specimen from the Lower Ordovician of New York state, described by Rousseau Flower, 1957.

Glenestoceras is described as being a weakly annulate orthocone with a circular cross section and large central siphuncle with slightly divergent necks, thick connecting rings, and expanded segments. Description is based on an incomplete immature phragmocone with a 5mm cross section.
