= Cochlioceras =

Cochlioceras Temporal range: 478 – 464 Ma Upper Lower to Lower Middle Ordovician

Scientific classification
- Domain: Eukaryota
- Kingdom: Animalia
- Phylum: Mollusca
- Class: Cephalopoda
- Order: †Orthocerida
- Family: †Baltoceratidae
- Genus: †Cochlioceras; Eichwald (1860)

Extinct genus of molluscs

Cochlioceras is an extinct baltoceratid genus from the lower and middle Ordovician (Arenig - Llanvrin) of what are now Europe, the U.S. (Vermont), and China, having existed for approximately 14 million years, from about 478 to 464 mya.

== Taxonomy ==
Cochlioceras was named by Eichwald (1860). Its type is Cochlioceras avus. It was assigned to the Baltoceratidae by Furtnish and Glensiter in Teichert et al. (1964) and removed, with the Baltoceratidae, from the Ellesmerocerida to the Orthocerida by Kroger et al. (2007)
