= Sigmocycloceras =

Sigmocycloceras Temporal range: M. Ordovician

Scientific classification
- Kingdom: Animalia
- Phylum: Mollusca
- Class: Cephalopoda
- Order: †Orthocerida
- Family: †Sactorthoceratidae
- Genus: †Sigmocycloceras; Kobayashi, 1934

Genus of nautiloids

Sigmocycloceras is a nautiloid cephalopod discovered in the Middle Ordovician of Korea, said to be similar to Sactorthoceras, and included in the Sactorthoceratidae, but unique in being longitudinally sigmoid and sculpted with transverse annuli.
