= Endorioceras =

Endorioceras Temporal range: Ordovician

Scientific classification
- Kingdom: Animalia
- Phylum: Mollusca
- Class: Cephalopoda
- Order: †Orthocerida
- Family: †Baltoceratidae
- Genus: †Endorioceras; Flower (1964)

Extinct genus of molluscs

Endorioceras is an extinct genus of actively mobile carnivorous cephalopod of the family Baltoceratidae that lived in what would be North America during the Ordovician from 490–479 mya, existing for approximately 11 million years.

== Taxonomy ==
Endorioceras was named by Flower (1964). It is not extant. Its type is Endorioceras rarum. It was assigned to Baltoceratidae by Flower (1964); and to Ellesmerocerida by Sepkoski (2002).

== Morphology ==
The shell is usually long, and may be straight ("orthoconic") or gently curved. In life, these animals may have been similar to the modern squid, except for the long shell.
