= Veneficoceras =

Veneficoceras Temporal range: L Ordovician (Cassinian)

Scientific classification
- Domain: Eukaryota
- Kingdom: Animalia
- Phylum: Mollusca
- Class: Cephalopoda
- Order: †Orthocerida
- Family: †Baltoceratidae
- Genus: †Veneficoceras; Hook and Flower, 1977

Extinct genus of molluscs

Veneficoceras is a genus of the rod-bearing Baltoceratidae, an extinct cephalopod family with characteristics of the orthoceratoid Dissidocerida, found in Cassinianage, Lower Ordovician, limestone in western Utah.

== Background ==
Veneficoceras has a large tubular siphuncle with thin connecting rings that lies along the interior ventral margin. The endosiphuncular rod appears in vertical section to bifurcate into a larger ventral rod on the bottom and a smaller and shorter dorsal rod on top. In cross section a complete lining all around would probably appear, with a dorsally offset central opening.

Veneficoceras is represented only by the type species, Veneficoceras susanae of which there is only the holotype, a 40 millimetres (1.6 in) long portion of a phragmocone that came from a little over 15 metres (49 ft) above the base of the Wahwah limestone in the Ibex area, western Utah.

Veneficaceras is named for the witch in the Tajar stories by Jane Shaw Ward. Other genera whose names are based on the same stories are Tajaroceras. Rangeroceras, and Wardoceras
