= Rioceras =

Rioceras Temporal range: Lower Ordovician

Scientific classification
- Domain: Eukaryota
- Kingdom: Animalia
- Phylum: Mollusca
- Class: Cephalopoda
- Order: †Orthocerida
- Family: †Baltoceratidae
- Genus: †Rioceras; Flower (1964)

Extinct genus of molluscs

Rioceras is an extinct genus of orthocerid cephalopods of the family Baltoceratidae that lived in what would be North America during the Early Ordovician from 480—472 mya, existing for approximately 8 million years.

== Taxonomy ==
Rioceras was named by Flower (1964). Its type is Rioceras nondescriptum. It was assigned to Baltoceratidae by Flower (1964) and Hook and Flower (1977), but reassigned to the Ellesmeroceratidae by Kröger et al. (2007)

Whether Rioceras is assigned to the Baltoceratidae and therefore to the Orthocerida or to the Ellesmeroceratidae depends on the definition of each. Flower placed Rioceras in the Baltoceratidae when he proposed the genus since it lacks diaphragms in the siphuncle which for him was a defining character of the family. Kröger removed Rioceras to the Ellesmeroceratidae on the basis of its inwardly thicked connecting rings which produce concave segments, a defining character of that family as emended. Flower did point out in his original diagnosis that Rioceras has moderately thick connecting rings "of ellesmeroceratoid aspect"

== Morphology ==
The shell is usually long, and may be straight ("orthoconic") or gently curved. In life, these animals may have been similar to the modern squid, except for the long shell.
