= Centroonoceras =

Centroonoceras Temporal range: Middle Ordovician

Scientific classification
- Domain: Eukaryota
- Kingdom: Animalia
- Phylum: Mollusca
- Class: Cephalopoda
- Order: †Orthocerida
- Family: †Sactorthoceratidae
- Genus: †Centroonoceras; Kobayashi, 1934

Extinct genus of molluscs

Centroonoceras is a middle Ordovician cyrtoconic nautiloid cephalopod, otherwise similar to the orthoconic Sactorthoceras and also included in the Sactorthoceratidae. It was named by Kobayashi, 1934, and has been found in Korea and in New York state in the eastern U.S.

Centroonoceras is characterized by a smooth, gently expanding shell with a moderate but definite curvature and circular cross section. Septa are close spaced. The siphuncle is subcentral, as in Sactorthoceras. Segments are subfusiform; generally straighter on the dorsal side and more expanded on the ventral side. No cameral or endosiphuncle deposits are known.
