= Metabaltoceras =

Metabaltoceras Temporal range: Early Ordovician

Scientific classification
- Kingdom: Animalia
- Phylum: Mollusca
- Class: Cephalopoda
- Order: †Orthocerida
- Family: †Baltoceratidae
- Genus: †Metabaltoceras; Flower, 1964

Species
- M. fusiforme; M. minutum

Extinct genus of nautiloids

Metabaltoceras, first described by Rousseau Flower in 1964, is a fossil cephalopod genus in the family Baltoceratidae, with a small, slender, fairly fusiform shell, and a large empty siphuncle in contact with the ventral surface. The siphuncle is achoanitic, having virtually no septal necks, segments formed all but entirely by connecting rings. Shells are generally straight, beginning with a subcircular cross section in the adapical portion but becoming faintly depressed adorally (toward the front). Sutures are straight and transverse except ventrally, where they produce deep, prominent lobes.

== Species ==
The holotype of Matabaltoceras fusiforme is a 48mm long specimen, consisting of 23mm of phragmocone and 25mm of living, or body, chamber, that was found in an erratic boulder of Fort Cassin Limestone between West Chazy and Beekmantown in upstate New York in the United States, associated with Proterocameroceras brainerdi and Centrotarphyceras seelyi. A second and older species, Metabaltoceras menutum, is based on a 28mm long specimen from beds just above the oolite in Mudsprings Mountain in southern New Mexico. Originally in the collection of Rousseau Flower, both are now in the collection of the New Mexico Museum of Natural History and Science in Albuquerque.
