= Cyptendoceras =

Cyptendoceras Temporal range: Early Ordovician 475–472 Ma

Scientific classification
- Kingdom: Animalia
- Phylum: Mollusca
- Class: Cephalopoda
- Subclass: Nautiloidea
- Order: †Ellesmerocerida
- Family: †Ellesmeroceratidae
- Genus: †Cyptendoceras; Ulrich and Foerste (1936)

Genus of molluscs

Cyptendoceras is an extinct nautiloid cephalopod included in the family Ellesmeroceratidae that lived in what would be North and South America during the latter part of the Early Ordovician (late Arenig) from about 475 – 472 mya, existing for approximately 3 million years.

== Taxonomy ==
Cyptendoceras was named by Ulrich and Foerste (1936). Teichert (1964, in the Treatise), included it in the endocerid family Proterocameroceratidae. Flower (1964) assigned it to the Baltoceratidae, at that time included in the Ellesmeroceratida. Kroger et al. (2007) reassigned it to the Ellesmeroceratidae on the basis of the ellesmeroceratid type siphuncle, removing it from the Baltoceratidae which had been reassigned to the Orthocerida.

== Distribution ==
Fossils of Cyptendoceras have been found in Argentina, Bolivia and the United States (Minnesota, Nevada, New Mexico, Texas, Vermont).
