= Cyrtobaltoceras =

Cyrtobaltoceras Temporal range: Ordovician

Scientific classification
- Kingdom: Animalia
- Phylum: Mollusca
- Class: Cephalopoda
- Order: †Orthocerida
- Family: †Baltoceratidae
- Genus: †Cyrtobaltoceras; Flower (1964)

Extinct genus of molluscs

Cyrtobaltoceras is an extinct cephalopod genus known from the upper Lower Ordovician Fort Cassin Formation at Valcour, N.Y. that is included in the Nautiloid family Baltoceratidae

== Taxonomy ==
Cyrtobaltoceras was named by Flower (1964) who then assigned it to the Baltoceratidae which at that time was included in the Ellesmerocerida. The Baltoceratidae, along with included genera, has since been moved to the Orthocerida.

== Morphology ==
The genotype, Cyrobaltoceras gracile Flower, is based on a small, slender, incomplete, 25 mm long shell with a slight exogastric curvature. Sutures form lobes across the ventral side but go transversely straight across the dorsum. The siphuncle is proportionally large, almost half the shell diameter in width, and lies against the ventral margin.

== Retention ==
The holotype of Cyrtobaltoceras gracile, Reusseau Flower's no. 341, is housed in the paleontological collection of the New Mexico Museum of Natural History and Science in Albuquerque, N.M (U.S.A)
