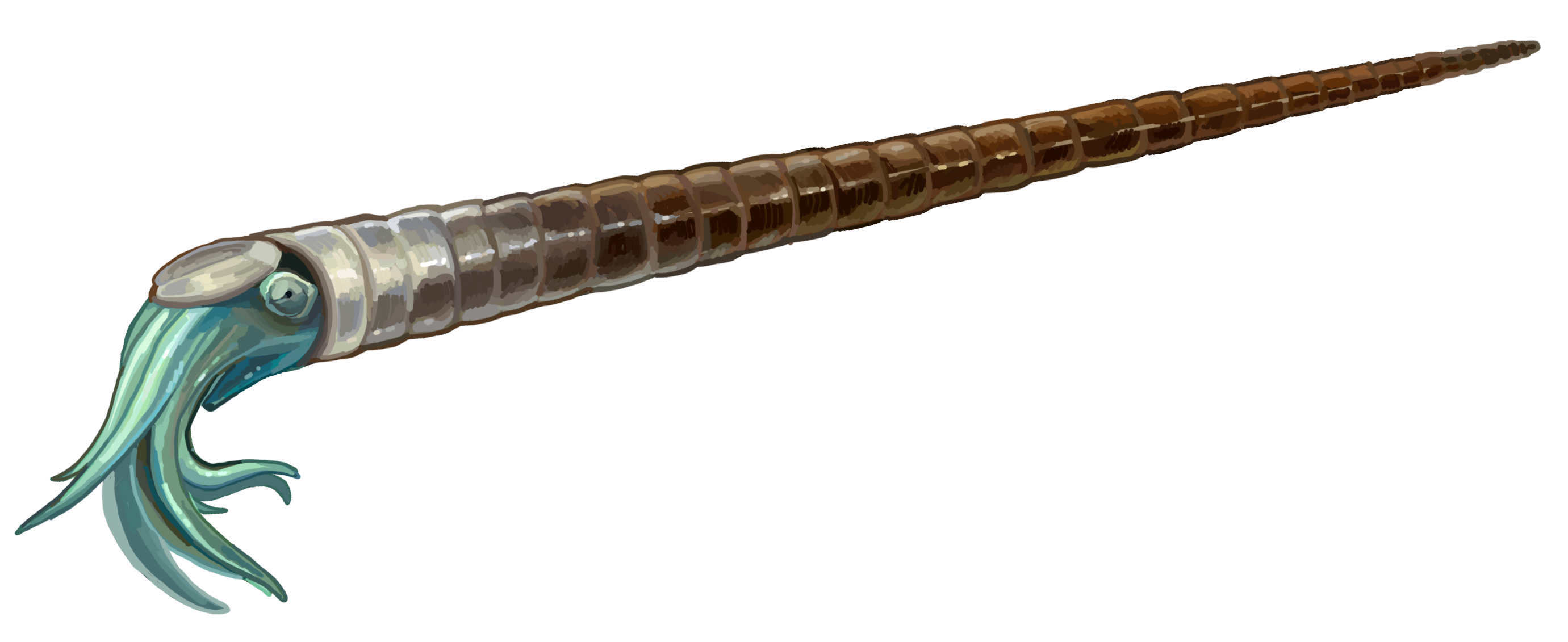
- Artist's depiction of Narthecoceras

Scientific classification
- Kingdom: Animalia
- Phylum: Mollusca
- Class: Cephalopoda
- Order: †Orthocerida
- Family: †Narthecoceratidae

= Narthecoceratidae =

Narthecoceratidae Temporal range: Ordovician 460.5–449 Ma

Extinct family of molluscs

Narthecoceratidae is an extinct family of orthocone cephalopods who lived in marine environments in what is now North America during the Ordovician from 460.5—449 mya, existing for approximately 11.5 million years.

== Taxonomy ==
Narthecoceratidae was named by Flower (1958). It was assigned to Endocerida by Teichert et al. (1964); and reassigned to Orthocerida by Frey (1981).

== Morphology ==
The shell is usually long, and may be straight ("orthoconic") or gently curved. In life, these animals may have been similar to the modern squid, except for the long shell.

== Fossil distribution ==
Fossil distribution includes Ohio, Franklin District, Canada, and Manitoba, Canada.
