= Sactorthoceras =

Sactorthoceras Temporal range: M Ordovician -?Silurian

Scientific classification
- Kingdom: Animalia
- Phylum: Mollusca
- Class: Cephalopoda
- Order: †Orthocerida
- Family: †Sactorthoceratidae
- Genus: †Sactorthoceras; Kobayashi, 1934

Extinct genus of molluscs

Sactorthceras is an orthoceratoid genus (subclass Nautiloidea s.l.) known from the Middle Ordovician of eastern North America (NY), Norway and Korea and is the type of genus of the Sactorthoceratidae.

Sactorthceras was named by Kobayashi in 1934 to include smooth or striated, straight or slightly curved longicones with short camerae and slender, subcentral, suborthochoanitic siphuncles with segments slightly inflated and no cameral deposits.

Sactorthocras has also been recognized in the Silurian Racine Formation of Wisconsin and from the Ordovician of China and Iran. Related genera include Centroonoceras and Sigmocycloceras

== -References- ==
- Sweet, Walter C. 1964. Nautiloidea -Orthocerida. Treatise on Invertebrate Paleontology, Part K. Geological Soc. of America and Univ of Kansas press.
- Sactorthoceras ref Paleodb
