= Exigua =

Exigua Temporal range: Dresbachian

Scientific classification
- Kingdom: Animalia
- Phylum: Arthropoda
- Clade: †Artiopoda
- Class: †Trilobita
- Order: †Ptychopariida
- Family: †Plethopeltidae
- Genus: †Exigua; Howell, 1937

Species
- E. quadrata Howell, 1937 (type species); E. pulchellus Lochman, 1940 = Brassicicephalus pulchellus; E. quebeckensis (Rassetti, 1946) = Brassicicephalus quebeckensis; E. woolfensis (Lochman, 1944) = Brassicicephalus woolfensis

Synonyms
- Brassicicephalus Lochman, 1940

Extinct genus of arthropods

Exigua (synonym: Brassicicephalus) is an extinct genus from a well-known class of fossil marine arthropods, the trilobites. It lived from 501 to 497 million years ago during the Dresbachian faunal stage of the late Cambrian Period. Exigua is only known from the central part of the headshield or cranidium, so free cheeks (or librigenae), thorax and pygidium are unknown.

== Etymology ==
Exigua, is Latin meaning small, meager or sparse, referring to the small size of the only parts known of these trilobites, namely the cranidia. The synonym Brassicicephalus is a combination of Brassica (Latin, "cabbage") and κεφαλή, kephalē (Greek: "head") for the strongly convex glabella and fixed cheeks separated by a deep furrow.
