= Rhabdiferoceras =

Rhabdiferoceras Temporal range: Lower Ordovician

Scientific classification
- Domain: Eukaryota
- Kingdom: Animalia
- Phylum: Mollusca
- Class: Cephalopoda
- Order: †Orthocerida
- Family: †Baltoceratidae
- Genus: †Rhabdiferoceras; Flower (1964)

Species
- R. annuliferum; R. planiseptatum

Extinct genus of molluscs

Rhabdiferoceras is an extinct genus of orthocerids belonging to the Baltoceratidae that lived in what would be North America during the Cassinian Stage at the end of the Early Ordovician, existing for approximately two million years from about 474 -472 mya.

== Taxonomy ==
Rhabdiferoceras was named by Flower (1964). Its type is Rhabdiferoceras annuliferum. It was assigned to Baltoceratidae by Flower (1964) and Hook and Flower (1977).

== Morphology ==
Rhabdiferoceras is a rod-bearing baltoceratid with undulations on the dorsal side of the ventral siphuncular rod that correspond to the segments of the siphuncle. Septal necks are very short, connecting rings are layered and are slightly expanded and gently convex from the outside. The genotype, Rhadiferoceras annuliferum Flower is known only from sectioning a limestone block, presumed to be of Cassinian age from the Pogonip Group from the northern end of the Ely Springs Range, Nevada. The siphuncle is rather large, in proportion, and slightly removed from the venter, considered a baltoceratid aspect.

We can only guess at what the animal may have been like or as to its habits. As an orthocerid it may have had 8 or 10 long arms or tentacles projecting from its head, as found in modern squids, belemnites, and indicated for Upper Ordovician Orthonybyoceras and Silurian Michelinoceras.
