= Tajaroceras =

Tajaroceras Temporal range: LOrdovician (Cassinian)

Scientific classification
- Kingdom: Animalia
- Phylum: Mollusca
- Class: Cephalopoda
- Order: †Dissidocerida
- Family: †Troedssonellidae
- Genus: †Tajaroceras; Hook and Flower (1976)

Extinct genus of molluscs

Tajaroceras is an extinct slender cephalopod from the uppermost Lower Ordovician of western North America, belonging to the Orthocerid family Troedssonellidae.

== Background ==
The shell of Tajaroceras is smooth and straight. The siphuncle which is at least 0.35 the shell diameter is subcentral. Septal necks are short and the connecting rings are thin and homogeneous. The distinguishing feature of Tajaroceras lies within its siphuncle. Along the ventral side, within the siphuncle, is a continuous rod, much like that found in a group known as rod-bearing Baltoceratidae. On the dorsal side, overlying within, are annular deposits that grow forward to form a continuous lining that ultimately rests against the ventral rod, leaving a small opening slightly above the center. The camerae contain deposits of organic calcite.

Tajaroceras, first described by Hook and Flower (1976), has been found in the Upper Cassinian Wahwah Limestone in Western Utah and in the equivalent Florida Mountains Formation in Southern New Mexico and is the probable ancestor of the Troedssonellidae, being followed in overlapping sequence by Buttsoceras. The type, Tajaroceras wardae, was found 55–65 ft above the base of the Wahwah Ls in the Ibex area of western Utah.

Tajaroceras is named for Jane Shaw Ward's character, the Tejar.
