= Dissidocerida =

Dissidocerida Temporal range: Lower Ordovician - Lower Silurian

Scientific classification
- Domain: Eukaryota
- Kingdom: Animalia
- Phylum: Mollusca
- Class: Cephalopoda
- Subclass: †Orthoceratoidea
- Order: †Dissidocerida; Zhuravleva (1994)

Families
- See text

Extinct order of molluscs

Dissidocerida is an order of Early Ordovician to the Early Silurian orthoceratoid cephalopods in which the siphuncle has a continuous lining or a longitudinal rod-like structure within.

The order Dissidocerida was proposed by Zhuravleva (1994) for Dissidoceras undosum Zhuravleva, 1964, a Silurian orthoconic genus with a wide, nearly central, tubular siphuncle, suborthochoanitic septal necks, and endosiphuncular rod; in many aspects similar to rod-bearing orthocones of the Ordovician. It is thought by some that Ordovician-Silurian orthocones with continuous longitudinal endosiphuncular laminar deposits constitute a single phylogenetic stock.

The Dissidocerida as understood includes the Polymeridae, Rangeroceratidae, Troedssonellidae, and Dissidocertidae. The Polymeridae and Rangeroceratidae were proposed by Evans in 2005 for Polymeres Murchison 1839 and Rangeroceras Hook and Flower 1977, respectively. Troedssonellidae was established by Kobayashi in 1935 and is based on the genus Troedssonella. The Dissidoceratidae was established by Zhuravleva for Dissidoceras undosum
