= Baltoceratidae =

Baltoceratidae Temporal range: Ordovician

Scientific classification
- Domain: Eukaryota
- Kingdom: Animalia
- Phylum: Mollusca
- Class: Cephalopoda
- Order: †Orthocerida
- Family: †Baltoceratidae; Kobayashi (1935)

Genera
- †Amsleroceras; †Annbactroceras; †Bactroceras; †Castelloceras; †Cochlioceras; †Cyrtobaltoceras; †Endorioceras; †Eosomichelinoceras; †Hedstroemoceras; †Metabaltoceras; †Microbaltoceras; †Rhabdiferoceras; †Rioceras; †Semiannuloceras; †Veneficoceras

Extinct family of nautiloids

Baltoceratidae is an extinct family of orthoconic cephalopods belonging to the subclass Nautiloidea endemic to what would be Asia, Australia, Europe, North America, and South America during the Ordovician living from about 480–460 mya, existing for approximately 20 million years.

== Taxonomy ==
Baltoceratidae was named by Kobayashi (1935) and assigned to the Ellesmeroceratida by Flower and Kummel (1950) where it was retained by Unklesbay and Young (1956), again by Flower (1964), and by Furnish and Glenister in Teichert et al. (1964). Flower (1964) included the Baltoceratidae in the ellesmeroceratid suborder Ellesmeroceratina.

Further study of baltoceratid interiors, namely regarding the generally thin connecting rings and lack of siphuncular diaphragms, showed they are distinct from the typical ellesmerocerids and belong, as the ancestral group, to the Orthocerida where assigned by Kroger et al. (2007)

== Diagnosis ==
The Baltorceratidae are characterized by dominantly straight, slender, smooth shells with a moderately large ventral siphuncle composed of orthochoanitic septal necks and thin connecting rings, free of diaphragms and which in advanced forms becomes more central in position. Septa are close spaced, resulting in short camerae and may form shallow ventral lobes. Cameral deposits are normal which develop apically and more ventrally.

Two stocks are found within the Baltoceratidae, those with a calcareous rod secreted on the lower surface of the inside of the siphuncle known as "rod-bearing" and those without, in which the interior of the siphuncle tube is empty, known as "vacuosiphonate". Empty siphuncled forms, the vacuosiphonate, gave rise to the Michelinoceratidae, commonly known as the Orthoceratidae, which has its beginning in the lower Cassinian stage in the latter part of the Lower Ordovician. Rod bearing forms gave rise to the Troedsonnellidae with early members, Buttsoceras and Tajaroceras found in the upper Cassinian.

The Baltoceratidae and Orthoceratidae both have a spherical apex that lacks a cicatrix, and similar, two-layered thin connecting rings which clearly places the Baltoceratidae in the Orthocerida as well. Furthermore, the Baltoceratidae are restricted to forms with a siphuncle that is tubular or slightly expanded within the chambers, excluding genera with a more ellesmeroceratid aspect in which connecting rings thicken inwardly, such as Amsleroceras, Cyptendoceras, and Rioceras.

== See also ==
- List of nautiloids
