= Cassinian =

The Cassinian is the latest age of the Canadian Epoch when thought of temporally and the uppermost stage of the Canadian Series when thought of stratigraphically. The Canadian, either as a series or as an Epoch is the name that has been given to the Lower, or Early, Ordovician in North America and has been applied worldwide.

The Cassinian is named for the Fort Cassin Formation of Vermont. Rocks of Cassinian age are found in the Champlain Valley and among other places in North America in the Great Basin of Western Utah and Nevada, and in the uppermost El Paso Group in southern New Mexico and west Texas.

The Cassinian has been given a span of only 1.2 million years, with a range from 473 - 471.8 m.y.a. which may be short, looking at the El Paso section and Early Ordovician cephalopod evolution

In worldwide terms the Cassinian is upper, or late Arenigian which is exactly equivalent to the newly proposed Floian, both spanning the same 6.8 million years. In the four part Canadian series, the Cassinian is late upper Canadian, preceded by the Jeffersonian, and is equivalent to the upper Blackhillsian stage of the Ibexian which has been sought to replace the Canadian as the Lower Ordovician in North America. However the Ibexian, named for the Ibex region in western Utah, extends 2.7 .m.y. into the Cambrian taking up more than half of the Trempealeauan. The Cassinian is followed in North America by the Whiterockian and by the newer ICS Dapingian, given respective durations of 9.8 and 3.7 m.y. and in older chronologies by the 7.8 million year Llanvirnian.
