= Perkinsoceras =

Perkinsoceras Temporal range: M Ordovician (Chazyan)

Scientific classification
- Kingdom: Animalia
- Phylum: Mollusca
- Class: Cephalopoda
- Family: †Allotrioceratidae
- Genus: †Perkinsoceras; Flower, 1976

Genus of nautiloids

Perkinsoceras is an endocerid genus from the Middle Ordovician (Chazyan) of Champlain Valley established by Flower in 1976, which he added to his Allotrioceratidae based on certain similarities to Williamsoceras and Cacheoceras which had been added previously.

Perkinsoceras is characterized by a large ventral siphuncle in broad contact with the ventral margin of the phragmocone -the chambered portion of the shell- which is expanded into a Nanno type apex, and by a broad longitudinal ventral process about which the endocones are draped. Perkinsoceras has what have been interpreted as tubules that form where the endocones impinge on the process, a feature also interpreted in Williamsoceras, Cacheoceras and the distinctly unique Allotrioceras

Perkinsoceras differs from the generally similar Chazyoceras by its ventral process -absent in the latter, and by its more bulbous nanno type apex. Williamsoceras and Cacheoceras differ in having a straight cameroceras type apex without the expanded siphuncle. Allotrioceras differs by its vertical median partition separating the two lateral endocones. Perkinsoceras has a single set of endocones.

Two species of Perkinsoceras have been described, both early Middle Ordovician (Chazyan) in age, both from Vermont. P inflatum comes from the Crown Point Limestone, 1/2 mile south of Ferrisburg Vt. The holotype is in the Paleontology collection of the New Mexico Museum of Natural History and Science. P foerstei comes from Isle La Motte. Its holotype is at the U.S. National Museum in Washington D.C.

== See also ==
- List of nautiloids
