= Suecoceras =

Suecoceras Temporal range: Tremadocian-Darriwilian ~488–461 Ma

Scientific classification
- Domain: Eukaryota
- Kingdom: Animalia
- Phylum: Mollusca
- Class: Cephalopoda
- Subclass: Nautiloidea
- Order: †Endocerida
- Family: †Endoceratidae
- Genus: †Suecoceras; Holm, 1986

Type species
- Suecoceras marcoui Ruedemann 1906

Species
- S. marcoui Ruedemann 1906

Extinct genus of nautiloids

Suecoceras is an endoceratid (a kind of nautiloid cephalopod) that lived during the Middle Ordovician. It is characterised by a long, straight, slender shell with a slightly expanded tip that curves slightly downwards.

The shell is compressed from side to side in the humped apical portion, but circular in the rest. The siphuncle is proportionally large, 1/3 to 1/2 the shell diameter; ventral at the beginning, becoming subventral in the adult portion. Septal necks are holochoanitic to slightly maxichaonitic, extending back to the previous septum and sometimes beyond. Endocones are long and slender, with a narrow tube running down the middle.

The siphuncle takes up the entire apex, but is not swollen as in Chazyoceras or Nanno.

A typical species, S. barrande (Dewitz), whose fossil remains are known from Sweden (hence the name, Sueco- means "Swedish"), has a shell about 15 cm (5.9 in) long.

== Distribution ==
Fossils of the genus have been found in:

- Karmberg Formation, Tasmania, Australia
- Kandle Formation, Estonia
- Vaidlenai Formation, Lithuania
- Segerstad and Seby Limestones, Sweden
- Rochdale Formation, New York state
