= Meniscoceras =

Meniscoceras Temporal range: Middle Ordovician (Chazyan)

Scientific classification
- Kingdom: Animalia
- Phylum: Mollusca
- Class: Cephalopoda
- Subclass: Nautiloidea
- Order: †Bisonocerida
- Family: †Najaceratidae
- Genus: †Meniscoceras; Flower, 1941

Type species
- Meniscoceras coronense Flower, 1941

Extinct genus of nautiloids

Meniscoceras is a straight and slender Chazyan endocerid described by Rousseau Flower in 1941 The genus was originally included in the Proterocameroceratidae (Flower, 1955) but later (Flower, 1976) placed with its predecessor, Najaceras, in the Najaceratidae.

The siphuncle in Mensicoceras is large with short septal necks and thin connecting rings. Endocones are vertically asymmetric. The central cavity is dorsally concave where a broad dorsal process is formed in which is said to contain a pair of dorso-lateral blades, and flat ventrally.

Mensicoceras from the Chazy and the earlier Najaceras from the Whiterock age are similar in having a longitudual process formed along the inner dorsal side of the siphuncle around which the endocones form, but differ in details such as with the central opening. On that basis the two have been separated into their own family, the Najaceratidae (Flower 1971,1976). The Treatise on Invertebrate Paleontology (1964) shows Meniscoceras in the Proterocameroceratidae, a carry over from before the time its ancestor, Najaceras was discovered. The type species, Meniscoceras coronense, is known from the Chazyan of New York State.
