= Allocotoceras =

Allocotoceras Temporal range: Darriwilian ~468–461 Ma

Scientific classification
- Domain: Eukaryota
- Kingdom: Animalia
- Phylum: Mollusca
- Class: Cephalopoda
- Subclass: Nautiloidea
- Order: †Endocerida
- Family: †Endoceratidae
- Genus: †Allocotoceras; Teichert & Glenister 1953

Genus of nautiloids

Allocotoceras is an endocerid from the Lower Ordovician (upper Canadian) Karmberg Formation of Australia (Tasmania), included in the Endoceratidae, based on small, straight or gently curved siphuncles.

Septal necks, according to Teichert, 1964, are holochoanitic, reaching to the previous septum. Endocones are described as having a dorsal wedge, or process, making the internal opening, or endosiphocone, semicircular in cross section. In this sense Allocotoceras seems to resemble the genus Najaceras.
