= Chazyoceras =

Chazyoceras Temporal range: M Ordovician (M Chazyan)

Scientific classification
- Domain: Eukaryota
- Kingdom: Animalia
- Phylum: Mollusca
- Class: Cephalopoda
- Subclass: Nautiloidea
- Order: †Endocerida
- Family: †Endoceratidae
- Genus: †Chazyoceras; Flower, 1958

Extinct genus of molluscs

Chazyoceras ("Horn of the Chazyan") is a moderately large endocerid included in the Endoceratidae with a Nanno type apex and a ventral siphuncle with a holochoanitic (where "holo" is entire, and "choan" refers to its funnel-shaped opening) wall, characteristic of the family. The siphuncle swelling at the apex is subtriangular in longitudinal profile. The endocones are of medium length.

Chazyoceras was named by Rousseau Flower in 1958. The genotype is Chazyoceras valcourense which came from the Middle Chazyan (Lower Middle Ordovician) of Valcour Island on Lake Champlain. Chazyoceras resembles Perkinsoceras which Flower included in the Allotrioceratidae - a family which Flower named and included in the Endocerida based on the strange fossil, Allotrioceras

Both Chazyoceras and Perkinsoceras types are housed in the paleontology collection at the New Mexico Museum and Natural History and Science in Albuquerque, where they were transferred from Flower's collection at the New Mexico Bureau of Mines in Socorro.
