= Foerstellites =

Foerstellites Temporal range: Upper Ordovician

Scientific classification
- Domain: Eukaryota
- Kingdom: Animalia
- Phylum: Mollusca
- Class: Cephalopoda
- Subclass: Nautiloidea
- Order: †Endocerida
- Family: †Endoceratidae
- Genus: †Foerstellites; Kobayashi, 1940

Extinct genus of molluscs

Foerstellites is a genus of Ordovician cephalopods from North America, belonging to the family Endoceratidae, in which the siphuncle takes up the entire apex.

Foestellites, named by Kobayashi, 1940, is based on the apical part of the conch, or shell, which expands rapidly as septa are added. Not a true nanno type, since the siphuncle is not truly swollen at the apex. Probably the apical end of Cameroceras or Vaginoceras.
