= Triendoceras =

Triendoceras Temporal range: L Ordovician U Canad

Scientific classification
- Domain: Eukaryota
- Kingdom: Animalia
- Phylum: Mollusca
- Class: Cephalopoda
- Subclass: Nautiloidea
- Order: †Endocerida
- Family: †Endoceratidae
- Genus: †Triendoceras; Flower, 1958

Genus of nautiloids

Triendoceras is a genus of fairly large endocerid named by Flower (1958), included in the Endoceratidae by Teichert (1964), characterized by a holochoanitic ventral siphuncle in which the cross section through the endocones has an opening in the shape of an isosceles triangle with a sharp apex (corner) pointing down. Triendoceras is found in the upper Lower Ordovician of Quebec and New York in North America and possibly in Ohio, and in eastern Europe. The type species is T. montrealense.
