= Proterovaginoceras =

Proterovaginoceras Temporal range: Darriwilian ~466–463.5 Ma

Scientific classification
- Kingdom: Animalia
- Phylum: Mollusca
- Class: Cephalopoda
- Subclass: Nautiloidea
- Order: †Endocerida
- Family: †Endoceratidae
- Genus: †Proterovaginoceras; Reudemann, 1905

Type species
- Proterovaginoceras belemnitiforme (Holm, 1885)

Species
- P. belemnitiforme (Holm, 1885); P. incognitum (Schröder, 1882); P. rapidum Fang, 2022

Synonyms
- P. belemnitiforme; Endoceras belemnitiforme Holm 1885; P. incognitum; Dideroceras amplum Balashov 1968; Dideroceras brevispiculum Balashov 1968; Dideroceras kundense Balashov 1968; Dideroceras longispicum Balashov 1968; Dideroceras pribalticum Balashov 1968; Endoceras duplex Wahlenberg 1821; Orthoceras duplex Wahlenberg 1821; Schmidtoceras estonicum Balashov 1968; Schmidtoceras kundense Balashov 1968; Vaginoceras endoseptum Chang 1957

Extinct genus of nautiloids

Proterovaginoceras (Ancient Greek for "earlier shield horn") is a medium to large sized endocerid (endocone-bearing orthoconic nautiliod) from the Early and Middle Ordovician included in the family Endoceratidae.

Proterovaginoceras has a straight shell with a circular cross section, straight sutures, and a ventral to central, nanno-type, siphuncle which fills the entire apical part of the shell. Septal necks are macrochoanitic, up to two camerae (chambers) long; connecting rings, one chamber in length line the inside of the necks. Endocones are long and slender, fill the entire bulbous, nanno-end, of the siphuncle.

Proterovaginoceras was named by Reudemann in 1905. Dideroceras Flower 1950 and Chisloceras Gortani 1934 are probably synonymous equivalents.

== Distribution ==
Fossils of the genus have been found in:

- Loobu Formation, Estonia
- Abastu Formation, Iran
- Pivorjaiskaja Formation, Lithuania
- Huk and Stein Formations, Norway
- Gillberga, Holen and Komstad Formations, Sweden
- China
