= Cotteroceras =

Cotteroceras Temporal range: Lower Ordovician

Scientific classification
- Domain: Eukaryota
- Kingdom: Animalia
- Phylum: Mollusca
- Class: Cephalopoda
- Subclass: Nautiloidea
- Order: †Endocerida
- Family: †Proterocameroceratidae
- Genus: †Cotteroceras; Ulrich & Foerste, 1936
- Species: †C. compressum

Binomial name
- †Cotteroceras compressum Ulrich & Foerste, 1936

Extinct genus of molluscs

Cotteroceras is a genus of proterocameroceratids from the Lower Ordovician of North America and Siberia characterized by a long straight and compressed shell with very short camerae and long body chamber. Sutures are straight and oblique, sloping dorsoventrally toward the apex. The siphuncle is large but details are unknown.
