= Anthoceras =

Anthoceras Temporal range: Early Ordovician–Middle Ordovician

Scientific classification
- Kingdom: Animalia
- Phylum: Mollusca
- Class: Cephalopoda
- Subclass: Nautiloidea
- Order: †Endocerida
- Family: †Proterocameroceratidae
- Genus: †Anthoceras; Teichert and Glenister 1954

Extinct genus of molluscs

Anthoceras is a genus of straight, annulated, proterocamerioceratid molluscs (Order Endocerida) from the Lower Ordovician, found in North America, North-Western Australia, and Siberia. The cross section is circular, the siphuncle moderately large, and marginal. Segments are constricted (producing concave profiles in internal molds); septal necks hemichoantici to subholochoantic (reaching halfway to almost to the previous septum); connecting rings thick. Endocones are long and slightly asymmetric.

This genus is based on the phragmocone, the chambered part of the shell; the apical and apertural ends are unknown.

== See also ==
- Mutvei, Harry (1997). "Siphuncular structure in Ordovician endocerid cephalopods". Acta Palaeontologica Polonica. 42 (3): 375–390.
- Crick, Rex E.; Teichert, Curt (January 1983). "Ordovician endocerid genus Anthoceras: its occurrence and morphology". Alcheringa: An Australasian Journal of Palaeontology. 7 (2): 155–162. Bibcode:1983Alch....7..155C. doi:10.1080/03115518308619626. ISSN 0311-5518.
