= Allotrioceratidae =

Allotrioceratidae Temporal range: Middle Ordovician

Scientific classification
- Kingdom: Animalia
- Phylum: Mollusca
- Class: Cephalopoda
- Family: †Allotrioceratidae; Flower, 1955

The Allotrioceratidae is a family of Middle Ordovician fossils, established by Rousseau Flower, 1955, originally including Allotrioceras and Mirabilocras, assigned inferentially to the Endocerida and known only from structures interpreted as siphuncles. Later Williamsoceras, Cacheoceras, and Perkinsoceras (Flower 1968, 1976) were added.

Similar Allotrioceras and Mirabiloceras, known only from the Chazyan (upper lower Middle Ordovician) of New York, are tubular organisms with complex interiors somewhat resembling that of the Endocerida. The later added Williamsoceras, Cacheoceras, and Perkinsoceras are true endocerids as indicated by their cylindroid shells, phragmocones, and siphuncles. Williamsoceras and Cacheoceras are from the Whiterockian stage (lower lower Middle Ordovian) of Utah. Perkinsoceras, which appeared somewhat later, is from the Chazyan of New York, like Allotrioceras and Mirabilioceras but rather distinct from either.

The Allotrioceratidae of Rousseau Flower (Flower 1955) is defined on the basis a structure within the siphuncle, assumed or real, known as an infula that consists of a thin dark, arcuate or curved, line with dark spots interpreted as endosiphuncular tubules. Allotrioceras and Mirabilioceras also have internal subdividing structures that somewhat resemble the longitudinal processes found the siphuncles of some endocerids including Williamsoceras, Cacheoceras, and Perkinsoceras.

The holotypes of Allotrioceras and Mirabiloceras are housed in the collections of the New Mexico Museum of Natural History and Science in Albuquerque, New Mexico.
