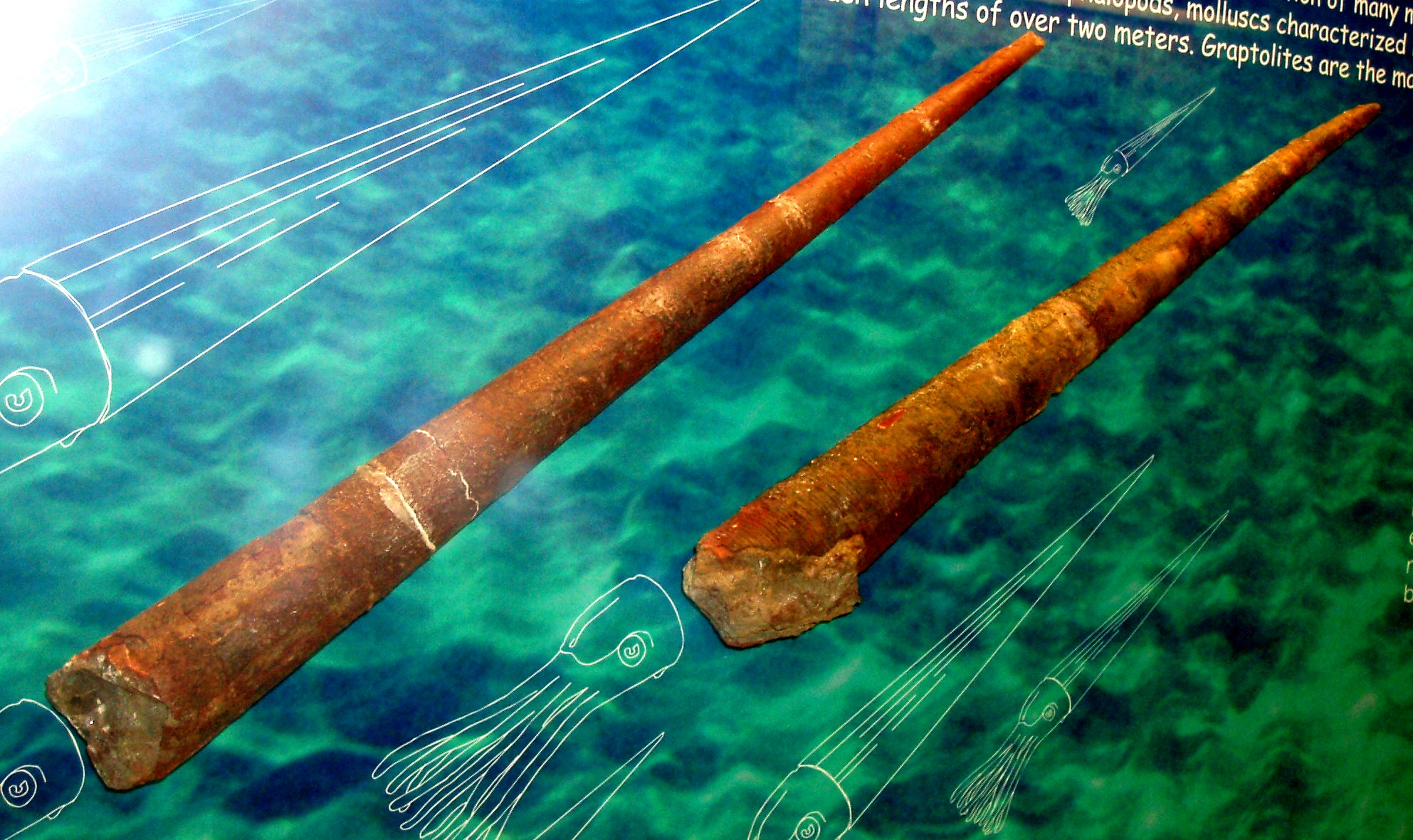
- Fossil of Endoceras in Milan

Scientific classification
- Kingdom: Animalia
- Phylum: Mollusca
- Class: Cephalopoda
- Subclass: Nautiloidea
- Order: †Endocerida
- Family: †Endoceratidae; Hyatt, 1884

= Endoceratidae =

Endoceratidae Temporal range: Middle Ordovician–Late Ordovician

Extinct family of molluscs

Endoceratidae, from Ancient Greek ἔνδον (éndon), meaning "inside", and κέρας (kéras), meaning "horn", is a family of large to very large straight-shelled nautiloid cephalopods belonging to the order Endocerida that lived during the Middle and Late Ordovician. They include the largest known Paleozoic invertebrates, represented by Endoceras and Cameroceras.

== Description ==
Endocerids are characterized by large, generally ventral siphuncles with simple endocones which lack the more complex structures associated with the Proterocameroceratidae and their derivatives. Endocones, nested cone-shaped deposits characteristic of the Endocerida, form in the apical portion of the siphuncle where they balanced the weight of the animal in the body chamber at the opposite end. This helped assure a horizontal orientation while the endoceratid animal was alive. The septal necks are holochoanitic, reaching the previous septum and sometimes beyond, as macrochoanitic. Connecting rings, which may be moderately thin, form a lining on the interior of the necks. In some forms, such as Nanno and Chazyoceras the siphuncle is swollen at the apex so as to preclude the presence of adjacent camerae. In others, such as Cameroceras and Vaginoceras the siphuncle is tubular with chambers formed adjacently from the very start. The taxonomic significance of either in undetermined, other than as used to define a particular genus.

== Origin ==
The Endoceratidae arose from the upper Canadian (Lower Ordovician) Piloceratidae according to Rousseau Flower, which have similar simple structured siphuncles, although they may resemble proterocameroceratids in general form. Accordingly, Flower included the Endoceratdae and Piloceratidae, along with the Cyrtendoceratidae, in a suborder, the Endoceratina.

== Genera ==
Flower restricted the Endoceratidae to those genera from the Middle and Upper Ordovician, and possibly Lower Silurian, belonging to the Endocerida with holochoanitic or macrochoanitic septal necks and simple endocones. Teichert added Proterovaginoceras, Triendoceras. and Allocotoceras from the Lower Ordovician

Genera included are:

- Allocotoceras
- Cameroceras
- Chazyoceras
- Endoceras
- Foerstellites
- Kotoceras
- Kutorgoceras
- Lamottoceras
- Liskeardia
- Nanno
- Suecoceras
- Tasmanoceras
- Triendoceras
- Vaginoceras
- Vaningenoceras
