= Lobendoceras =

Lobendoceras Temporal range: L Ordovician

Scientific classification
- Domain: Eukaryota
- Kingdom: Animalia
- Phylum: Mollusca
- Class: Cephalopoda
- Subclass: Nautiloidea
- Order: †Endocerida
- Family: †Proterocameroceratidae
- Genus: †Lobendoceras; Teichert and Glenister, 1954

Genus of cephalopods

Lobendoceras is a proterocameraceratid with a rather large, moderately expanded, straight shell with a large marginal siphuncle in which sutures have a broad, deep, ventral lobe and septal necks are subholochoanitic to holochoanitic.

Lobendoceras has been found in Lower Ordovician marine strata in NW Australia and Siberia.

== See also ==
- List of nautiloids
