= Williamsoceras =

Williamsoceras Temporal range: lower M Ordovician

Scientific classification
- Kingdom: Animalia
- Phylum: Mollusca
- Class: Cephalopoda
- Family: †Allotrioceratidae
- Genus: †Williamsoceras; Flower, 1968

Genus of nautiloids

Williamsoceras is an endocerid that Rousseau Flower (1968) added to his Allotrioceratidae (Flower 1955) on the basis of having a vertical partition within the siphuncle, known as a ventral process, with inter-connecting tubule-like structures along its margin where intercepted by endocones. Three species are named and described (Flower 1968) from the Garden City limestone of Whiterockian age near Logan and northern Utah, including the genotype Williamsoceras adnatum. Two other species come from the Juab limestone (Flower 1976) of near equivalent age in the southern Confusion Range in the Ibex area in western Utah.

== Description ==
Of the five described species the siphuncle wall and phragmocone are known only from the genotype Williamsoceras adnatum. The other four are known only from pieces of siphuncle which show only internal configurations, but closely resemble that of the genotype.

Williamsoceras is characterized by a ventral process within the siphuncle that extends vertically from the bottom side, essentially bisecting the interior. The process is straight sided and narrow in the more forward part of the siphuncle, approaching the body chamber, and swells to a bulbous or teardrop shape in cross section closer to the apex of the siphuncle where it becomes draped by endocones. As the ventral process and endocones approach a crescent shape space is formed, known as the endosiphocone, the upper side being convex, the lower side concave.

The septal necks, described only from the genotype, are macrochoanitic, extending 1.5 segments back from their origin. and is slightly sinuous in profile (Flower 1968, 1976)

== Comparisons ==
Williamsoceras is similar to Cacheoceras which comes from the same areas and formations, except that Cacheoceras has additional smaller processes, either one on the dorsal side opposite the main process or a pair that are positioned dorsolaterally. It differs from Emmonsoceras (Flower 1955, 1976; Techert 1964) and from Perkinsoceras (Flower 1976) in that the ventral process in these is broad and in broad contact with the lower side of the siphuncle.

Williamsoceras differs from Allotrioceras from the Chazian of Champlain Valley (Flower 1955) in the manner in which the central processes are formed and that the features in Willimasoceras are bilaterally symmetrical while those in Allotrioceras are definitely asymmetric.

== Origin and classification ==
Williamsoceras may have its origin in the Manchuroceratidae from the upper Canadian of northern China and Korea (Flower 1955, 1968, Teichert 1964) derived from the Proterocameroceratidae, by a lengthening of the septal necks.

Williamsoceras is included in the suborder Proterocameroceratina and is closely related to the Emmonsoceratidae
