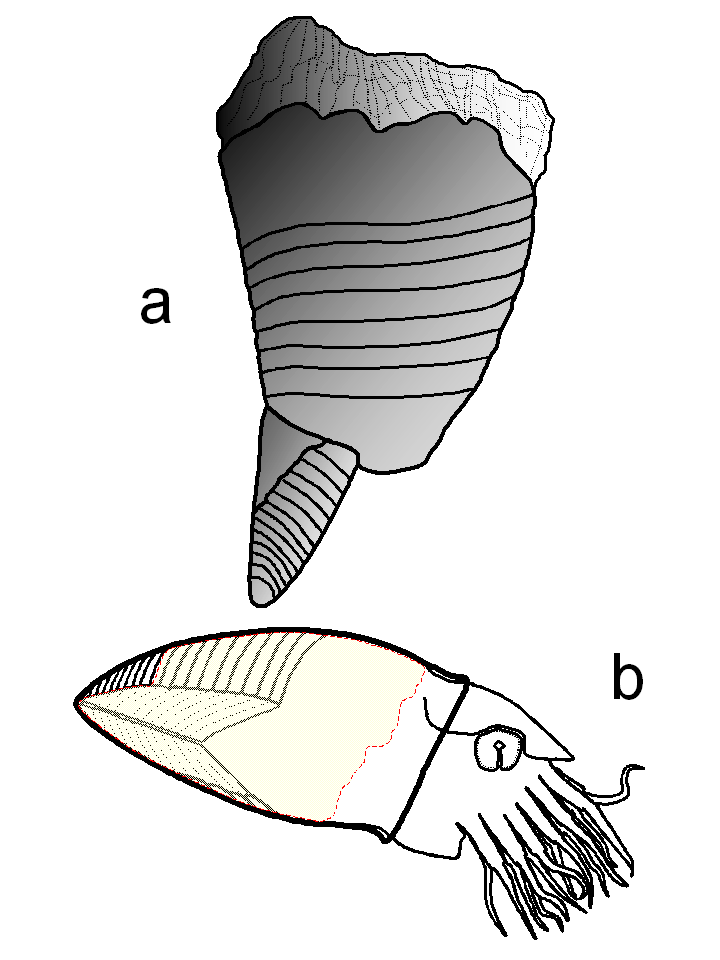

Scientific classification
- Kingdom: Animalia
- Phylum: Mollusca
- Class: Cephalopoda
- Subclass: Nautiloidea
- Order: †Bisonocerida
- Family: †Piloceratidae
- Genus: †Cassinoceras; Ulrich & Foerste, 1936

= Cassinoceras =

Cassinoceras Temporal range: Early Ordovician

Genus of nautiloids

Cassinoceras ("Cassin Horn") is a genus of nautiloids belonging to the endocerid family Piloceratidae that comes from the late Early Ordovician of eastern North America and adjacent territories.

Cassinoceras is characterized by short, laterally compressed, rapidly expanding shells in which the upper, dorsal, surface has a convex curvature and diverges strongly from the essentially straight lower, ventral surface. The siphuncle which entirely fills the apical portion at the back of the shell is also compressed and vertically expanding, and is filled with simple endocones with a complex system of endosiphuncular blades through which a flattened endosiphuncular tube with widely spaced partitions runs. The shell of Cassinoceras grew to about 25 to 30 cm long.

Cassinoceras was named by Ulrich & Foerste in 1936 for the Fort Cassin Limestone of western Vermont, from which the upper stage of the Canadian Epoch, known as the Cassinian gets its name. The genotype is Cassinoceras explanator (Whitfield). A second species Cassinoceras grande Ulrich & Foerste is also known from the Fort Cassin Limestone. The genus has also been found in Newfoundland, the Arctic islands, and on Spitsbergen.
