= Proterocameroceras =

Proterocameroceras Temporal range: uL Ordovician

Scientific classification
- Domain: Eukaryota
- Kingdom: Animalia
- Phylum: Mollusca
- Class: Cephalopoda
- Subclass: Nautiloidea
- Order: †Endocerida
- Family: †Proterocameroceratidae
- Genus: †Proterocameroceras; Reudemann, 1905

Genus of nautiloids

Proterocameroceras is an early Endocerid from the upper Lower Ordovician belong to the Proterocameroceratidae, characterized by a rather large, straight, longiconic shell, short chambers, generally straight sutures, and large ventral siphuncle with short septal necks, thick complex connecting rings, and endocones with three endosiphuncular blades toward the apex.

Proterocameroceas has been found in N America, Greenland, Siberia, and Australia
