= Allotrioceras =

Allotrioceras Temporal range: Middle Ordovician

Scientific classification
- Kingdom: Animalia
- Phylum: ?Mollusca
- Class: ?Cephalopoda
- Order: ?Endocerida
- Family: Allotrioceratidae
- Genus: Allotrioceras Flower, 1955

Genus of molluscs

Allotrioceras is a tubular fossil from the Middle Ordovician of the state of New York, collected by Rousseau H. Flower; included by him in the Endocerida and placed in a new family, the Allotrioceratidae. Allotrioceras is characterized by a lateral pair of subequal conical structures, resembling the endocones of endocerids, separated by a straight partition that extends more than half way across from either the dorsal or ventral side, as perceived, and runs along the length. What remains is thought to represent a siphuncle, which ranges from about 8 millimeters (0.3 in) to about 15 millimeters (0.6 in) in diameter. On the basis of diagnosis, inclusion of Allotrioceras and the Allotrioceratidae, for which it is the type, in the endocerida seems at best tentative.

Some endocerids, derived from the Proterocameroceratidae, Najaceras, Cacheoceras, and Williamsoceras, have a longitudinal dorsal or ventral process, or both about which the endocones are formed, which the partitian of Allotrioceras somewhat resembles. In the Chihliocreratidae, also derived from the Proterocameroceratidae, the main endocones are flanked by two smaller endocones, one on each side, superficially resembling Allotrioceras.

The holotype of Allotrioceras, Allotrioceras bifercatum Flower 1955, rests in the collection of the New Mexico Museum of Natural History and Science in Albuquerque, New Mexico.
