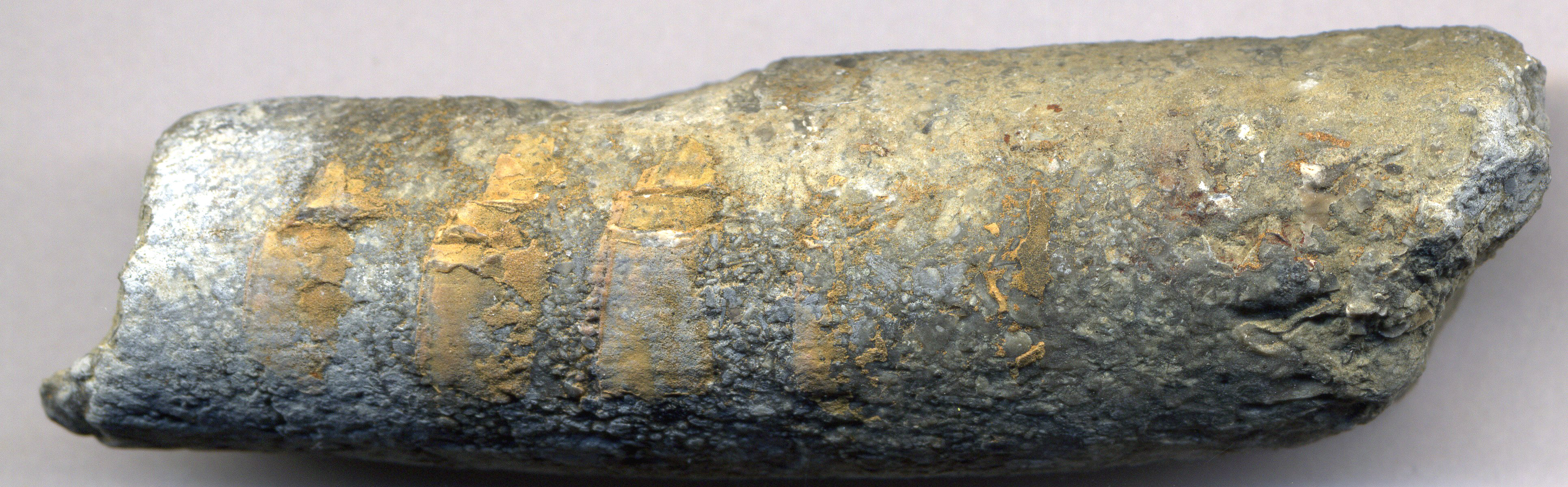
- Partial internal mold of C. inaequabile, Upper Ordovician of northern Kentucky

Scientific classification
- Kingdom: Animalia
- Phylum: Mollusca
- Class: Cephalopoda
- Subclass: Nautiloidea
- Order: †Endocerida
- Family: †Endoceratidae
- Genus: †Cameroceras; Conrad, 1842

Type species
- †Cameroceras trentonense Conrad, 1842

Species
- See text.

= Cameroceras =

Cameroceras Temporal range: Ordovician

Genus of extinct, giant cephalopods

Cameroceras, from Ancient Greek καμάρα (kamára), meaning "chamber", and κέρας (kéras), meaning "horn", is an extinct genus of endocerid cephalopod which lived in equatorial oceans during the entire Ordovician period. Like other endocerids, it was an orthocone, meaning that its shell was fairly straight and pointed. It was particularly abundant and widespread in the Late Ordovician, inhabiting the shallow tropical seas in and around Laurentia, Baltica and Siberia (equivalent to modern North America, Europe, and Asia).

== Description ==
=== Size ===
Cameroceras exhibited a broad range of sizes, and some species were fairly large by extinct cephalopod standards. One species, C. turrisoides from the Boda Limestone of Sweden, is estimated to have shell around 2 metres (6.6 ft) in length, while that of C. rowenaense was about 70 centimetres (2.3 ft).

Some books and older scientific papers treated Cameroceras as the absolute largest nautiloid-grade cephalopod, with a shell length reaching 5.7 metres (19 ft) or even 9.14 metres (30.0 ft). A few more recent studies label the largest orthocone fossils as Endoceras giganteum. Moreover, the maximum length estimate is based on a highly doubtful field observation. Cameroceras and Endoceras are indistinguishable in most anatomical aspects, only differing in their shell texture.

=== Shell structure ===
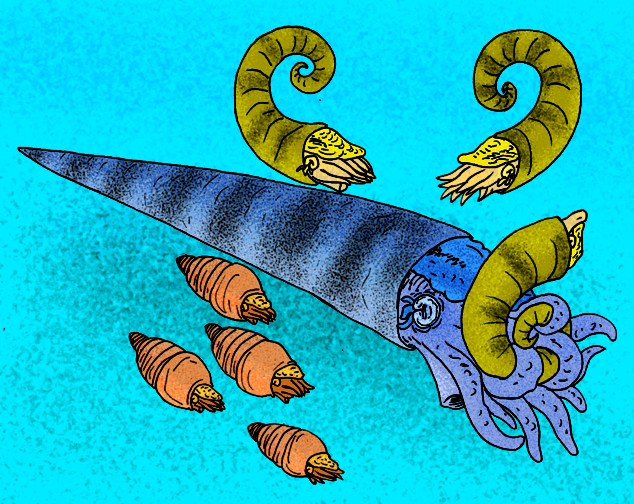
Cameroceras shown feeding on an Aphetoceras, while a quartet of Cyclostomiceras swim by.

Cameroceras is a cephalopod, the same group of mollusks that includes the octopuses, squids, and cuttlefish. The only portion of the animal to fossilize is the shell (formally known as the conch). Like other orthoconic nautiloids, Cameroceras had a narrow conical shell with smooth, simple sutures dividing a series of septa (internal chambers). In cross-section, the shell may be perfectly circular or slightly depressed (elliptical, wider than tall).

The position of the siphuncle varies, but in most species it runs close to the lower edge of the shell. In some species, the siphuncle is voluminous, reaching a diameter equal to half of the shell diameter. The siphuncle is filled with stacked funnel-shaped concretions known as endocones, which have a simple conical form in Cameroceras. A thin endosiphuncular tube passes through the apex of each endocone, in the lower part of the siphuncle. The surface of the siphuncle is supported by septal necks, which are holochoanitic, meaning that they fully sheath the siphuncle and extend all the way between each septum. The main difference between Cameroceras and Endoceras is that Cameroceras lacks annulations (thin concentric rings) on the outer surface of the shell.

From comparison with living cephalopods, particularly the shelled nautilus, some inferences about the biology of Cameroceras can be made. The head of the animal would have been soft, muscular tissue situated at the opening of the shell, with the mantle (sheath-like body wall) lying within the shell for protection. Tentacles would have grown from the base of the head, and these tentacles would have been used to seize and manipulate prey. At the base of these tentacles within the buccal mass (analogous to the mouth), a hard keratinous beak would have bitten into the bodies of its prey, and is assumed to have been strong enough to breach the prey's exoskeleton or shell. Modern cephalopods' beaks contain a radula, or 'toothed' tongue, which is used to rasp out soft tissue from within the prey's shell.

== Classification ==
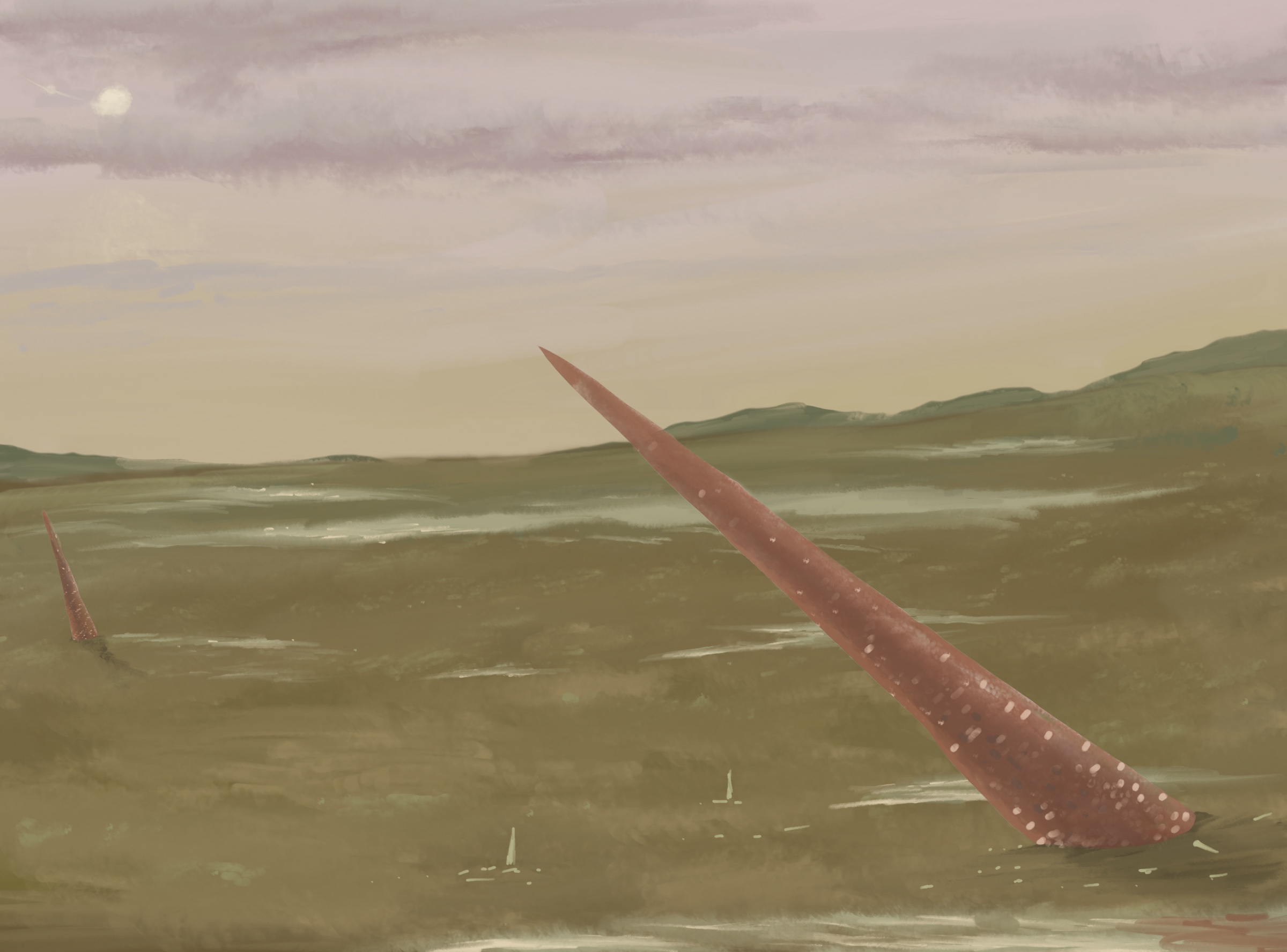
Two beached Cameroceras shells during the Late Ordovician mass extinction.

Cameroceras has historically been utilized as a "wastebasket taxon" in which species of large orthoconic endocerids such as Endoceras, Vaginoceras, and Meniscoceras were originally placed. This poses difficulty for describing Cameroceras as a distinct genus. The type species Cameroceras trentonense was named by Conrad in 1842, based on fossils from the Trenton Limestone of western New York state. The original specimen of C. trentonense is apparently lost, which complicates comparisons to other endocerids.

Hall, who named and described Endoceras annulatum in 1847, recognized C. trentonense as a valid combination, but used Endoceras for other specimens of large endocerids from the Trenton Limestone. Sardeson (1925/1930) suggested that Cameroceras and Endoceras are potentially different growth stages of the same genus, though other authors have doubted this perspective.

For many historical studies, Cameroceras was considered to take precedence over Endoceras whenever the two refer to the same species, according to the principle of priority. Cameroceras' vague early descriptions have led other authors to prefer Endoceras or other better-described genera when the nomenclature is in question. Recent studies generally accept both Cameroceras and Endoceras as valid genera, even some species are in an unstable state between the two.

=== Species ===
Fossils assigned to Cameroceras have been found in North America, Asia, and Europe throughout the Ordovician, though most species occur in the Katian stage of the Late Ordovician. Reports of Cameroceras fossils from the Wenlock epoch of the Silurian are based on Rossicoceras hudsonicum, an endocerid species from Ontario which is sometimes placed within Cameroceras. Species which are currently referred to Cameroceras rather than to other endocerids include:

Species	Author(s)	Year	Temporal range	Notes & description
Cameroceras akpatokense	(Foerste & Cox)	1936	Upper Ordovician (late Katian)	From Akpatok Island in Nunavut. Originally known as Endoceras akpatokense.
Cameroceras alternatum	Flower	1968	Upper Ordovician ("Mohawkian")	A very large species (diameter ~ 16.5 cm) based on a single fossil from the Black River Group of Quebec.
Cameroceras coxi	(Foerste & Cox)	1936	Upper Ordovician (late Katian)	From Akpatok Island in Nunavut. Originally known as Endoceras coxi.
Cameroceras curvatum	Ruedemann	1906	Lower Ordovician	From Vermont.
Cameroceras hasta	(Eichwald)	1857	Upper Ordovician (late Katian)	A widespread European species. Previously known as Endoceras hasta, Endoceras megastoma, or Rossicoceras pirguense.
Cameroceras hennepini	Clarke	1897	Upper Ordovician ("Shermanian")	A large species (diameter ~ 10 cm, length ~ 4 ft) from the Galena Limestone of Minnesota.
Cameroceras huzzohense	Ulrich & Foerste	1930	Lower Ordovician	A common small species (diameter ~ 2.7 cm) from the Gasconade Formation of Missouri.
Cameroceras inaequabile	(Miller)	1882	Upper Ordovician ("Richmondian")	A fairly uncommon but widespread American species found throughout "Richmondian" strata in Ohio, Kentucky, Indiana, and Illinois. Originally known as Endoceras inaequabile.
Cameroceras inopinatum	Stauffer	1937	Lower Ordovician	A tiny species (diameter ~ 1 cm) from the Shakopee Dolomite of Minnesota.
Cameroceras motsognir	Kröger & Aubrechtová	2019	Upper Ordovician (late Sandian – Katian?)	A small species (diameter ~ 4.3 cm) with a slightly curved shell. From the Kullsberg Limestone Formation of Sweden.
Cameroceras regulus	(Eichwald)	1860	Upper Ordovician (late Katian)	A medium-sized European species (diameter ~ 7.2 cm) found in Estonia and Sweden. Originally known as Endoceras regulus.
Cameroceras rowenaense	Frey	1995	Upper Ordovician ("Maysvillian")	A medium-sized species (diameter ~ 8 cm, length > 70 cm) from the Leipers Limestone of Kentucky.
Cameroceras stillwaterense	Stauffer	1937	Lower Ordovician	A small species (diameter ~ 1.5 cm, length > 10 cm) from the Shakopee Dolomite of Minnesota.
Cameroceras styliforme	Grabau	1922	Lower Ordovician	From Hubei, China.
Cameroceras trentonense (type species)	Conrad	1842	Upper Ordovician (late Katian)	The type species, from the Trenton Limestone of New York and possibly the Lexington Limestone of Kentucky.
Cameroceras turrisoides	Kröger	2013	Upper Ordovician (mid-late Katian)	A very large species (maximum diameter ~ 17 cm, total length ~ 2 m) from the Boda Limestone of Sweden and the Bardahessaigh Formation of Ireland.
Cameroceras vertebrale	(Eichwald)	1860	Middle Ordovician	
Cameroceras windriverense	(Miller)	1932	Upper Ordovician (late Katian)	From the Lander Sandstone. Originally known as Endoceras windriverense.

== See also ==
- Cephalopod size
