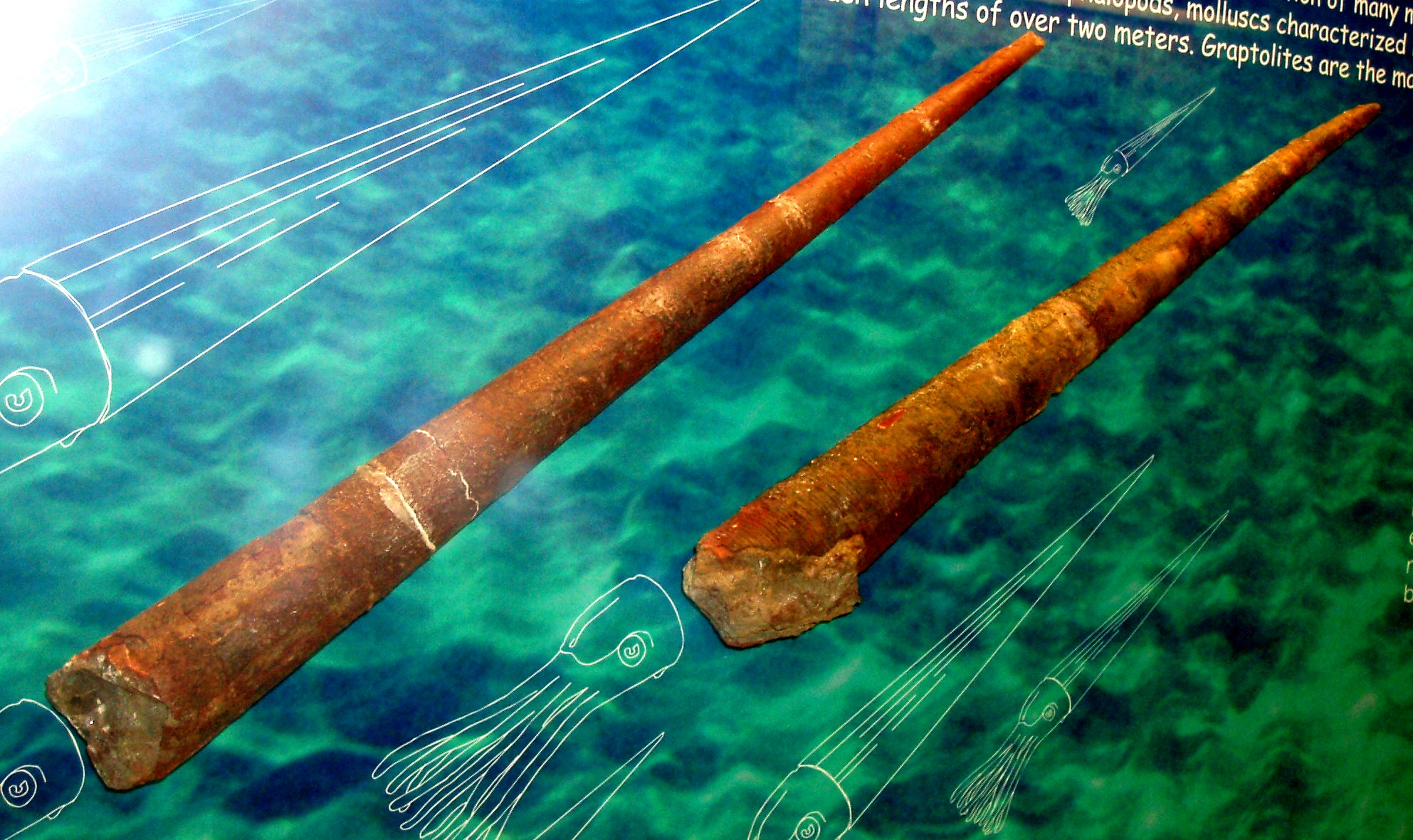
- Specimens in Milan
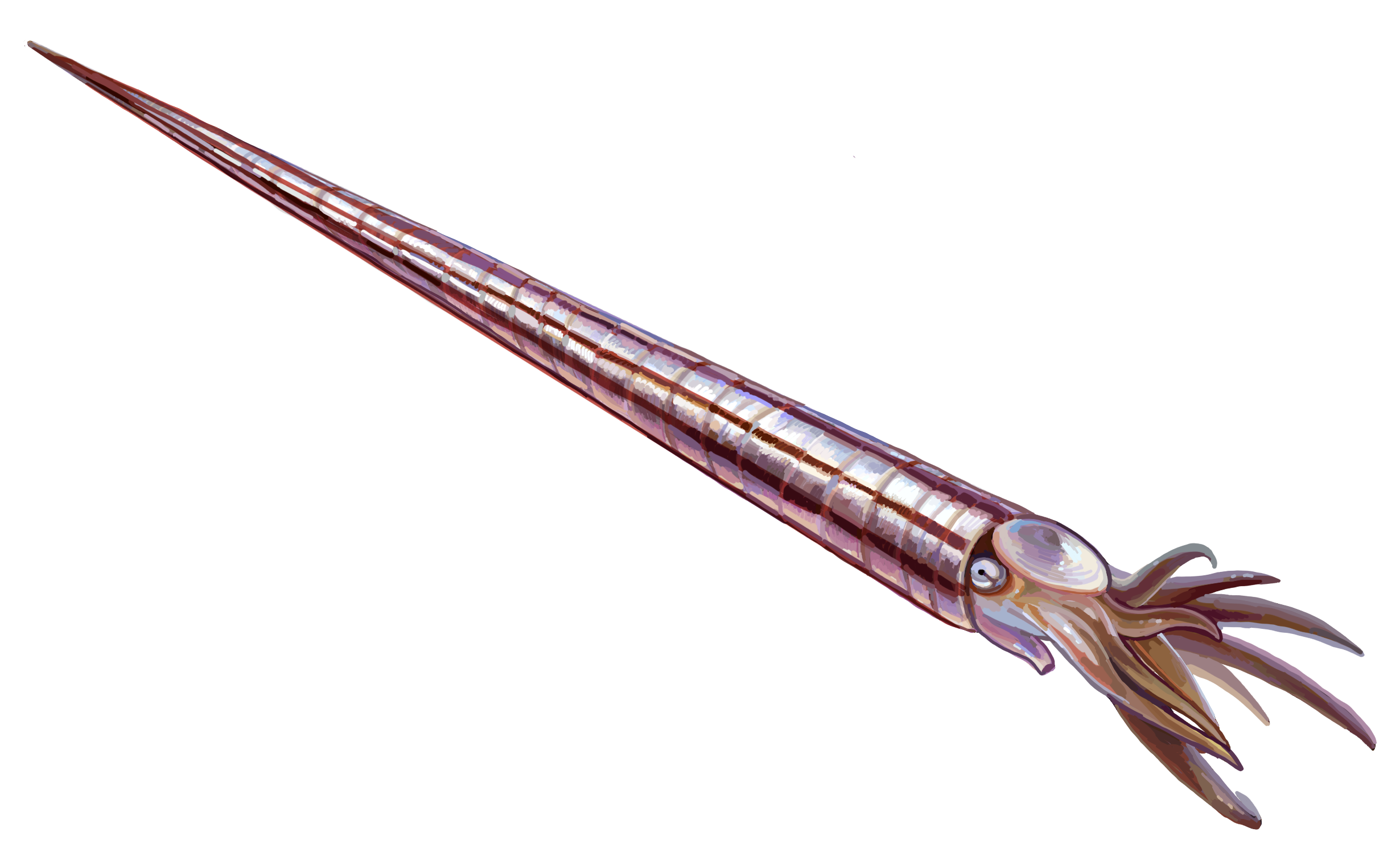
- Life restoration

Scientific classification
- Kingdom: Animalia
- Phylum: Mollusca
- Class: Cephalopoda
- Subclass: Nautiloidea
- Order: †Endocerida
- Family: †Endoceratidae
- Genus: †Endoceras; Hall, 1847

= Endoceras =

Endoceras Temporal range: Ordovician, ~Early Ordovician–Late Ordovician

Extinct genus of molluscs

Endoceras, from Ancient Greek ἔνδον (éndon), meaning "inside", and κέρας (kéras), meaning "horn", is an extinct genus of large, straight-shelled cephalopods that gives its name to the Nautiloid order Endocerida. The genus lived during the Ordovician 477 to 443 million years ago. The cross section in the mature portion is slightly wider than high, but is narrower laterally in the young. Sutures are straight and transverse. Endoceras has a large siphuncle, located close to the ventral margin, composed of concave segments, especially in the young but which may be tubular in the adult stage. Endocones are simple, subcircular in cross section, and penetrated by a narrow tube which may contain diaphragms reminiscent of the Ellesmerocerid ancestor.

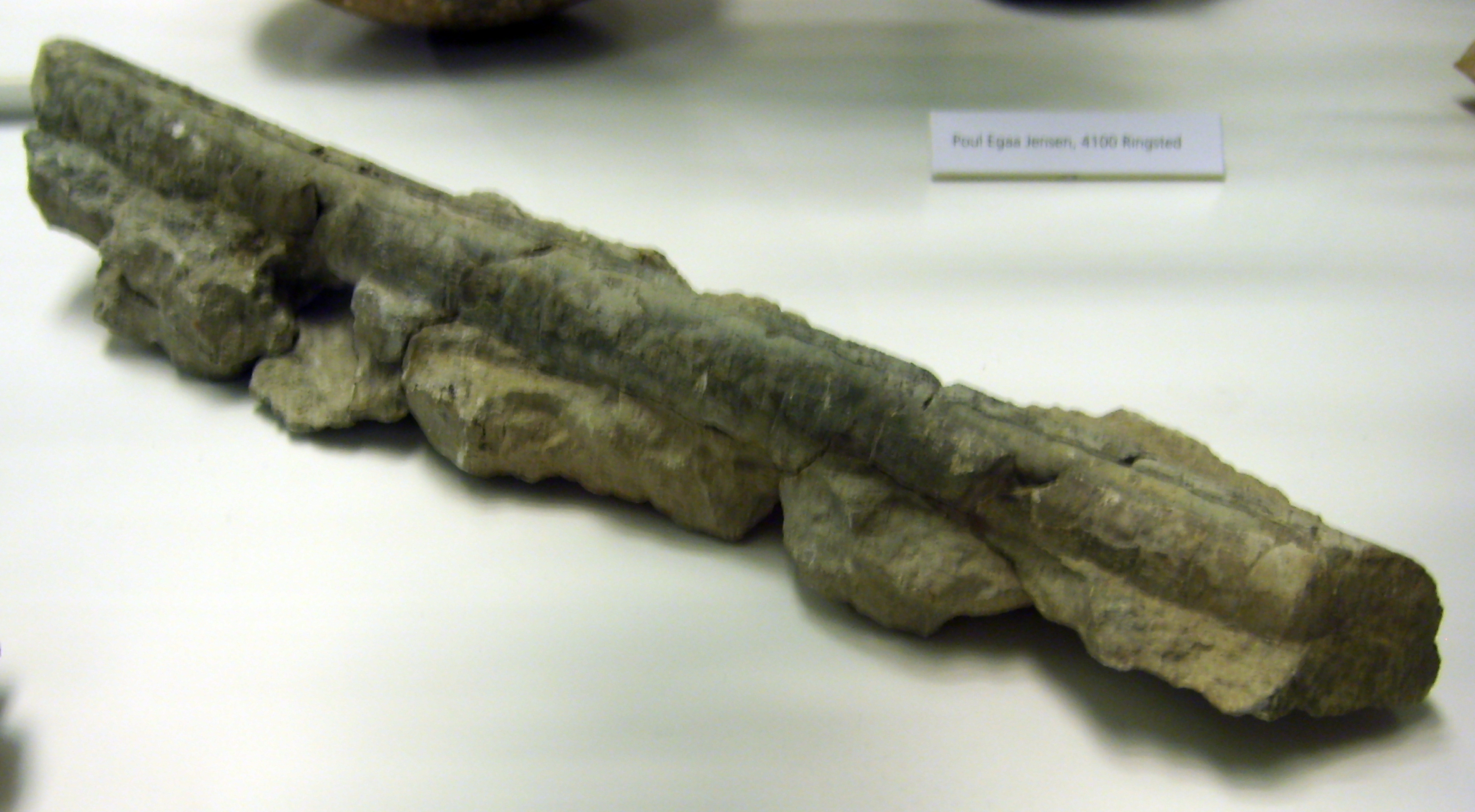
Specimen from Stevns, Denmark

Endoceras was named by Hall in 1847. It is widely distributed, especially in North America and Europe; and fossils have also been found in Australia. Endoceras is similar to Cameroceras, the two may be synonymous, but differs from the genus Nanno in that the siphuncle in Nanno fills the entire apical portion of the shell while in Endoceras the siphuncle is ventral even there with septa formed at the onset.

Mature, full grown, Endoceras were most likely ambush predators that lay in wait on the sea floor, moving when necessary to gain the advantage. Younger individuals with compressed cross sections may have been more actively mobile.

== Size ==
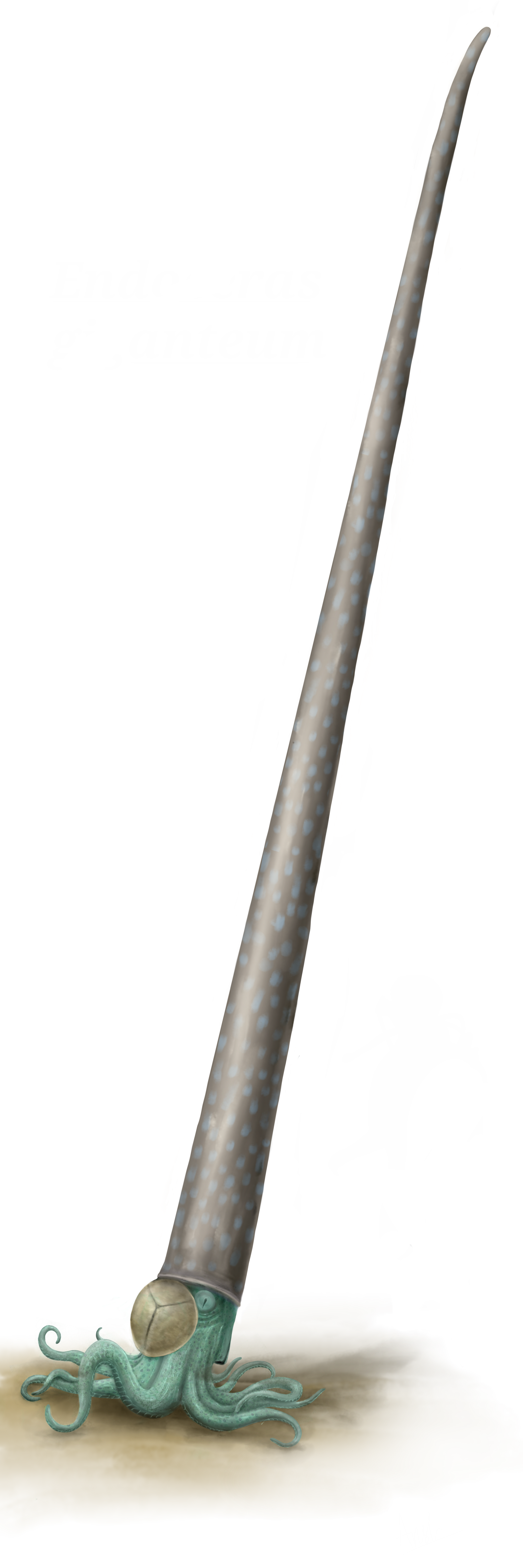
Life restoration of Endoceras giganteum

A specimen of Endoceras giganteum at the Museum of Comparative Zoology measures 3 meters (9.8 feet) as preserved. A 2015 estimate infers a complete shell length at approximately 5.73 meters (18.8 feet). This would make it the largest cephalopod by length in the fossil record. Another large orthocone fossil is displayed at the University of Michigan Museum of Natural History. Flower (1955) mentioned a second-hand report of a 9.1-meter (30-foot) shell that was destroyed in the field without ever being collected or photographed. Later studies view this report with a high degree of skepticism.

Despite its large size, the shell of Endoceras was quite narrow, so the animal in life would have been far more lightweight than other large cephalopods. A 2025 study estimated that the largest othocones weighed around 100 kilograms (220 pounds) . By comparison, the heaviest ammonoid (Parapuzosia seppenradensis) may have reached 400 kilograms (880 pounds) while the living colossal squid reached 495 kilograms (1,091 pounds).
