= Najaceras =

Najaceras Temporal range: Middle Ordovician(Whiterockian)

Scientific classification
- Kingdom: Animalia
- Phylum: Mollusca
- Class: Cephalopoda
- Subclass: Nautiloidea
- Order: †Bisonocerida
- Family: †Najaceratidae
- Genus: †Najaceras; Flower, 1971

Type species
- Najaceras triangulatum Flower, 1971

Other species
- N. bilbatum Flower, 1971; N. chevroniferum Flower, 1971

Extinct genus of nautiloids

Najaceras is a genus of straight, slender endocerid known only from the Whiterockian age Oil Creek Limestone of Oklahoma, introduced and named by Rousseau Flower in 1971 and further described by him in 1976.

Najaceras is characterized by a longitudinal mound of material that runs forward from the apical region along the inside of the top of the siphuncle known as a dorsal process. This process, which is somewhat broad in aspect, is concave ventrally. The opening between the dorsal process and the endocone forms a dorsally concave crescent shape. The process is bisected in the lower port by which is known as a blade which bifurcates upwardly from about the middle.

The genus Najaceras is based on Najaceras triangulatum (Flower, 1971) which comes from the Oil Creek Limestone on West Spring Creek, 3 miles east of Pooleville, Oklahoma. The holotype and paratype are at the U.S. National Museum. Two other species from the same area have been identified and named: N. bilobatum (Flower, 1971), and N. chevroniferum (Flower, 1971).

Najaceras probably gave rise to the similar Meniscoceras which also has a dorsal process. Based on that unique feature the two are placed in their own family, the Najaceratidae. Najaceras comes from "naja", the word for the crescent at the bottom of the Navajo squash blossom or wedding necklace.
