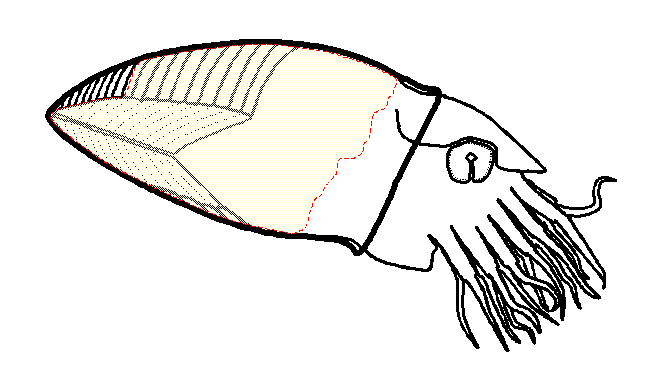
- Cassinoceras, a Floian piloceratid

Scientific classification
- Kingdom: Animalia
- Phylum: Mollusca
- Class: Cephalopoda
- Subclass: Nautiloidea
- Superorder: †Endoceratoidea
- Order: †Bisonocerida; Evans & King, 2012

Families
- Allotrioceratidae; Bisonoceratidae; Chihlioceratidae; Coreanoceratidae; Emmonsoceratidae; Humeoceratidae; Manchuroceratidae; Najaceratidae; Piloceratidae; Proterovaginoceratidae; Sinoendoceratidae

= Bisonocerida =

Bisonocerida Temporal range: Tremadocian–Wenlock

Extinct order of nautiloids

Bisonocerida is an order of Ordovician to Silurian nautiloid cephalopods. Members of this order were originally placed in the order Endocerida, but later investigation argued that this broad usage of Endocerida was a polyphyletic assemblage encompassing two different groups of independent origin. Bisonocerida was differentiated from Endocerida in 2012 in order to resolve this issue.

Bisonocerids are similar to endocerids in many respects. The siphuncle was broad and positioned ventrally in the shell, which ranged in shape from cyrtoconic brevicones (curved and short) to rare orthoconic longicones (straight and long). The inner surface of the siphuncle contains endosiphuncular deposits, which help distinguish the two orders. In both bisonocerids and endocerids, the endosiphuncular deposits are conical in shape ("endocones"), concreted from the rim of the siphuncle and tapering towards the apex of the shell. Both orders possess simple perforate endocones, with a hole at the tip of each cone for siphuncle tissue to pass through. Structures similar to simple endocones are also apparently present in some members of the earlier cephalopod orders Yanhecerida and Ellesmerocerida.

Unlike true endocerids, the simple endocones of bisonocerids are interlaced with a more complex form of endocone. “Complex” endocones are imperforate, without a hole at the tip. In cross-section, they are composed of several bulbous calcareous crests extending into the siphuncle. This only leaves an irregular and discontinuous pinched space, known as an infula, for the remaining siphuncle tissue. The infula may be compressed to the point that it resembles radiating splinters in cross-section, known as endosiphoblades. The calcareous crests were able to form by concreting onto narrow sheets of infolded conchiolin, a condition unique to bisonocerids.

Other distinctive traits of bisonocerids include long septal necks and a siphuncle which is swollen at the apex of the shell. Bisonocerids appear to be oncomyarian, meaning that they have a numerous small, undifferentiated muscle scars ringing around their body chamber. This is unlike endocerids, which have a few large muscle scars at the top of the body chamber, a dorsomyarian condition.

When originally defined as a new order, Bisonocerida was suggested to be an independent descendant of Ellesmerocerida. It was later allied with the broad subclass Multiceratoidea. However, a 2022 phylogenetic analysis argued that Bisonocerida was closely related to Endocerida once more. Under this hypothesis, the two orders were sister taxa within the subclass Endoceratoidea.
