= Piloceratidae =

Piloceratidae Temporal range: Ordovician

Scientific classification
- Kingdom: Animalia
- Phylum: Mollusca
- Class: Cephalopoda
- Subclass: Nautiloidea
- Order: †Bisonocerida
- Family: †Piloceratidae

Genera
- † Allopiloceras; † Bisonoceras; † Cassinoceras; † Dartonoceras; † Piloceras; † Penhsioceras

Extinct family of nautiloids

The Piloceratidae are a compressed, rapidly expanding, cyrtoconic brevicones with holochoanitic ventral siphuncles and simple endocones. Most likely evolved from Clitendoceras, a narrow, slightly endogastric genus intermediate in form between straight shelled Proendoceras and the bulkier Piloceratidae. Found in shallow carbonate marine sediments of Demingian through the Cassinian age, (essentially Arenigian, = early Middle -Upper Canadian) .

Pilocerids split off from the Proterocameroceratidae very shortly after their inception and are the first family which the proterocamerocerids gave rise to. With the exception of Humeoceras, found in the middle Silurian, pilocerid genera are limited to the Lower Ordovician (Canadian in North America).

The general shape of the pilocerid shell precludes an ambush predator lying in wait on the sea floor, or a stealthful hunter drifting through the water. Rather, they probably crawled over the sea floor, head down with the shell off the bottom, searching for prey.

Nothing is known of their soft part anatomy, other than what can be surmised from the fact they are cephalopods. They likely possessed tentacles of some sort, but were they numerous like those of modern Nautilus, limited to eight or ten as with octopus or squid, or of some other arrangement.

Pilocerid genera include the strongly curved Piloceras, Bisonoceras with its hooked bison horn shape, nearly straight Allopiloceras, Dartonoceras, and internally complex Cassinoceras. Ecologically the Piloceratidae were replaced in the Middle Ordovician by the Cyrtendoceradae, which may have evolved early from the Endoceratidae rather than being direct pilocerid descendants.
