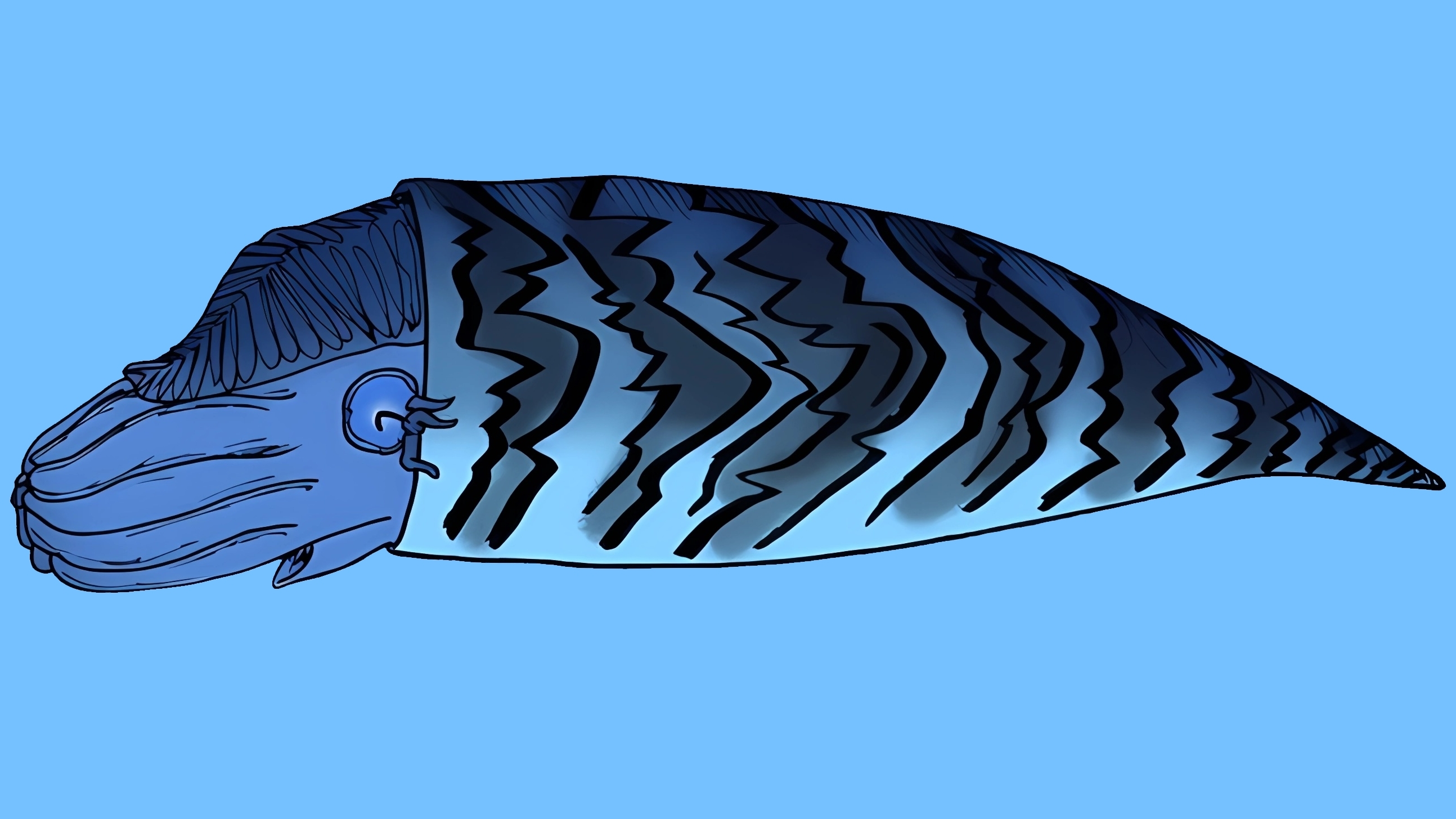
- Restoration of N. aulema

Scientific classification
- Kingdom: Animalia
- Phylum: Mollusca
- Class: Cephalopoda
- Subclass: Nautiloidea
- Order: †Endocerida
- Family: †Endoceratidae
- Genus: †Nanno; Clarke, 1894

= Nanno (cephalopod) =

Nanno Temporal range: M Ordovician

Extinct genus of molluscs

Nanno is an extinct genus of endocerid, named by Clarke in 1894 for the apical end of an endocerid from the Trenton Limestone of New York state that has the basic description of the nanno type (where the siphuncle swells to fill the entire apex of the shell, leaving septa and camerae to begin a few centimeters forward). It is possibly a senior synonym for Proterovaginoceras. As a valid genus, Nanno is included in the Endoceratidae, but the nanno type apex may be found in other families.
