= Proterocameroceratidae =

Proterocameroceratidae Temporal range: Ordovician

Scientific classification
- Kingdom: Animalia
- Phylum: Mollusca
- Class: Cephalopoda
- Subclass: Nautiloidea
- Order: †Endocerida
- Family: †Proterocameroceratidae; Kobayashi, 1937

Extinct family of nautiloids

Proterocameroceratidae is an extinct family of nautiloids. They the first of the Endocerida. They began early in the Ordovician with Proendoceras or similar genus which had developed endocones, replacing the diaphragms of the ellesmerocerid ancestor.

Proterocameroceratids are long, straight or gently curved with a generally narrow siphuncle along the ventral margin. Septal necks are short, never quite reaching the previous septum and may vary in length ontogenically within a species. Connecting rings are thick and layered. Endocones are simple, especially in early forms but may be complex with secondary structures in later forms.

The Proterocameroceratidae gave rise to the Piloceratidae early on, and later to the Manchuroceratidae and Chihlioceratidae, from which the Allotrioceratidae are derived, and later yet possibly to the Emmonsoceratidae and Najaceratidae. The Piloceratidae in turn may have given rise to the Endoceratidae although a proterocameroceratid ancestor remains possible. Proterocameroceratids were probably mobile bottom predators that moved from place to place over the sea floor in search of prey or escape. Their shell was on one hand a carry over from some Cambrian monoplacophoran ancestor, passed on through previous orders, and on the other both a hydrodynamic facilitator and protection. But the shells of nautiloids, such as the proterocameroceratids was also an impediment to true squidlike or fishlike swimming. They could not have had fins for propulsion or steering, only the hyponome for spontaneous jet mobility and their tentacles by which to crawl across the sea floor and to grasp at things. The diagnostic endocones in the early part of the siphuncle balanced the weight of the animal living at the front of the shell.

The Proterocameroceratidae ultimately suffered the extinction at the end of the Ordovician, but not before having given rise to a variety of endocerid families. They remain a subject of interesting research.

== Genera ==
The following genera, all extinct, are assigned to this family:

- Anthoceras
- Clitendoceras
- Cotteroceras
- Eocameroceras
- Kirkoceras
- Lobendoceras
- Manitouoceras
- Mcqueenoceras
- Oderoceras
- Paraendoceras
- Proendoceras
- Proterocameroceras
- Protocyptendoceras
