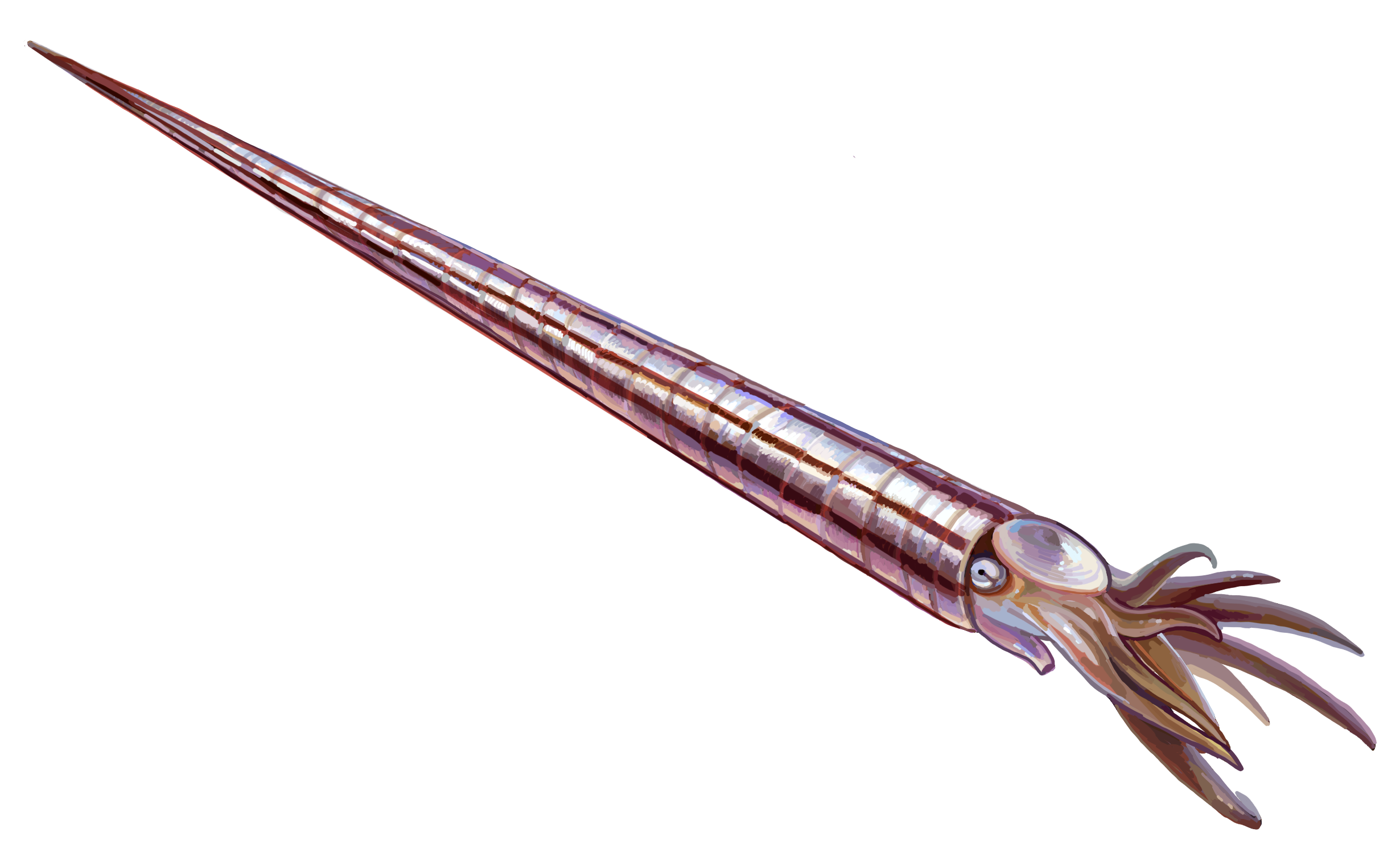
- Endoceras

Scientific classification
- Kingdom: Animalia
- Phylum: Mollusca
- Class: Cephalopoda
- Subclass: Nautiloidea
- Superorder: †Endoceratoidea
- Order: †Endocerida; Teichert, 1933

Families
- † Cyrtendoceratidae † Endoceratidae † Proterocameroceratidae † Yorkoceratidae

= Endocerida =

Endocerida Temporal range: Floian–Hirnantian

Fossil order of cephalopods

Endocerida, from Ancient Greek ἔνδον (éndon), meaning "inside", and κέρας (kéras), meaning "horn", is an extinct nautiloid order, a group of cephalopods from the Lower Paleozoic with cone-like deposits in their siphuncle. Endocerida was a diverse group of cephalopods that lived from the Early Ordovician possibly to the Late Silurian. Their shells were variable in form. Some were straight (orthoconic), others curved (cyrtoconic); some were long (longiconic), others short (breviconic). Some long-shelled forms like Endoceras attained shell lengths close to 6 metres (20 ft). The related Cameroceras is anecdotally reported to have reached lengths approaching 9 metres (30 ft), but these claims are problematic. The overwhelming majority of endocerids and nautiloids in general are much smaller, usually less than a meter long when fully grown.

== Morphology ==
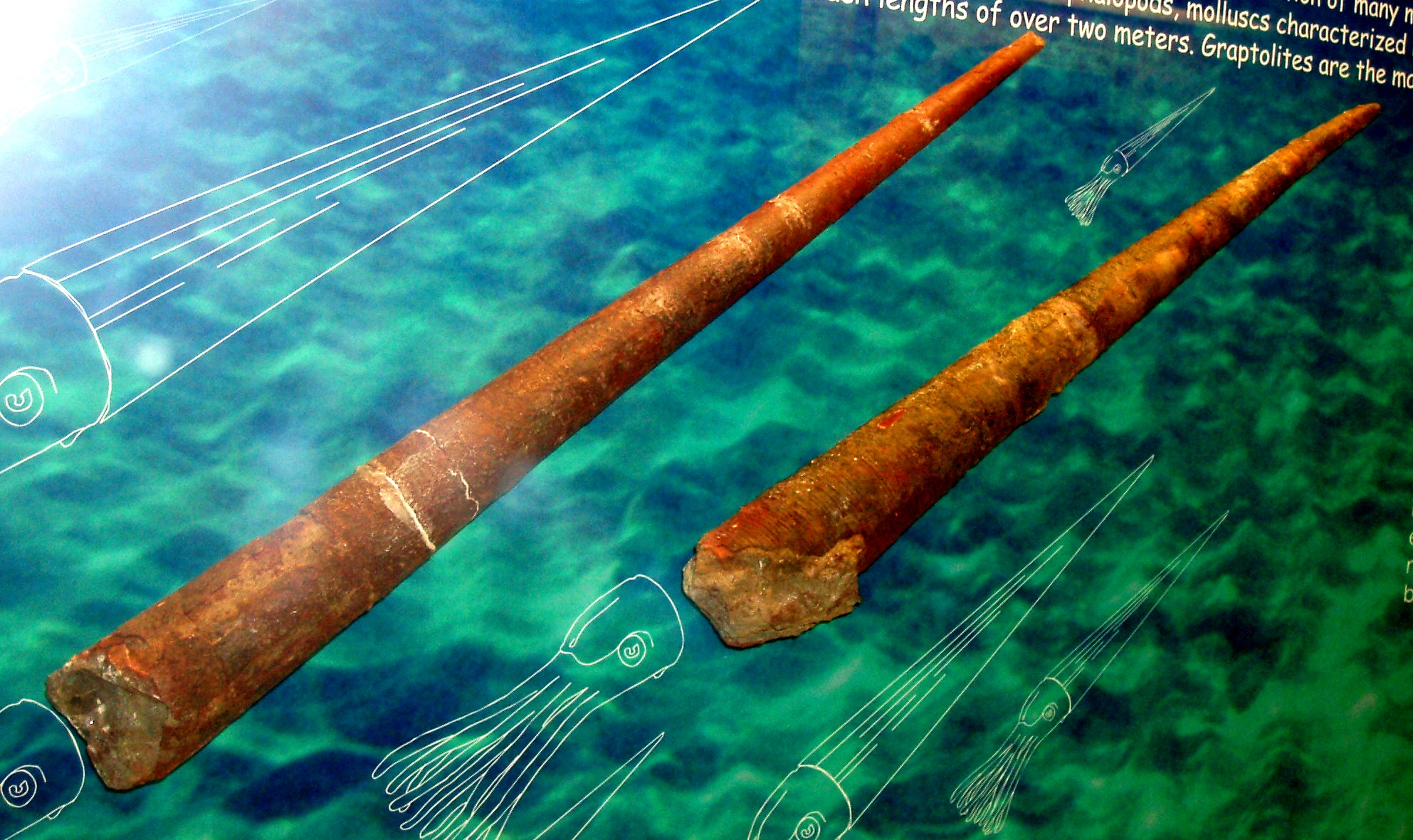
Endoceras fossils

Endocerids had a relatively small body chamber as well as a proportionally large siphuncle, which in some genera reached nearly half the shell diameter. This suggests that much of the visceral mass may have been housed within the siphuncle itself rather than just in the body chamber as with other nautiloids (Teichert, 1964). Endocerids are primarily distinguished by the presence of conical calcareous deposits, known as endocones, found in the more apical portion of the siphuncle. They are thought to act as a counterweight for the animal's body. The chambers (camerae) of endocerids are always free of organic deposits, unlike orthoceratoid cephalopod orders such as the Orthocerida and Actinocerida.

=== Body size ===
Endocerids reached enormous body sizes. The largest confirmed specimen, belonging to Endoceras giganteum, is 3 metres (9.8 ft) long as preserved, but is missing a substantial portion of its aboral end. The reconstructed length of the shell is nearly 6 metres (20 ft). An alleged endocerid specimen 30 feet (9.1 m) long is unconfirmed.

== Ecology ==
The mode of life of endocerids is debated. Endocerids may have been the apex predators of the Ordovician, probably living close to the sea floor, and preying on trilobites, molluscs, brachiopods and other bottom-dwelling organisms. They were probably not active nektonic swimmers, but rather crawled over the floor of epicontinental seas or lay there in ambush. Although there is study that supports filter feeding ecology, according to hydrostatic properties, it is not likely and still supports benthic predators.

=== Reproduction ===
Endocerids laid relatively large eggs, and hatched at a relatively large body size. It is likely that endocerids were demersal after hatching, as large eggs would make an easy target for predators in the pelagic zone. Endocerids may have migrated from their habitat in the open ocean to shallower water to lay their eggs.

== Diversity ==
Endocerids were among some half a dozen cephalopod orders that appeared in the Lower Ordovician. They reached their greatest diversity during the Lower to Mid-Ordovician, but were already in decline by the middle of this period with most genera becoming extinct by the end of the Sandbian (late Ordovician), while some rare hangers on lasted into the Silurian. In any case, the endocerid lineage became completely extinct relatively early on in cephalopod history.

== Classification ==
=== Evolution ===
Endocerids evolved from the earlier ellesmerocerids, most likely from a genus similar to Pachendoceras. This ellesmerocerid gave rise to Proendoceras, the earliest representative of the Proterocameroceratidae and hence of the Endocerida. Endocerids evolved from ellesmerocerids by reduction of siphuncle diaphragms and the development of endocones. In the early part of the mid-Lower Ordovician, the Endocerida quickly diversified into many different families. In true endocerids, there was a trend of overall increasing size, eventually resulting in massive orthoconic genera such as Endoceras and Cameroceras. In another lineage (now known as Bisonocerida), the siphuncle grew more complex, resulting in genera such as Chihlioceras and Allotrioceras.

=== Taxonomy ===
Citing its diversity, Curt Teichert (1964) placed the Endocerida in its own subclass called the Endoceroidea or Endoceratoidea (which some Russian paleontologists ranked as a superorder instead. Rousseau Flower rejected this separation on the grounds that endocerids were no more diverse or complex than any other order. He considered them to be simply another order within the Nautiloidea.

Flower (1958) divided the Endocerida into two suborders, the Proterocamerocerina and the Endocerina. As he defined the two suborders, Proterocamerocerina included the Proterocameroceratidae, Manchuroceratidae, and Emmonsoceratidae, while Endocerina included the Piloceratidae and Endoceratidae. Endocerid classification since then has relied on a dichotomy between short-shelled forms with complex endocones and long-shelled forms with simple endocones.

Endocerid relationships have been difficult to establish both within the order and relative to other nautiloids. Their generally orthoconic shell shape and dorsomyarian muscle scars are similar to the subclass Orthoceratoidea, which are ancestral to ammonoids (ammonites) and coleoids (squid, octopus, etc.). However, their nautilosiphonate connecting ring structure and lack of cameral deposits are more similar to living nautilus and their proposed ancestors, the subclass Multiceratoidea. Some studies have re-established Endoceratoidea to clarify that endocerids occupy a unique subclass of nautiloids.

Restudy of piloceratid-like families with complex endocones has suggested that Endocerida in its broadest form is polyphyletic, with piloceratid-like and proterocameroceratid-like members having independent origins from ellesmerocerids. In light of this issue, the numerous piloceratid-like families were placed within a new order, Bisonocerida. Bisonocerida may still be related to endocerids within Endoceratoidea.

== See also ==
- Cephalopod size
