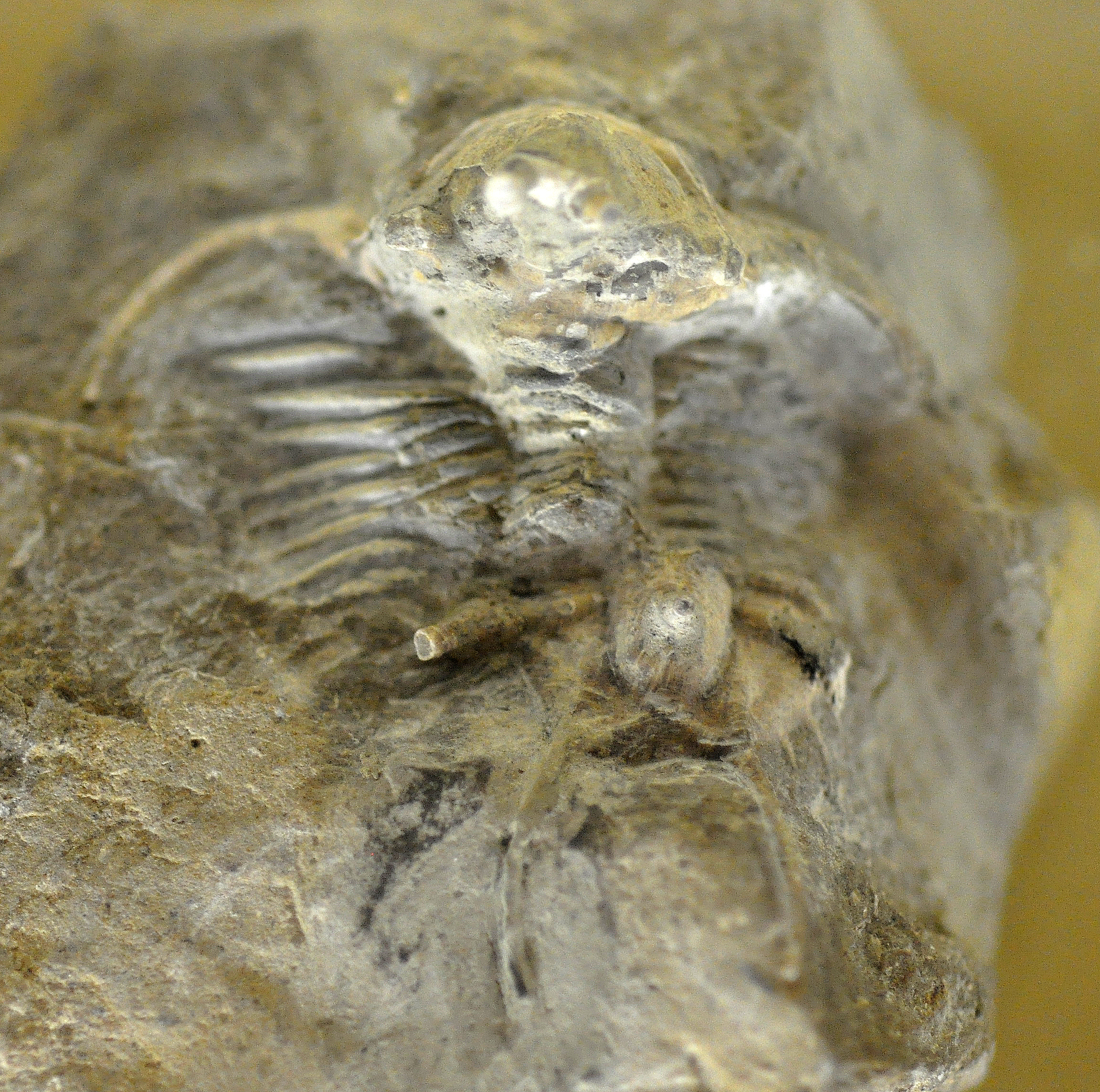
- Ceratarges armatus from Middle Devonian limestone of Gerolstein

Scientific classification
- Kingdom: Animalia
- Phylum: Arthropoda
- Clade: †Artiopoda
- Class: †Trilobita
- Order: †Lichida
- Family: †Lichidae
- Genus: †Ceratarges
- Species: †C. armatus

Binomial name
- †Ceratarges armatus Goldfuss, 1839

= Ceratarges armatus =

Ceratarges armatus Temporal range: Middle Devonian–Late Devonian

Extinct species of trilobite

Ceratarges armatus is the type species of the trilobite genus Ceratarges in the family Lichidae.
