= Apatolichas =

Apatolichas Temporal range: Late Arenig

Scientific classification
- Kingdom: Animalia
- Phylum: Arthropoda
- Clade: †Artiopoda
- Class: †Trilobita
- Order: †Lichida
- Family: †Lichidae
- Genus: †Apatolichas; Whittington, 1963

Extinct genus of trilobites

Apatolichas is an extinct genus from a well-known class of fossil marine arthropods, the trilobites. It lived during the later part of the Arenig stage of the Ordovician Period, approximately 478 to 471 million years ago.
