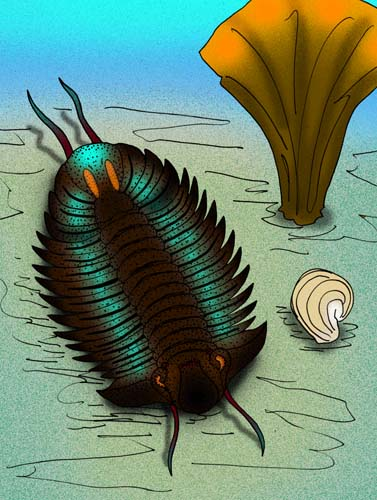
- Reconstruction of Lichas laciniatus

Scientific classification
- Kingdom: Animalia
- Phylum: Arthropoda
- Clade: †Artiopoda
- Class: †Trilobita
- Order: †Lichida
- Family: †Lichidae
- Genus: †Lichas; Dalman, 1827

= Lichas (trilobite) =

Lichas Temporal range: Ordovician-Devonian, 468.1–391.9 Ma

Trilobites from Ordovician-Devonian age

Lichas is a genus of lichid trilobites from Ordovician-Devonian-aged marine strata of Europe and Morocco.
