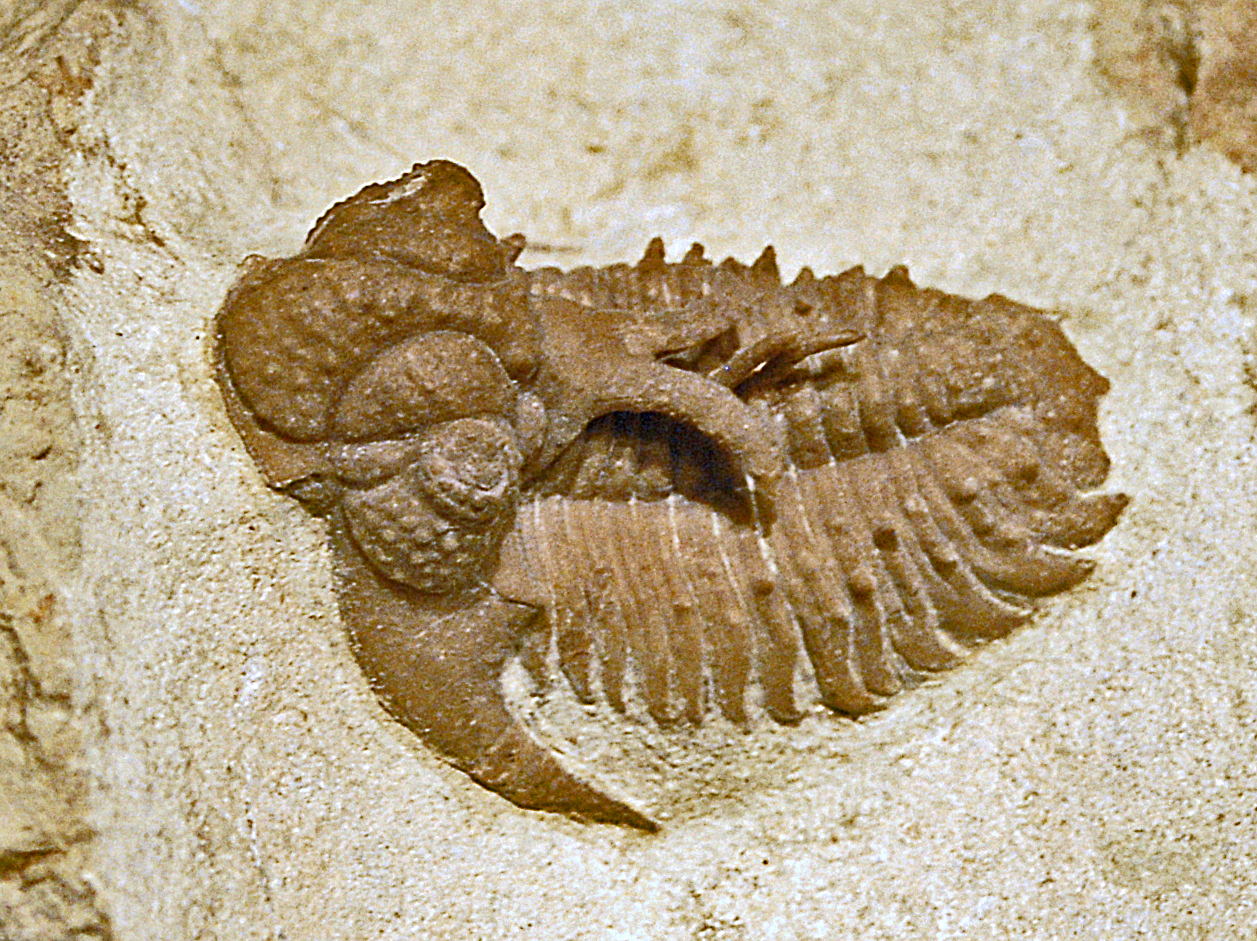
- Hoplolichoides conicotuberculatus. Middle Ordovician from Russia

Scientific classification
- Kingdom: Animalia
- Phylum: Arthropoda
- Clade: †Artiopoda
- Class: †Trilobita
- Order: †Lichida
- Family: †Lichidae
- Genus: †Hoplolichoides; Phleger, 1936

Species
- Hoplolichoides conicotuberculatus (Nieszkowskia 1859); Hoplolichoides curvifrons (Warburg 1939); Hoplolichoides furcifer (Schmidt 1885)

= Hoplolichoides =

Hoplolichoides Temporal range: Middle Ordovician

Genus of lichid trilobite

Hoplolichoides is a genus of lichid trilobites belonging to the family Lichidae. These fast-moving low-level epifaunal carnivores lived in the Middle Ordovician (abt. 470 Ma) of Russia.
