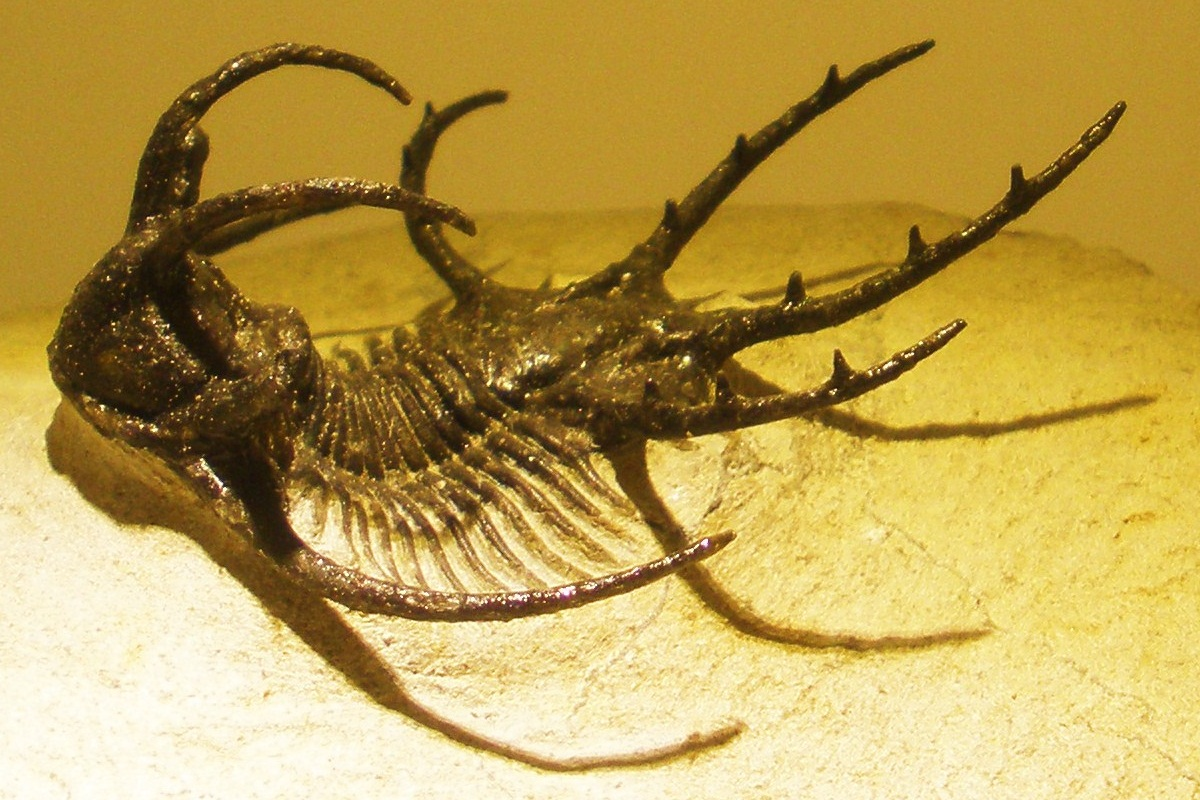
- Ceratarges sp.

Scientific classification
- Kingdom: Animalia
- Phylum: Arthropoda
- Clade: †Artiopoda
- Class: †Trilobita
- Order: †Lichida
- Family: †Lichidae
- Genus: †Ceratarges; Gürich, 1901

Species
- †Ceratarges armatus (type); †Ceratarges berolinensis; †Ceratarges faouensis; †Ceratarges bergicus; †Ceratarges cognatus; †Ceratarges ziregensis; †Ceratarges koumalii; †Ceratarges aries

= Ceratarges =

Ceratarges Temporal range: 393–388 Ma

Genus of lichid Trilobite

Ceratarges is a genus of lichid Trilobite from the Middle to late Devonian. It lived in what is now western Europe and Morocco. It averaged around 10 cm (4 inches) in length and 9 cm (3.5 inches) in width.
