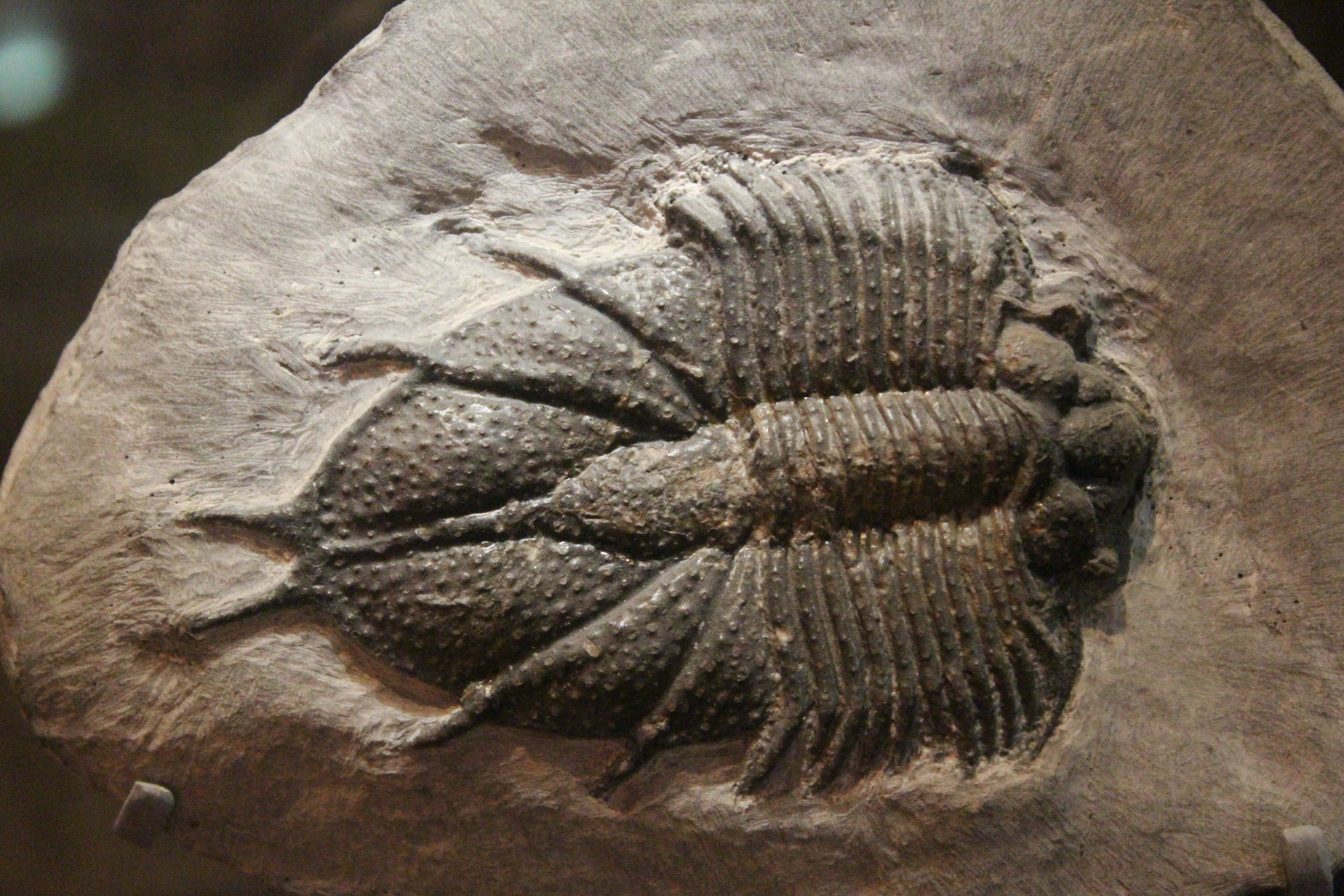
- Acanthopyge sp., Devonian, Morocco

Scientific classification
- Kingdom: Animalia
- Phylum: Arthropoda
- Clade: †Artiopoda
- Class: †Trilobita
- Order: †Lichida
- Family: †Lichidae
- Genus: †Acanthopyge; Hawle & Corda, 1847

Species
- A. haueri (Barrande, 1846) (type) synonyms Lichas haueri, A. leuchtenbergii; A. consanguinea (Clarke, 1894) synonym Arges consanguineus

Synonyms
- Euarges, Mephiarges, Diplolichas, Lobopyge

= Acanthopyge =

Acanthopyge Temporal range: Middle Silurian to Middle Devonian

Extinct genus of trilobites

Acanthopyge is an extinct genus of lichid trilobite that lived during the Devonian. Very few A. consanguinea from the Devonian of Oklahoma have been found, and only a handful of complete specimens from Morocco, and many so-called Acanthopyge-specimens from Morocco are fake.

== Sources ==
- Photos of A. consanguinea
- Trilobite info (Sam Gon III)
