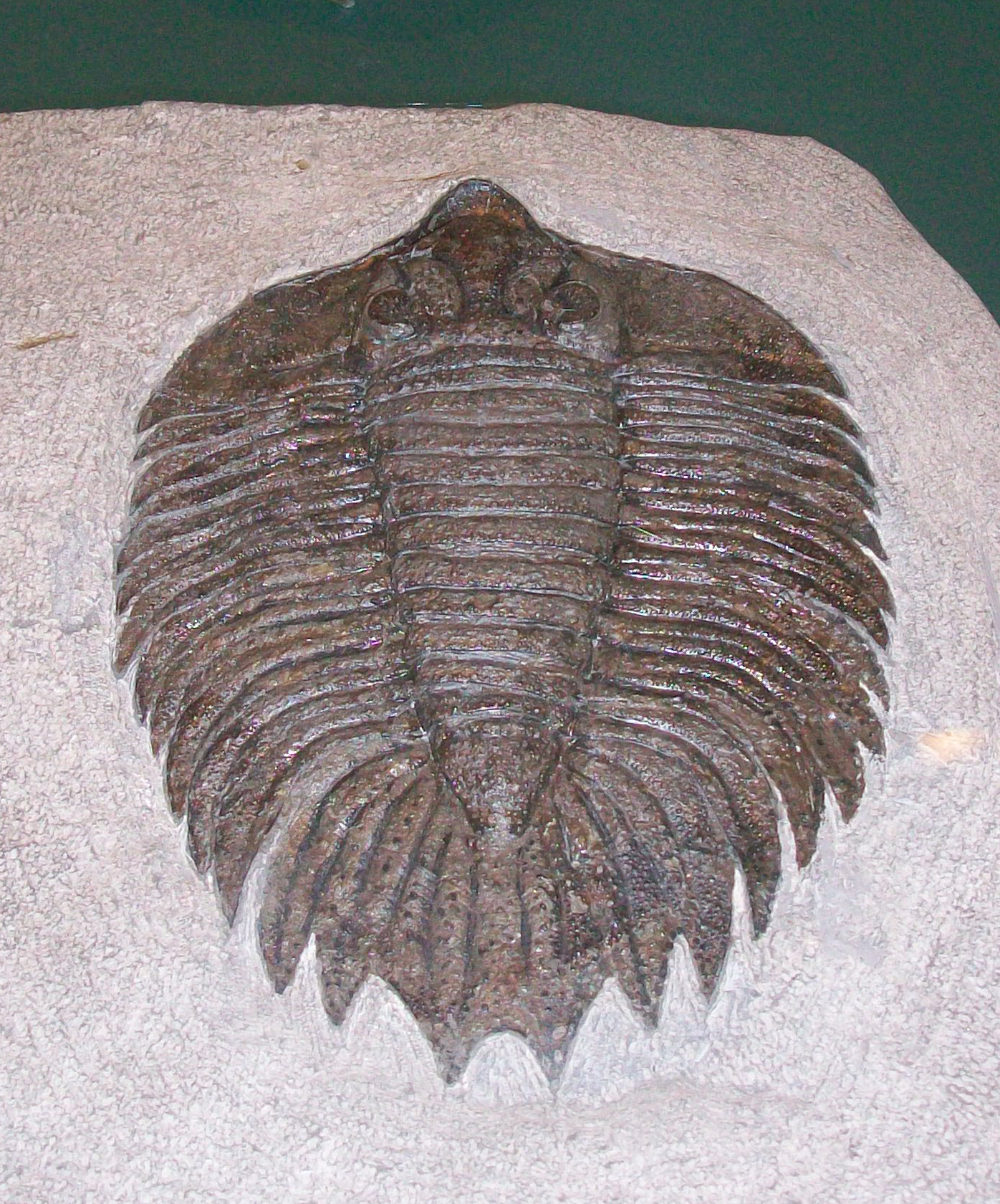
- Fossil of Arctinurus boltoni in the Field Museum of Natural History.

Scientific classification
- Kingdom: Animalia
- Phylum: Arthropoda
- Clade: †Artiopoda
- Class: †Trilobita
- Order: †Lichida
- Family: †Lichidae
- Genus: †Arctinurus; Castelnau, 1843
- Species: †A. boltoni

Binomial name
- †Arctinurus boltoni (Bigsby, 1825)

= Arctinurus =

Arctinurus Temporal range: Wenlock–Ludlow

Species of trilobite (fossil)

Arctinurus boltoni is a large (up to 30 cm) lichid trilobite of the mid-Silurian. This trilobite reached about eight inches in length, though the normal adult carapace was about four inches. It lived in moderately deep-water in semi-tropical regions. Arctinurus fossils have been found in Europe and North America.

Arctinurus was first reported during the construction of the Erie Canal through soft Silurian shales and mudstones in upstate New York. Before the late 1990s, complete Arctinurus fossils were very rare. The vast majority of complete specimens were commercially mined near Middleport New York, USA, in a shallow quarry in the Rochester Formation, and the trilobite is now relatively common in museum, university and private collections. Arctinurus tended to have epibionts attached to the carapace.
