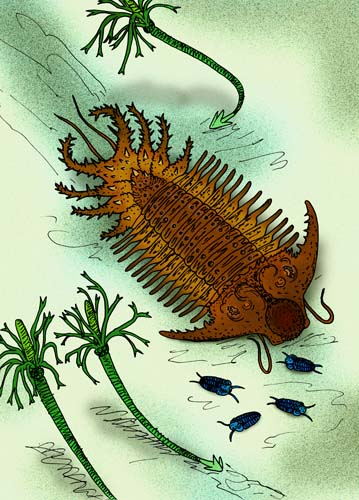

Scientific classification
- Kingdom: Animalia
- Phylum: Arthropoda
- Clade: †Artiopoda
- Class: †Trilobita
- Order: †Lichida
- Family: †Lichidae
- Genus: †Terataspis; Hall, 1863
- Species: †T. grandis

Binomial name
- †Terataspis grandis (Hall, 1861)

= Terataspis =

Terataspis Temporal range: Late Emsian

Lichid trilobite genus

Terataspis is a comparatively huge, 60 centimetre long lichid trilobite genus from the Early Devonian, about 397 million years ago. It is the third largest trilobite specimen ever recorded, with first and second going to Isotelus rex and Uralichas hispanicus respectively. The genus only contains one species, T. grandis. It lived in a shallow sea in what is now New York State and Ontario. No whole specimens have been found, only disarticulated fragments of its exoskeleton, but enough fragments have been found to allow researchers to form reconstructions of the whole animal. The first fragments were found in the Schoharie grit of eastern New York State and were documented by John Mason Clarke.

== Diet ==
Terataspis grandis, like many other trilobites, was presumed to have been a detritivore that was also an opportunistic predator, preying on small burrowing animals, such as molluscs, worms, or arthropods.

Terataspis grandis

== Description ==
Almost the entire body of T.grandis is covered with spines and tubercles of varying sizes; these features served as a defense mechanism, deterring predators with an exterior similar to spiked armor. The pygidium is large and shield-like with four pairs of slightly curved barbed spines on the sides. The thorax consists of around 11 segments. The cephalon is characterized by its swollen front portion and longitudinal furrows that delineates a pair of swellings that located in line with the eyes. The hypostome is almost flat and kidney-shaped and has a poorly defined central body.
