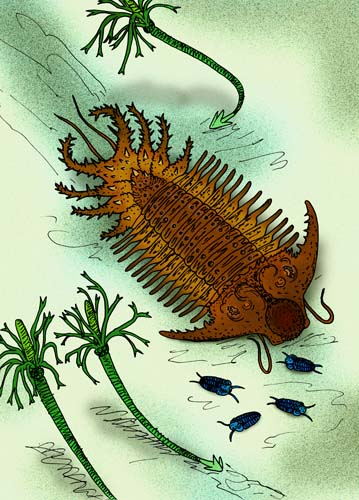
- Terataspis grandis

Scientific classification
- Kingdom: Animalia
- Phylum: Arthropoda
- Clade: †Artiopoda
- Class: †Trilobita
- Order: †Lichida; Moore, 1959

Families
- Lichidae; Lichakephalidae

= Lichida =

Lichida Temporal range: Furongian–Frasnian

Extinct order of trilobites

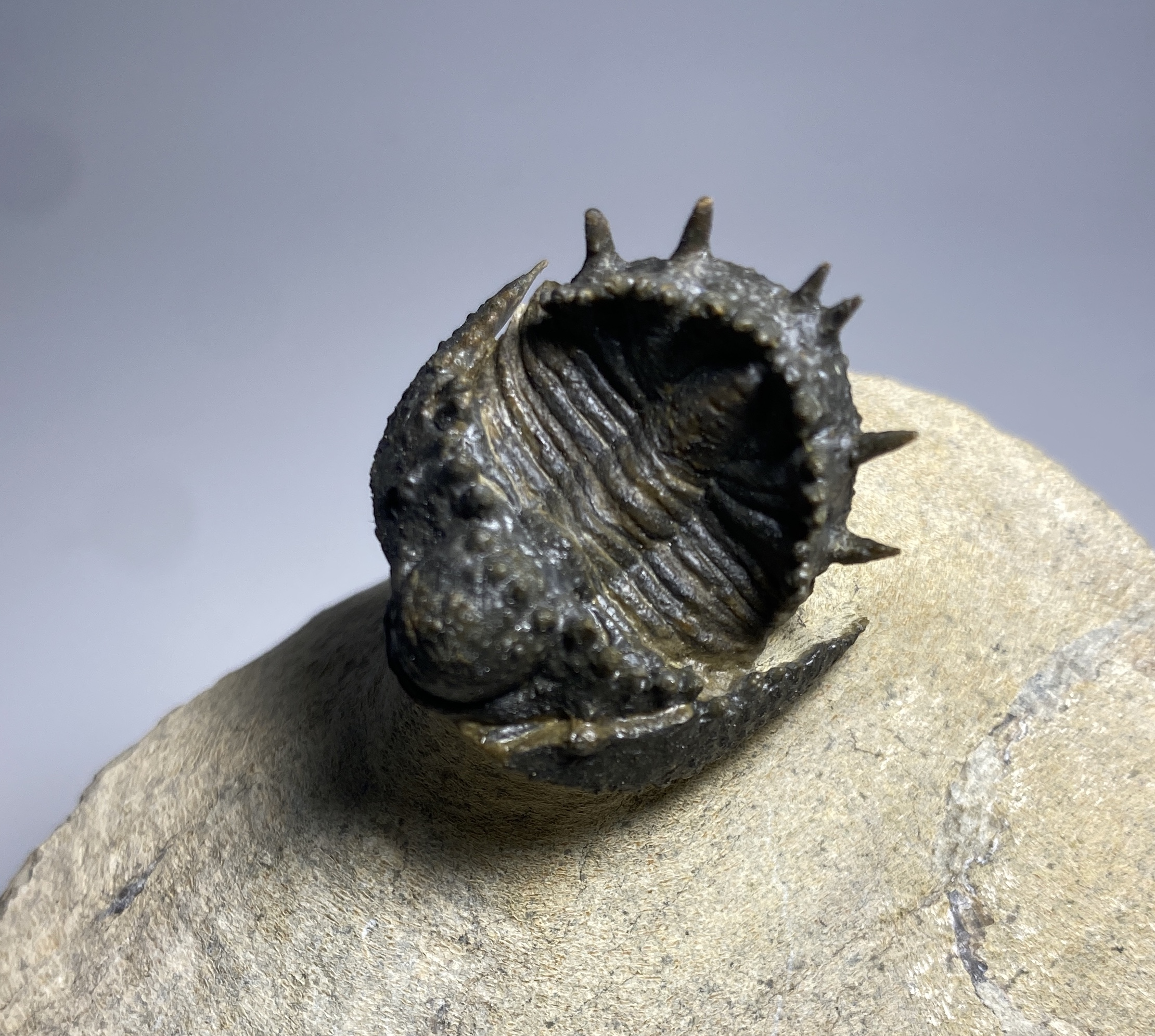
Akantharges

Lichida is an order of typically spiny trilobite that lived from the Furongian to the Devonian period. These trilobites usually have 8–13 thoracic segments. Their exoskeletons often have a grainy texture or have wart or spine-like tubercles. Some species are extraordinarily spiny, having spiny thoracic segments that are as long or longer than the entire body, from cephalon (head) to pygidium (tail). The sections of the pygidia are leaf-like in shape and also typically end in spines.

The order is divided into two families, Lichidae, and Lichakephalidae. Some experts group the families of the closely related order Odontopleurida within Lichida, too, whereupon the family is then divided into three superfamilies, Dameselloidea, containing the family Damesellidae, Lichoidea, containing the families Lichidae and Lichakephalidae, and Odontopleuroidea, containing the family Odontopleuridae.

Lichids are some of the largest trilobites, with the second and third largest trilobites (Uralichas hispanicus, and Teratapsis grandis) being in the order.

== Taxa traditionally placed within Lichida ==
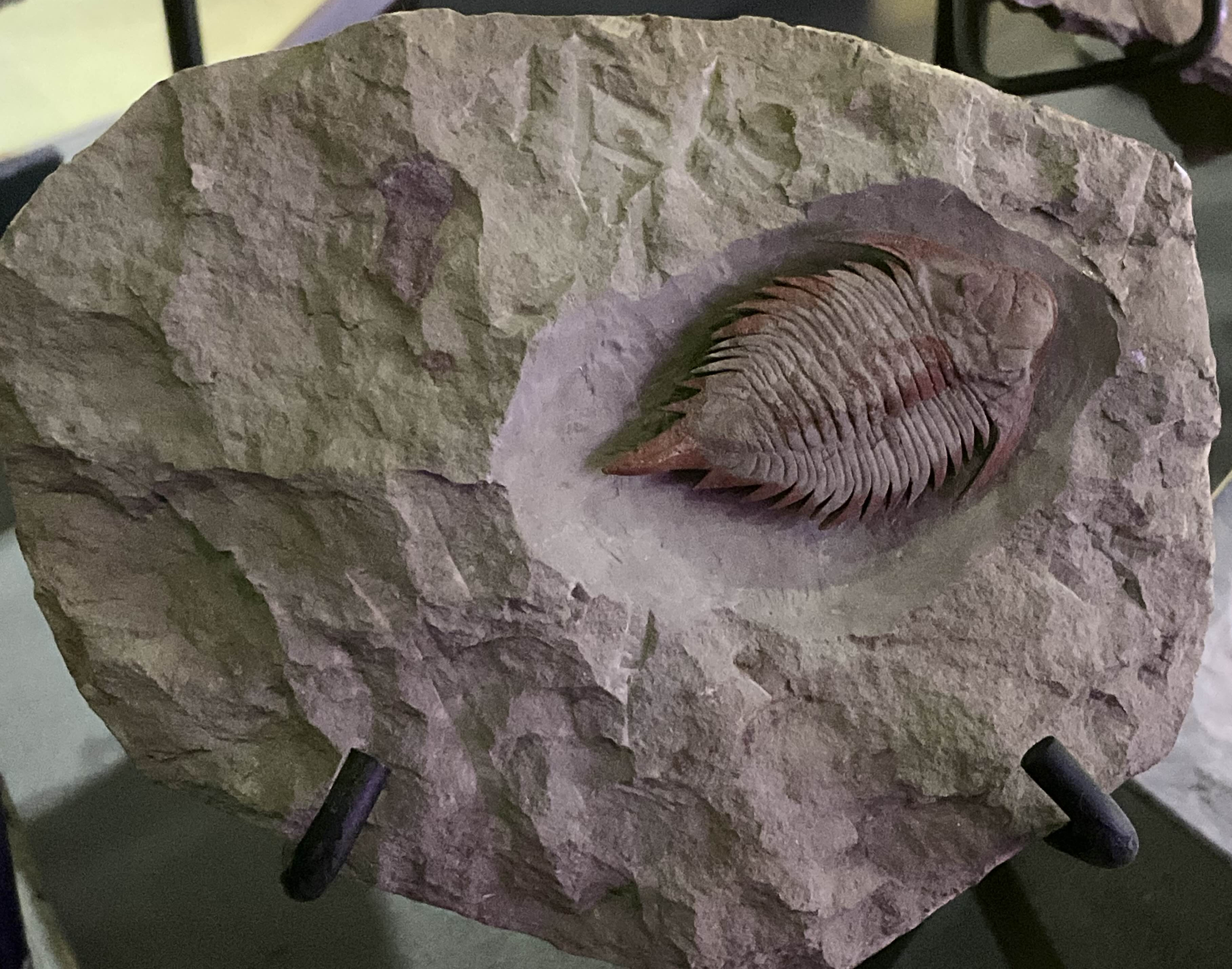
Parvilichas marochii

As mentioned earlier, the order Lichida is divided into two families.

=== Lichidae ===
- Acanthopyge
- Akantharges
- Allolichas
- Amphilichas
- Apatolichas
- Arctinurus
- Autoloxolichas
- Borealarges
- Ceratarges
- Conolichas
- Craspedarges
- Dicranogmus
- Dicranopeltis
- Echinolichas
- Eifliarges
- Gaspelichas
- Hemiarges
- Homolichas
- Hoplolichas
- Hoplolichoides
- Jasperia
- Leiolichas
- Lichas
- Lobopyge
- Lyralichas
- Mephiarges
- Metaleiolichas
- Metalichas
- Metopolichas
- Neolichas
- Nipponarges
- Ohleum
- Oinochoe
- Otarozoum
- Paraleiolichas
- Perunaspis
- Platylichas
- Probolichas
- Pseudotupolichas
- Radiolichas
- Richterarges
- Rontrippia
- Terataspis
- Terranovia
- Trimerolichas
- Trochurus
- Uralichas
- Uripes

=== Lichakephalidae ===
- Acidaspidella
- Acidaspides
- Acidaspidina
- Archikainella
- Belovia
- Bestjubella
- Brutonia
- Colossaspis
- Eoacidaspis
- Lichakephalus
- Lichakephalina
- Metaacidaspis
- Paraacidaspis
- Usoviana

=== Cladogram ===
Pollit et al. (2005) described the internal relationships below family level for Lichida.

- Lichidae
  - Lichinae
    - - - - Echinolichini
            - Echinolichas
            - Terataspis
            - Conolichas
            - Otarozoum
          - Tetralichini
            - Apatolichas
            - Lyralichas
            - Amphilichas
            - Pseudotupolichas
        - Platylichini
          - Platylichas
          - Autoloxolichas
          - Allolichas
          - Arctinurus
      - Lichini
        - Lichas
    - Dicranopeltini
      - Dicranopeltis
      - Uralichas
      - Dicranogmus
      - Oinochoe
      - Metopolichas
  - Trochurinae
    - Acanthopyge
    - Trochurus
    - Ceratarges
    - Radiolichas
    - Borealarges
    - Richterarges
    - Hemiarges
    - Akantharges
    - Uripes
    - Hoplolichas
    - Hoplolichoides
- Lichakephalidae
  - Lichakephalus
  - Lichakephalina
  - Eoacidaspis
  - Acidaspidina
  - Acidaspidella
